= Kumayri historic district =

Kumayri
- Old city (Gyumri)
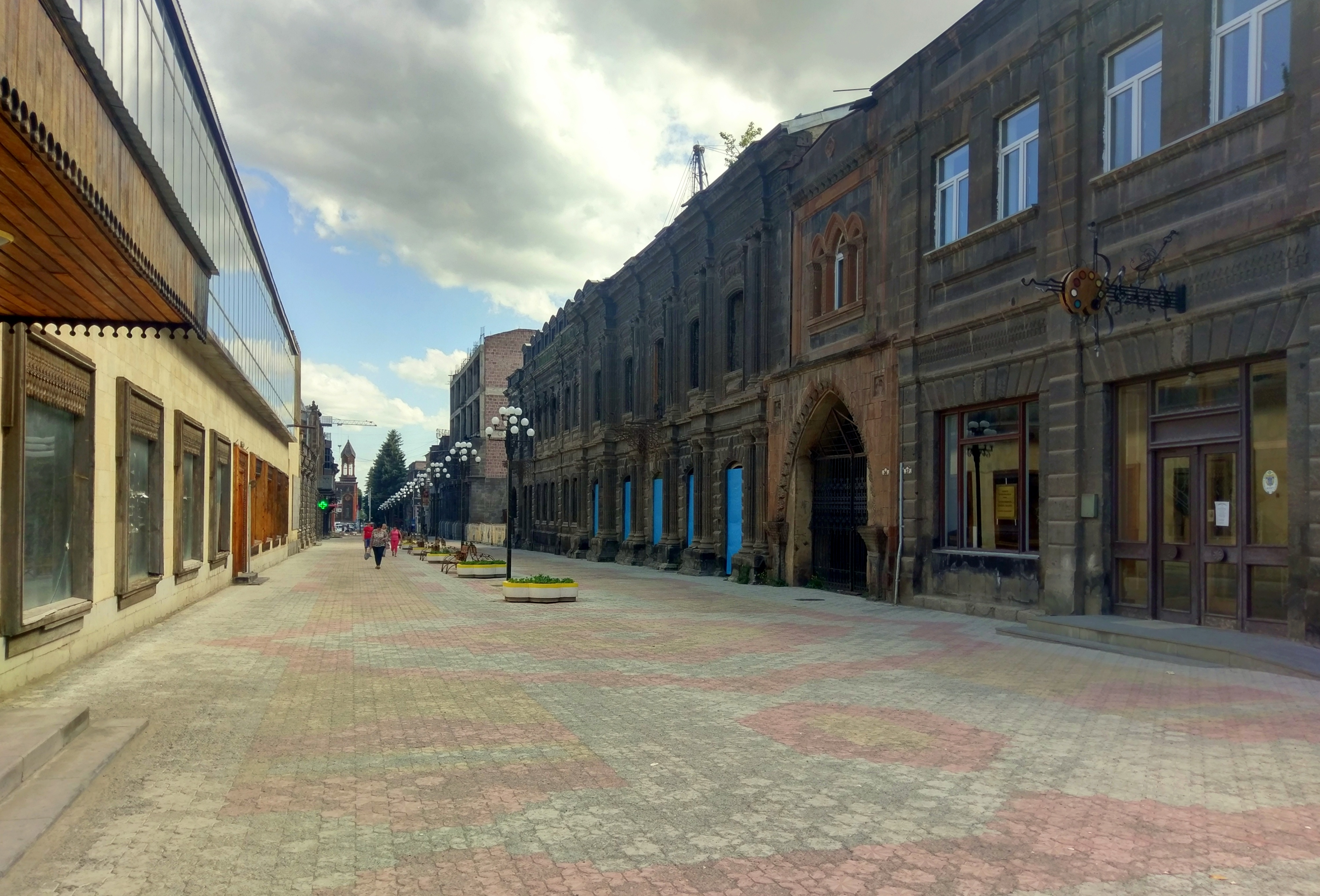
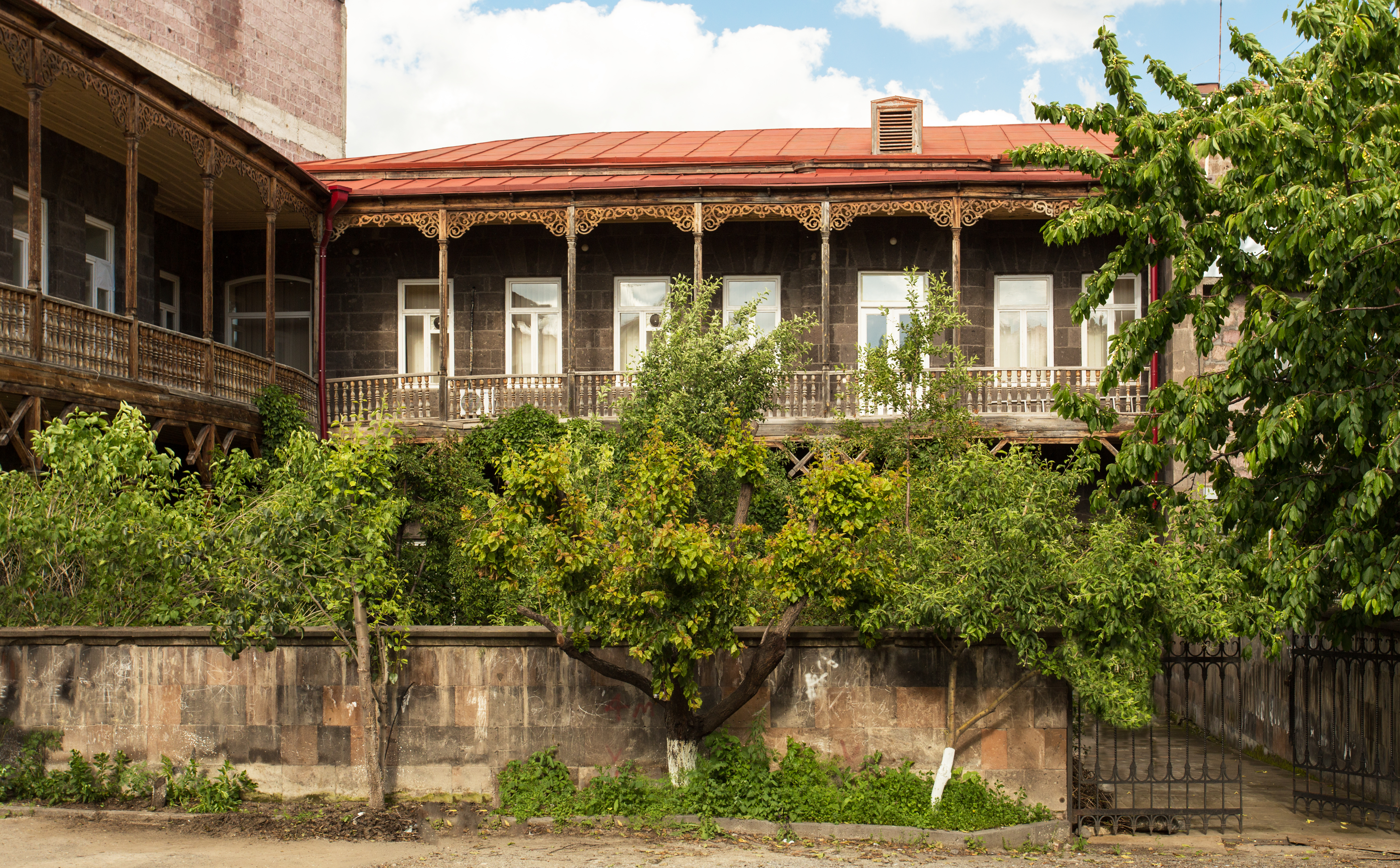
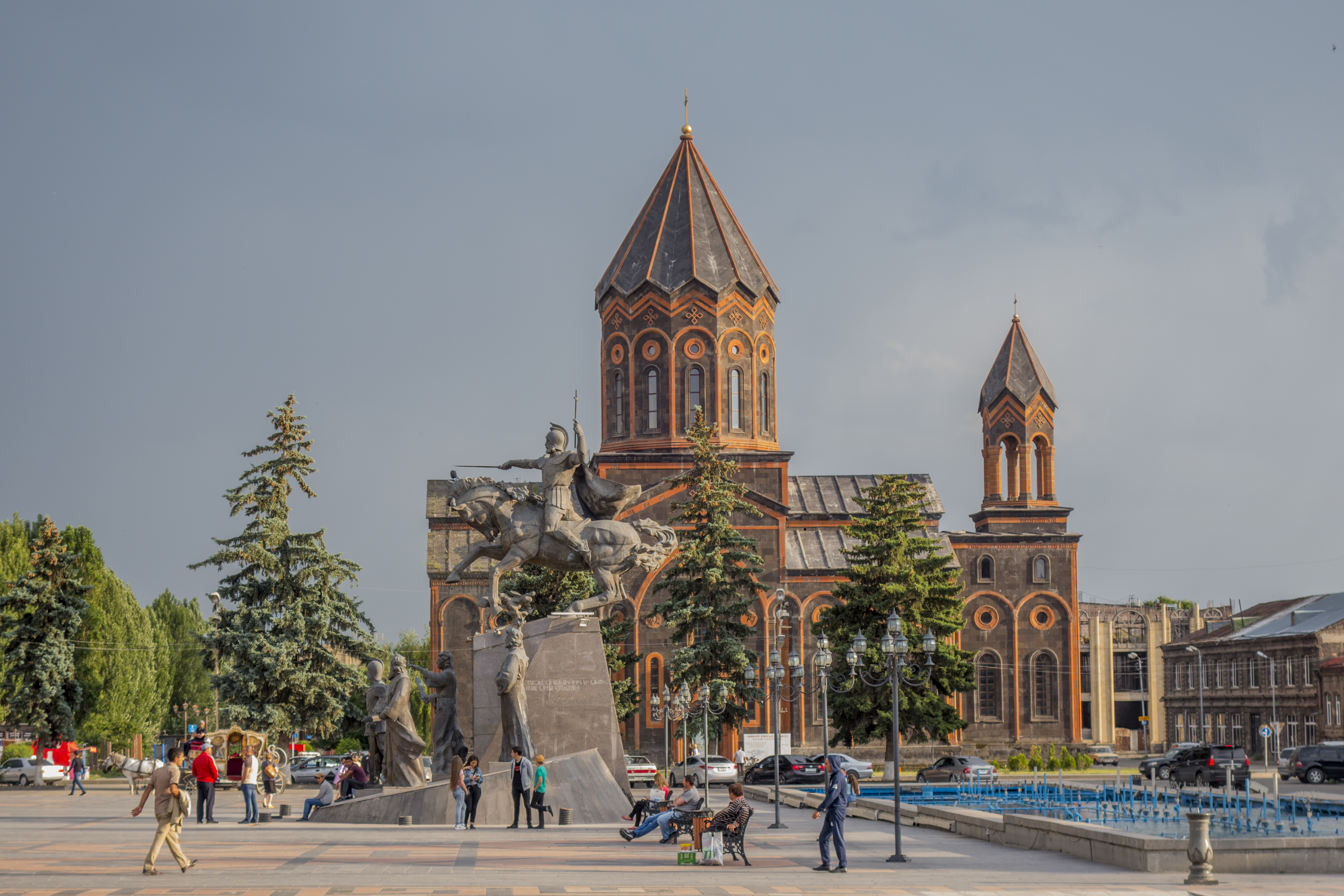
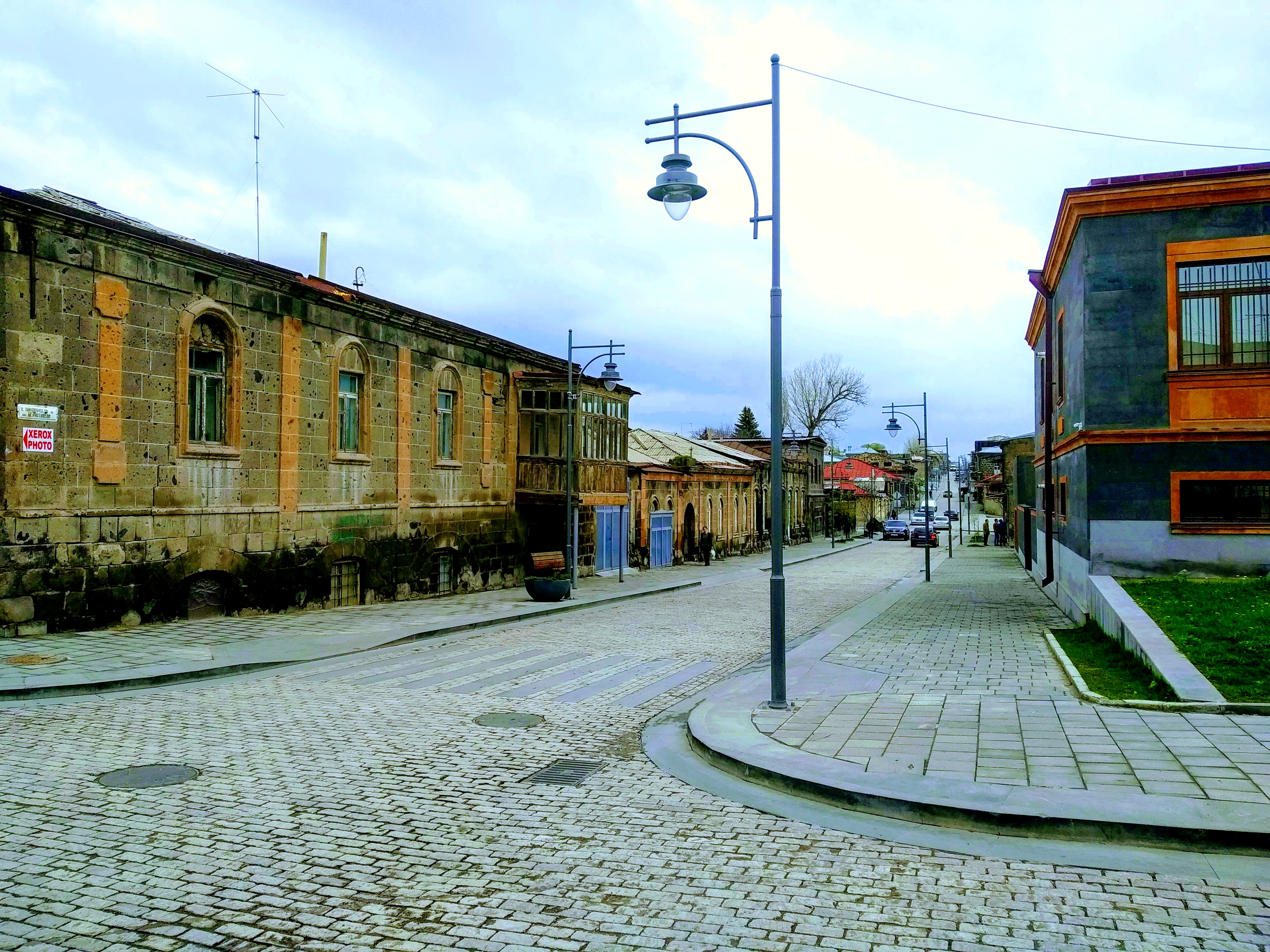
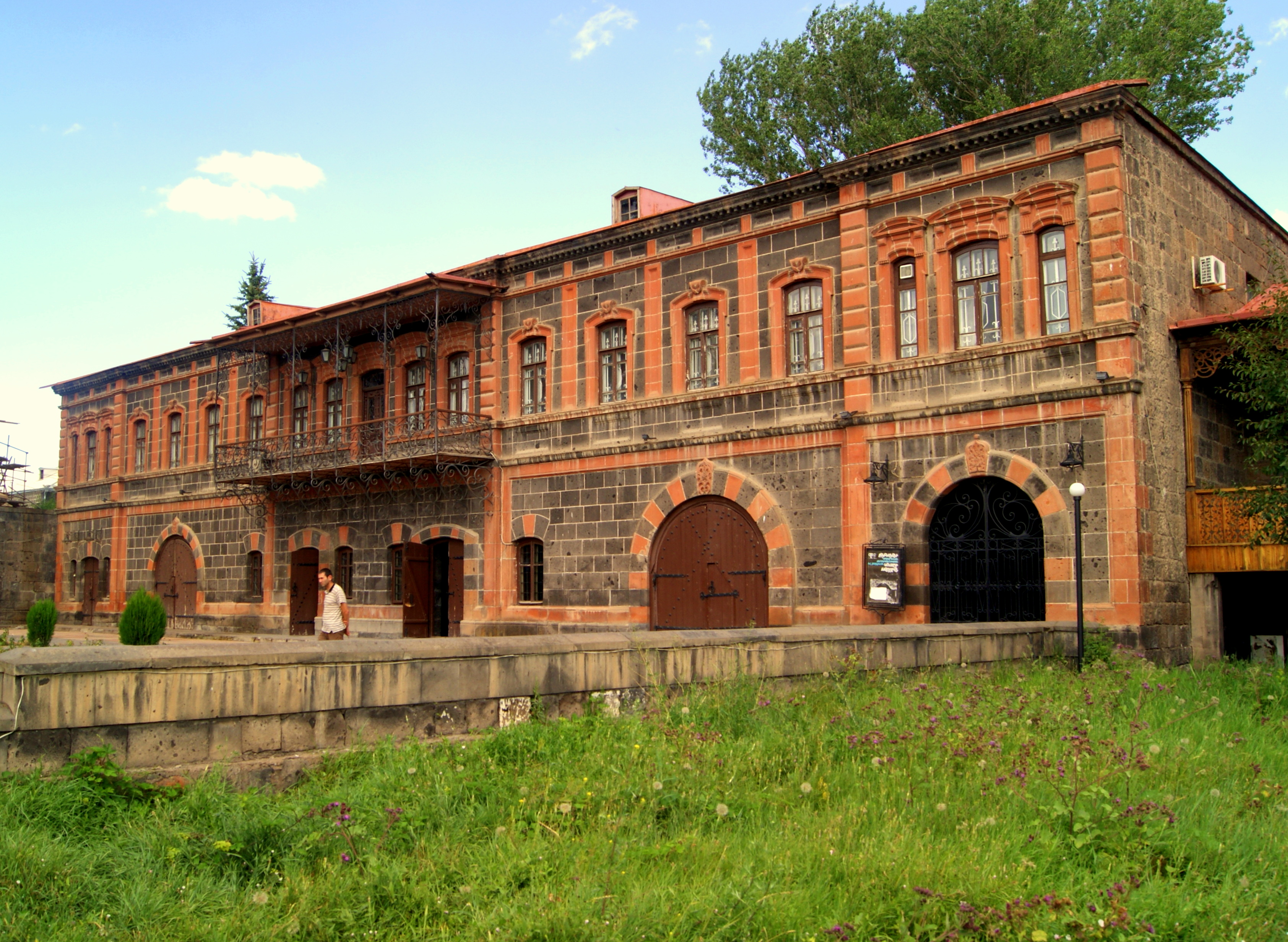
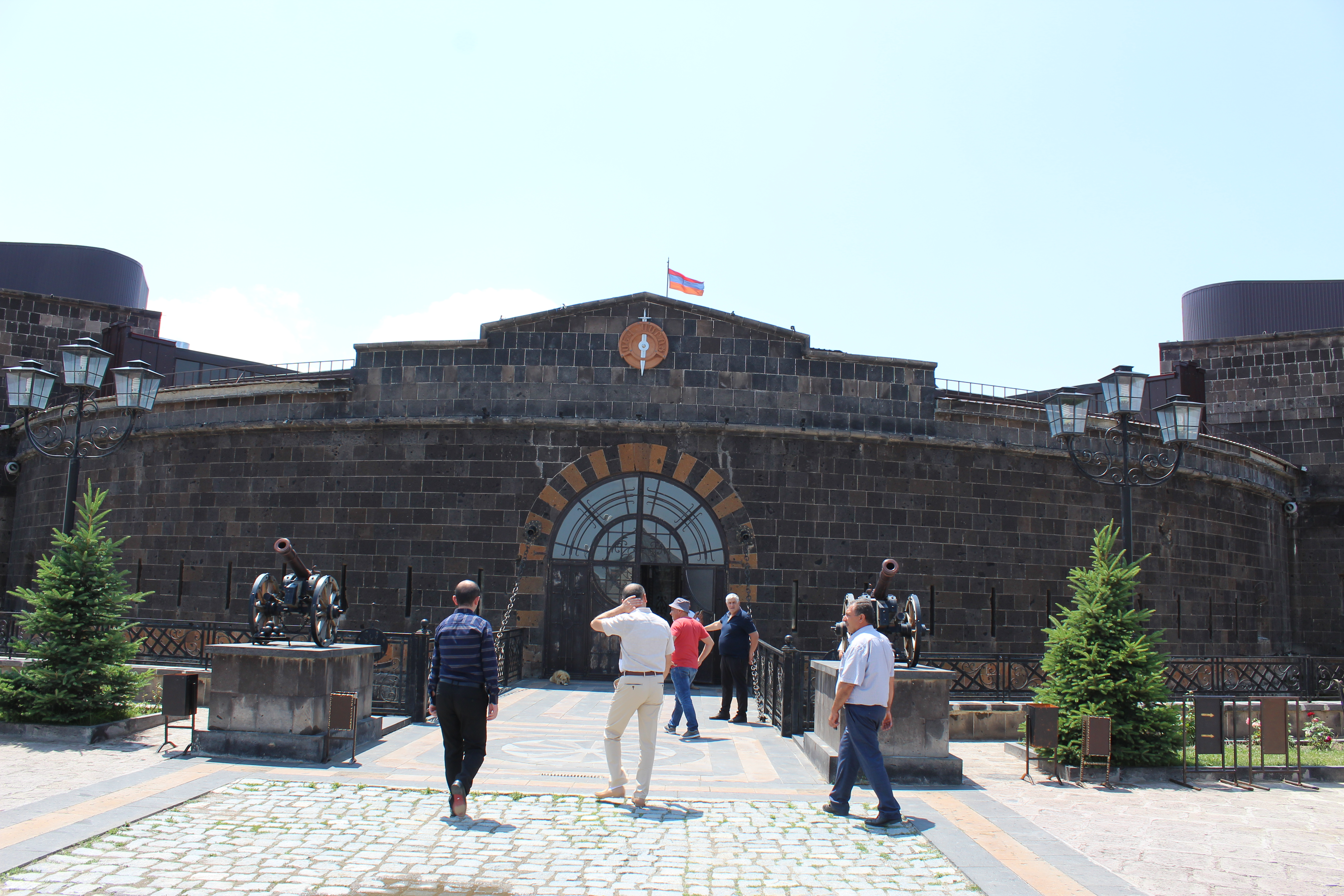
- From the top: Abovyan avenue, Aslamazyan Gallery, Holy Saviour’s Church, Rustaveli Street, Dzitoghtsyan Museum of National Architecture; Sev Berd Fortress
- City: Gyumri
- District: Kumayri
- Established: 5th century BC

Area
  - Total: 10 km^{2} (3.9 sq mi)
- Website: http://www.gyumri.am

The Kumayri historic district (Armenian: Կումայրի պատմական թաղամաս), also known as the Kumayri Historical and Cultural Museum-Reserve, is the oldest part of Gyumri with its own unique architecture. It has more than a thousand buildings dating back to the 19th and 20th centuries. The district is one of few places in Armenia, and the world, with authentic urban Armenian architecture. Almost all the structures of the Kumayri district have survived the two major earthquakes in 1926 and 1988 respectively. The historic district of Kumayri occupies the central and western part of modern-day Gyumri.

== History ==
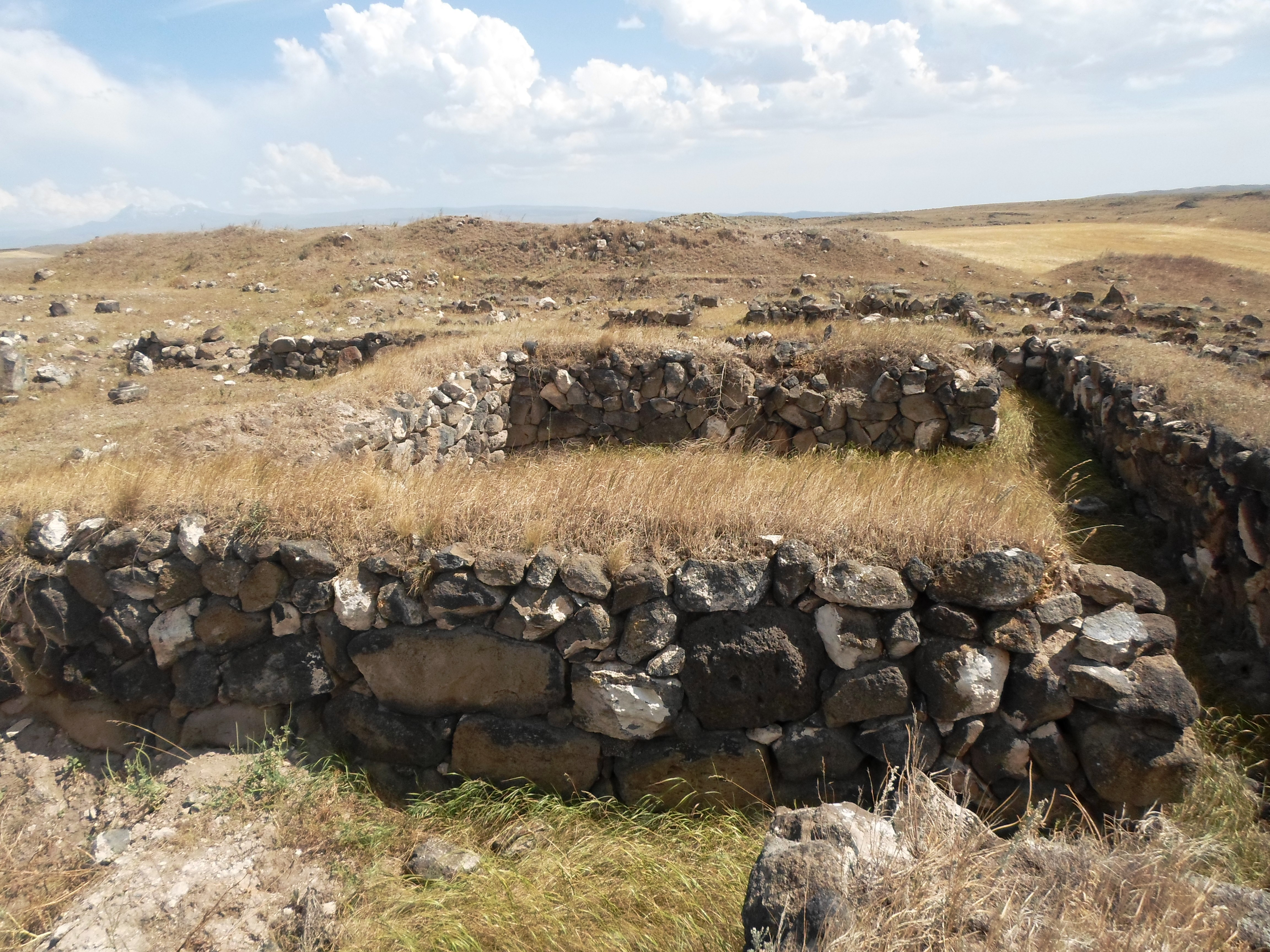
The Orontid settlement of Kumayri, 5th–2nd centuries BC

The area was first mentioned as Kumayri in the historic Urartian inscriptions dating back to the 8th century BC. Historians believe that Xenophon passed through Kumayri during his return to the Black Sea, a journey immortalized in his Anabasis.

Kumayri was again mentioned in 773 in accounts of the revolt against Arab domination led by Artavazd Mamikonyan that resulted in a revival of Armenian statehood. Later, during and after the reign of Bagratids, Kumayri developed into a well-built modern town that was a center of commerce for the region.

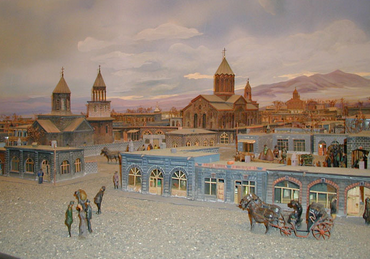
Diorama of old Kumayri with the Holy Saviour's Church (1859–1873)

In 1804, the Russian forces controlled over Shirak region at the beginning of the Russo-Persian War of 1804–1813. Kumayri became officially part of the Russian Empire at the Treaty of Gulistan.

During the period of Russian rule, Kumayri became one of the developing cities in the Transcaucasus. In 1829, in the aftermath of the Russo-Turkish War, there was a big influx of Armenian population, as around 3,000 families who had migrated from territories in the Ottoman Empire -in particular from the towns of Kars, Erzurum, and Doğubayazıt- settled in and around Kumayri.

A major Russian fortress was built on the site in 1837. Gyumri was finally formed as a town in 1840 to become the centre of the newly established Alexandropol uezd, experiencing rapid growth during its first decade. In 1849, the Alexandropol Uyezd became part of the Erivan Governorate. The town was an important outpost for the Imperial Russian armed forces in the Transcaucasus where their military barracks were established (e.g., at Poligons, Severski, Kazachi Post). The Russians built the Sev Berd fortress at the western edge of the city during the 1830s in response to the Russo-Turkish War of 1828–1829.

Alexandropol had been quickly transformed to become one of the major centres of the Russian troops during the Russo-Turkish War of 1877–1878. After the establishment of the railway station in 1899, Alexandropol witnessed a significant growth and became the largest city in Eastern Armenia. By the end of the 19th century, Alexandropol was home to 430 shopping stores as well as several workshops and cultural institutions.

The majority of the historic buildings in Kumayri date back to the 19th and 20th centuries. Monuments such the homes of important Armenian cultural figures and wealthy families from the pre-Soviet period, and several churches, including a Russian chapel, still stand.

== Monuments ==
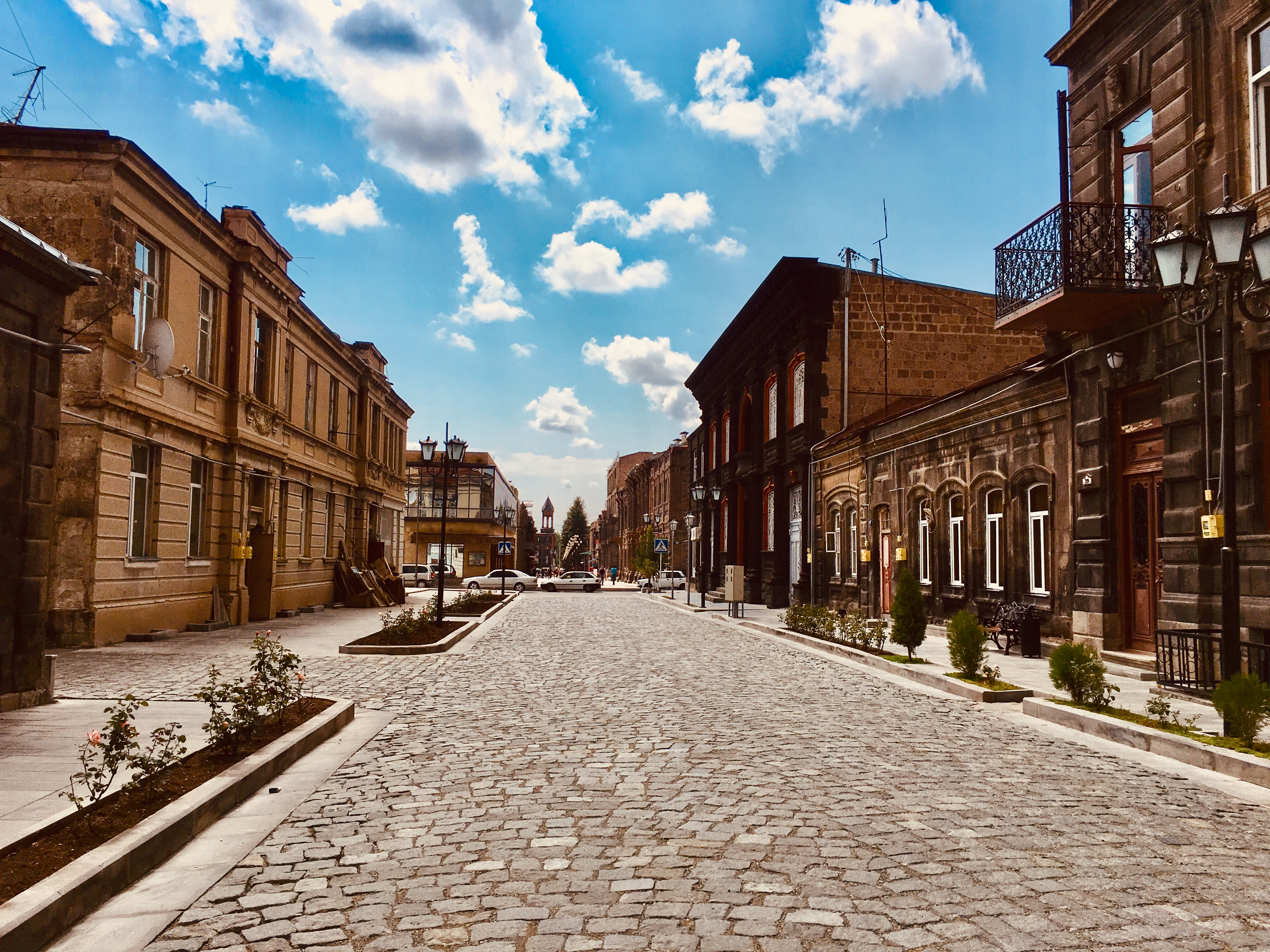
Abovyan Street in Kumayri

The historic district contains around 1,600 monuments of cultural significance that occupy the streets of Gorky, Abovyan, Rustaveli, and Vardapets.

=== Dzitoghtsyan Museum of National Architecture ===
The famous house of the Dzitoghtsyan family was built in 1872 by four brothers who migrated from the Western Armenian village of Dzitogh, to the city of Alexandropol. It is built with the famous red tuff stone of Shirak.

The house-museum, exhibits a collection of the Alexandropol social life characteristics, from the 19th century up to the 1920s. It also features the cultural, architectural and religious aspects of the city.

=== Gallery of Mariam and Eranuhi Aslamazyan Sisters ===
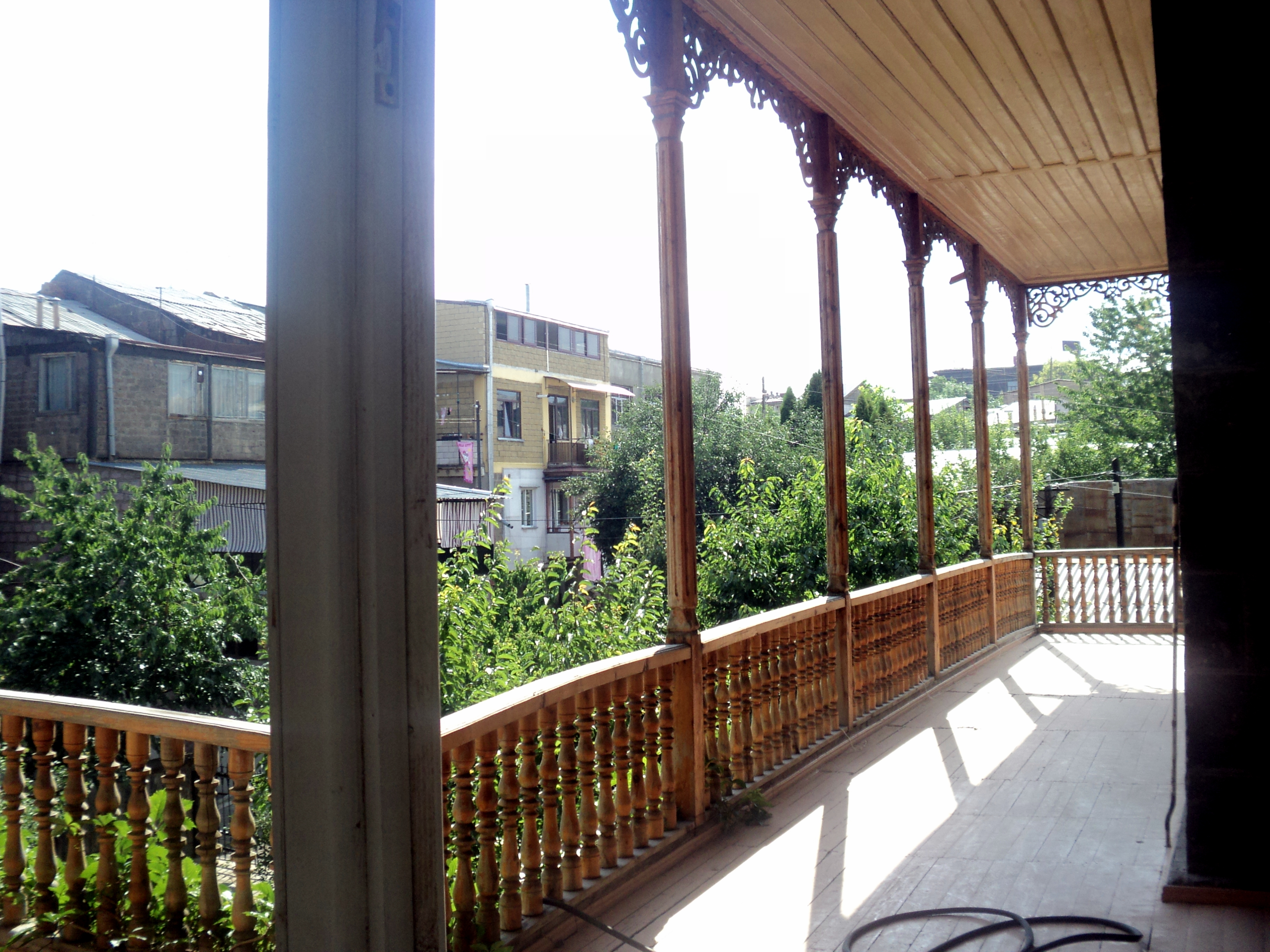
The 19th century style balcony of the Gallery.

The Gallery is located off the central square of Gyumri. The building was constructed as a private residence in 1880 by the Qeshishyan family, who were known to be wealthy merchants. After the ruinous earthquake of 1988 the building of the gallery was given to the homeless people and was reopened in 2004. It is the only museum named after female artists and devoted to female artists in Armenia. This building has been protected by the government since 1980 as a historical and cultural heritage site.

=== Holy Saviour's Church, Gyumri ===
Armenian Apostolic Church in the center of Kumayri. It was completed in 1872 and consecrated in 1873. The construction was fulfilled through the donations of the population of Kumayri and the Drampyan family.

The design of the church was derived from the architecture of the Cathedral of Ani. However the Holy Saviour Church is much larger than the Cathedral of Ani.

=== Hovhannes Shiraz House-Museum ===
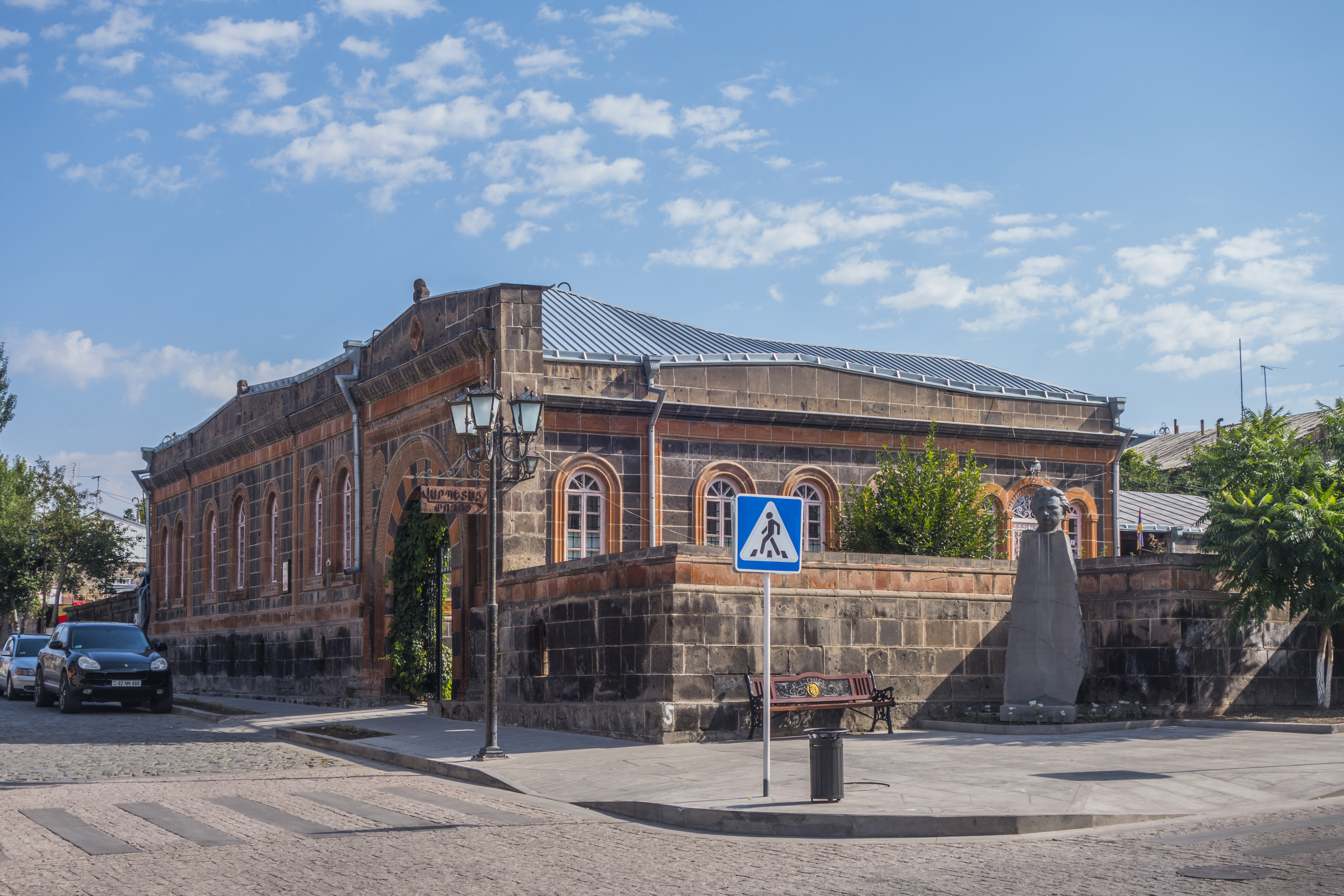
Hovhannes Shiraz House-Museum

The building was built in 1886, with red tuff stone of Shirak Province, and was the home of a wealthy merchant named Qeshishyan. During most of the Soviet period, it was used as a storehouse. In July 1983, not wanting to wait until Shiraz's death to honour him, government officials offered Shiraz a home to live in. However, the poet only lived in this house for a year, as he died in March 1984.

In order to preserve his legacy, the building later became a house-museum by the resolution of the Government of Armenia.

=== Black Fortress (Sev Berd) ===
Black fortress that was built on top of a hill following Russian control of the region. The full fortification took a decade after the first stones were laid in 1834. The fortress is a 360-degree round structure made of black stone, from which it gets its name. After Russia's loss in the Crimean War, Sev Berd was upgraded and designated a "first-class" fortress. It never underwent a siege, but was of strategic importance in victories over the Turks in subsequent wars that lasted through 1878. The fortress was downgraded to "second-class" status in 1887, after the final Russo-Turkish War of 1877–1878 that saw Russia gain strongholds in Kars and Batumi.

=== Cathedral of the Holy Mother of God, Gyumri ===
Built in 1884, the church of the Holy Mother of God belongs to the cruciform style of the Armenian churches with an external rectangular shape. The belfry is located at the top of the main entrance on the western side of the building. The church is topped with a large dome at the center surrounded with 2 minor domes. Unlike other Armenian churches, the altar at the Holy Mother of God is unique for its multi-iconic decoration.

=== Poloz Mukuch Beerhouse ===
Restaurant and prominent beerhouse in Gyumri. It was opened during the 1960s in Soviet Armenia and located in the historic district of Kumayri. It occupies an old mansion built in the 1860s. The beerhouse is named after humorist Mkrtich Melkonyan (1881-1931), a native of Gyumri, better known as Poloz Mukuch. Nowadays, the beerhouse is one of the prominent landmarks of the city of Gyumri.

=== Paris Hotel ===
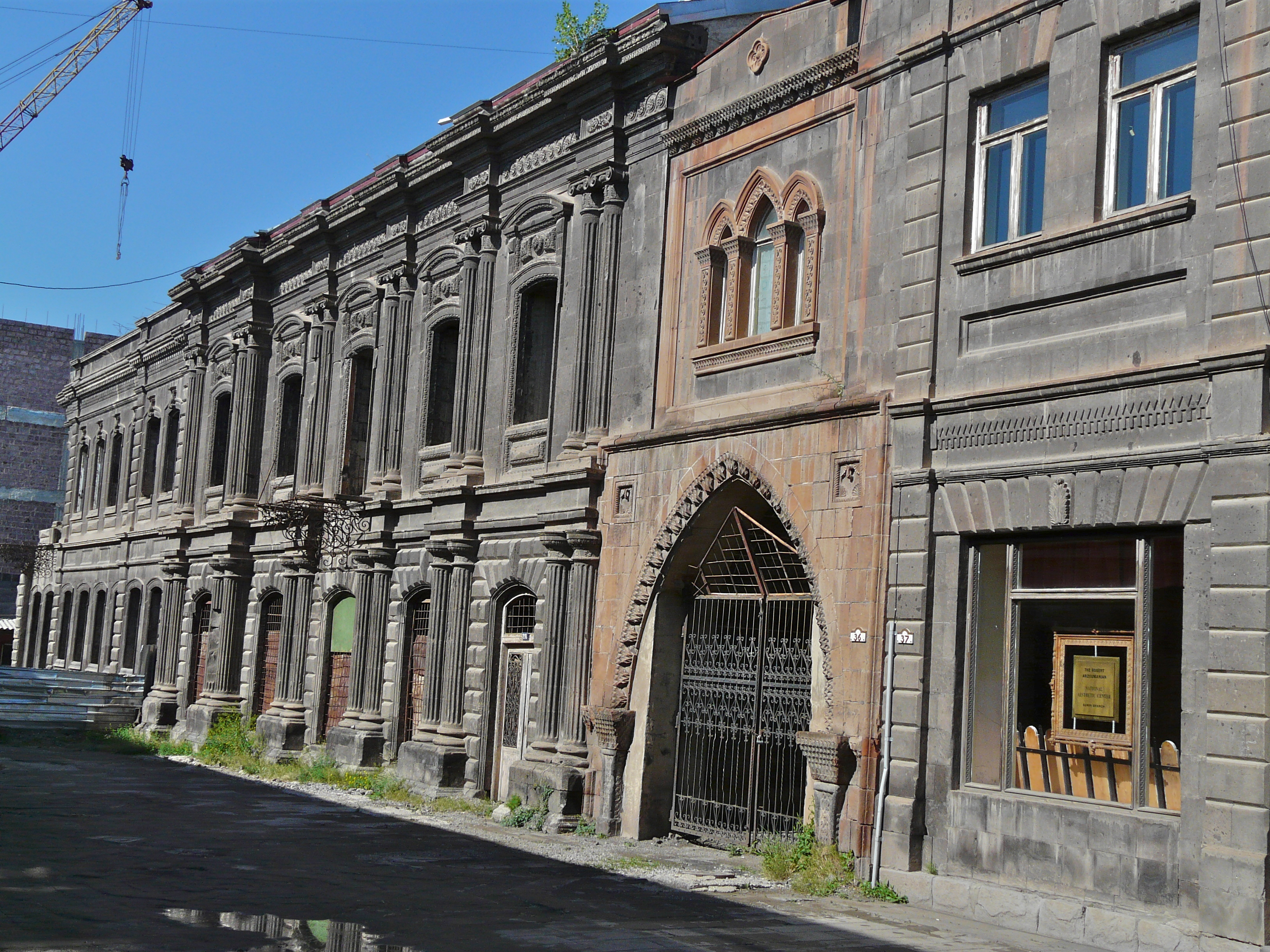
The Paris Hotel

The Raphaelyan House, built in the 1880s by the wealthy family of that name as a rental apartment building. Later, the building became the Paris Hotel, and during the Soviet period, it served as a maternity hospital. Currently, the building is being reconstructed by its private owners.

=== Russian Orthodox Church ===
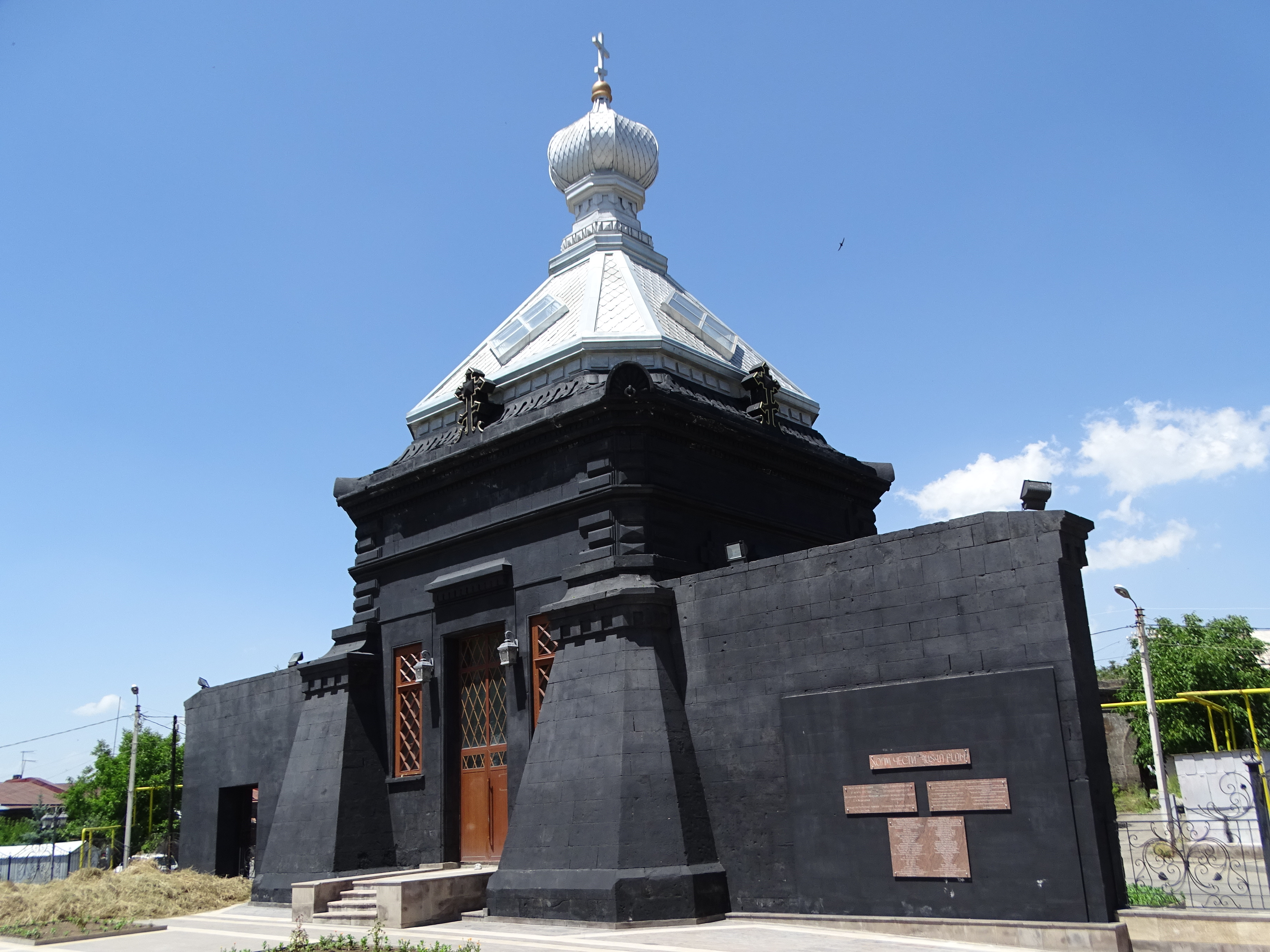
Russian Church Gyumri

The church was built in the southern part of the town. In the first half of the 19th century the hill was used as a Christian cemetery, where civilians and soldiers were buried. In 1853, the complex got the name of “Hill of Honor”. This church is a vivid example of a small classical Russian church built of Armenian black tuff stone and bears the name of St. Michael Arkhistratig. Because of the roof’s tin material, the Alexandrapol people were used to use plplan (meaning shining or sparkling) to describe the dome of the church. During the Soviet rule the church served as repository.

== Gallery ==
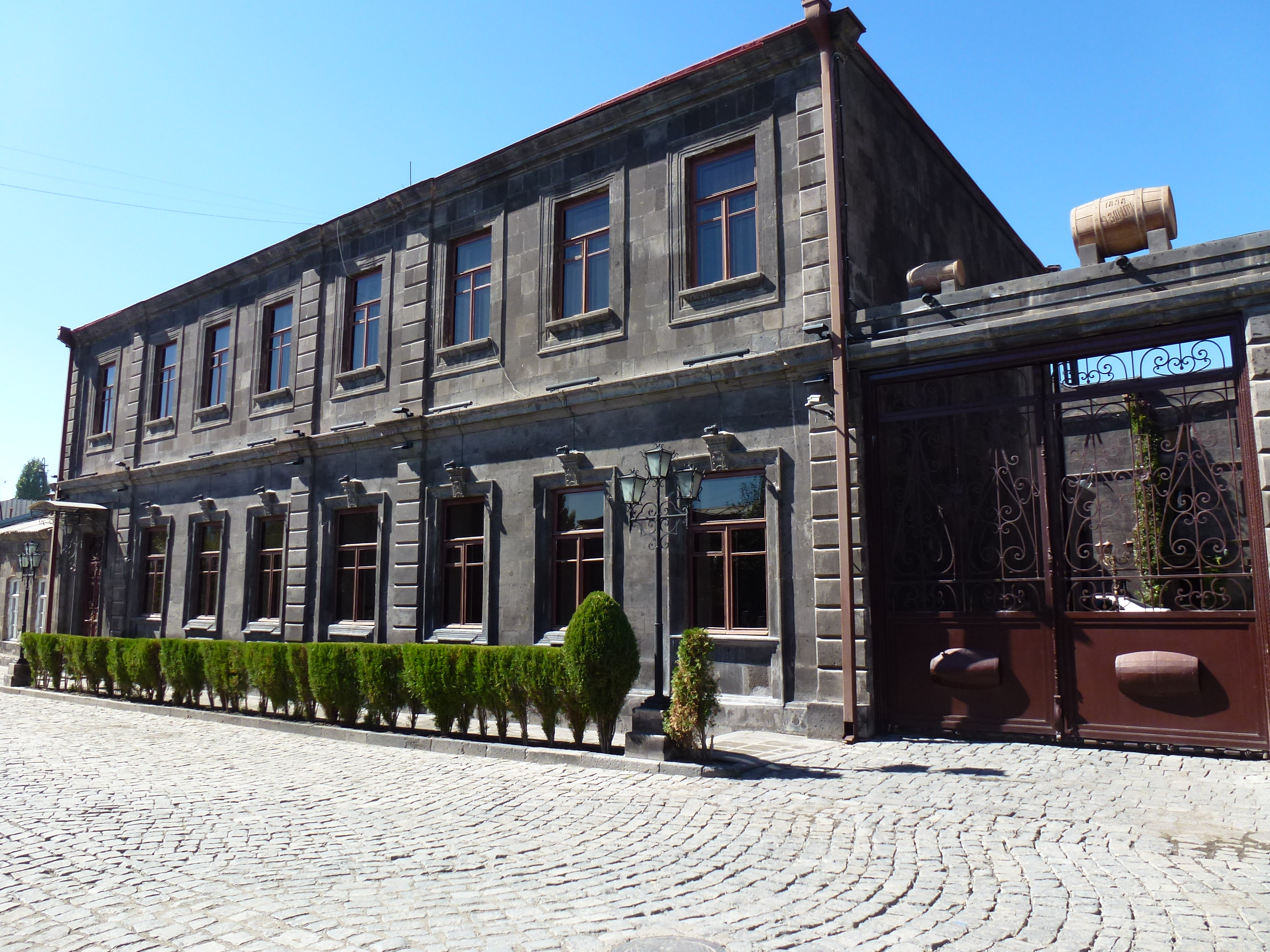

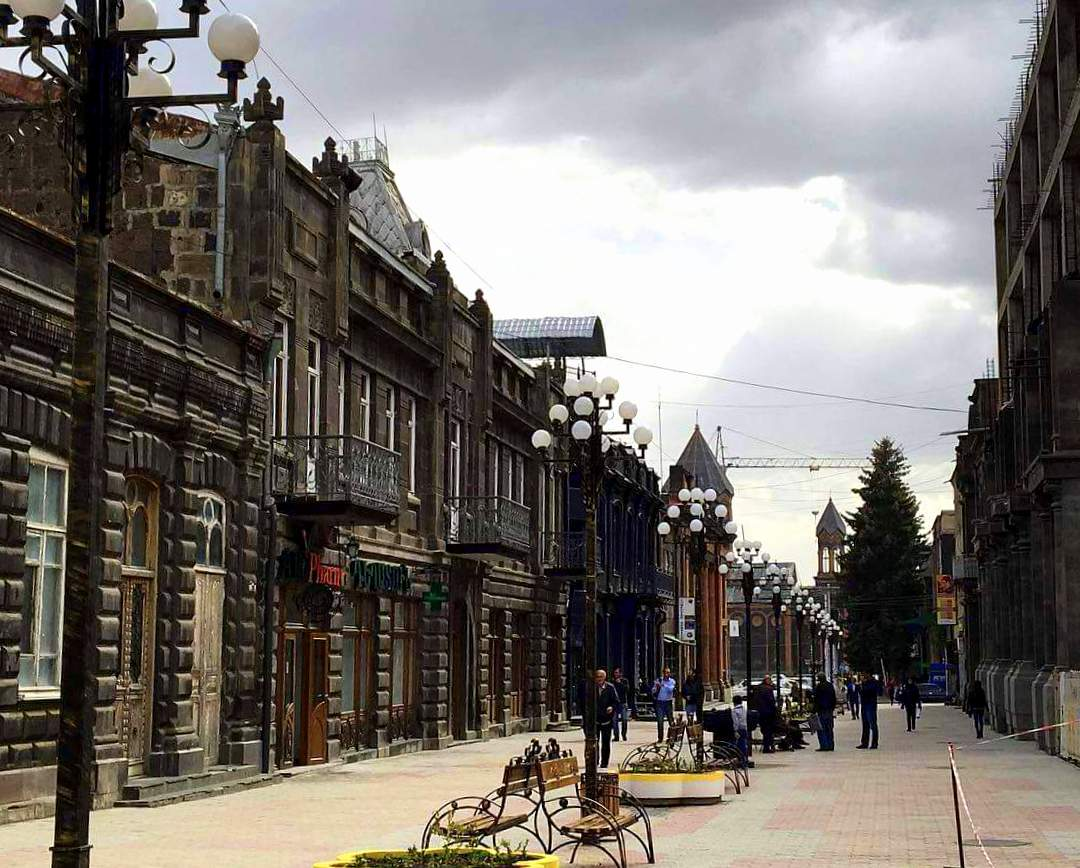

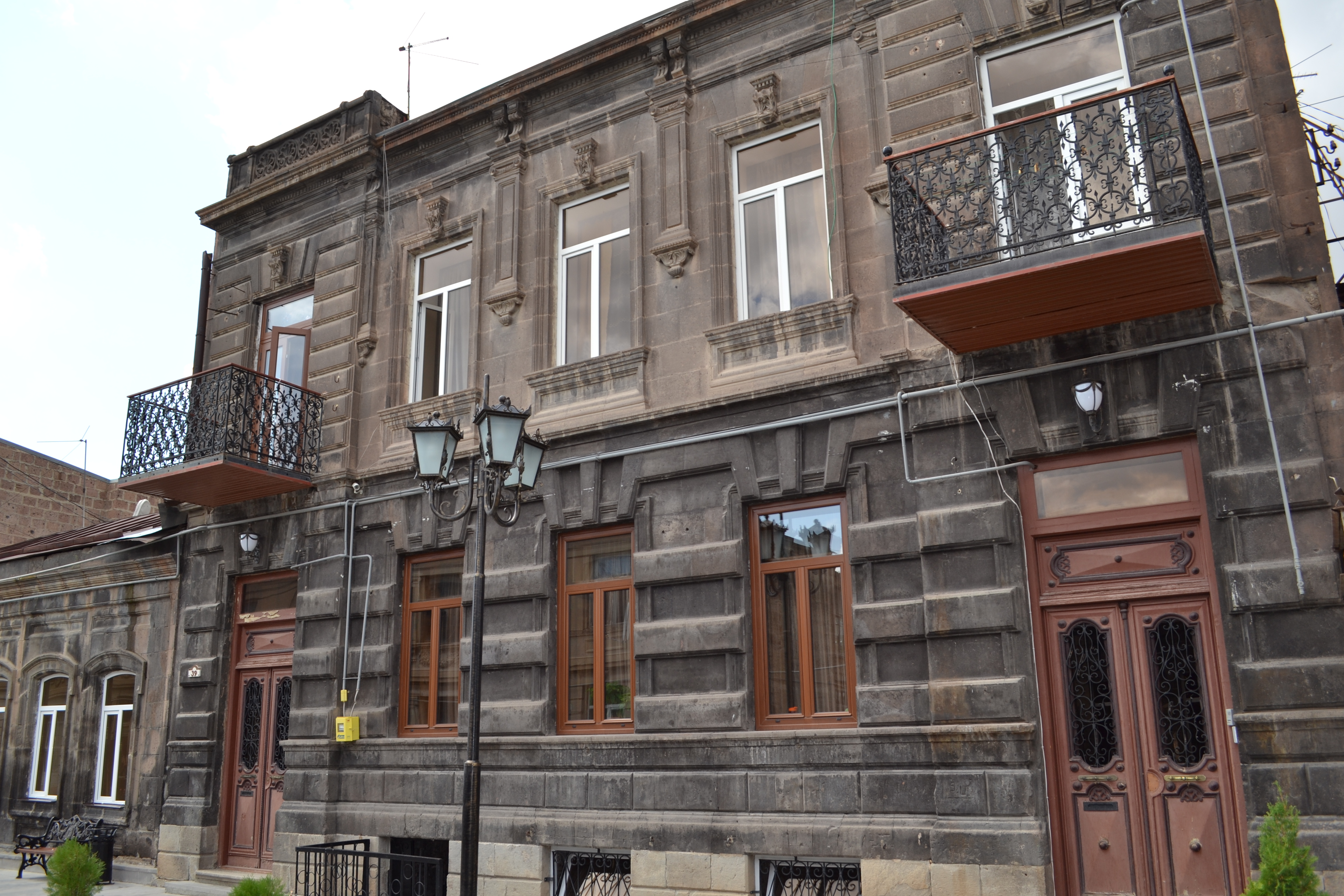

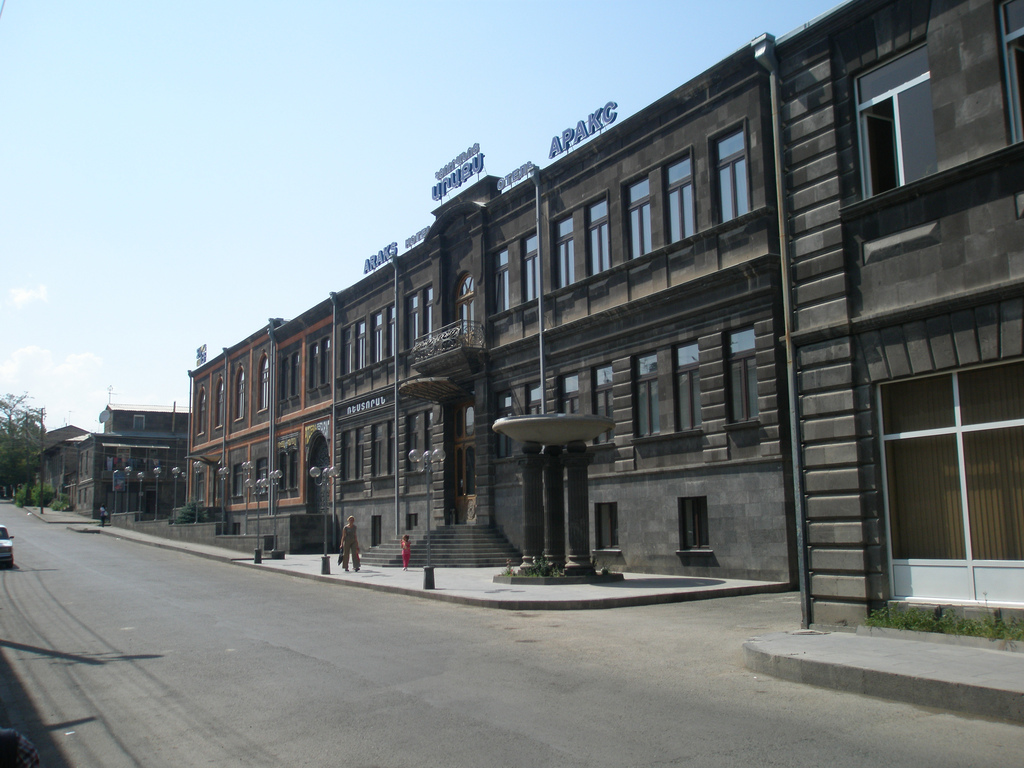

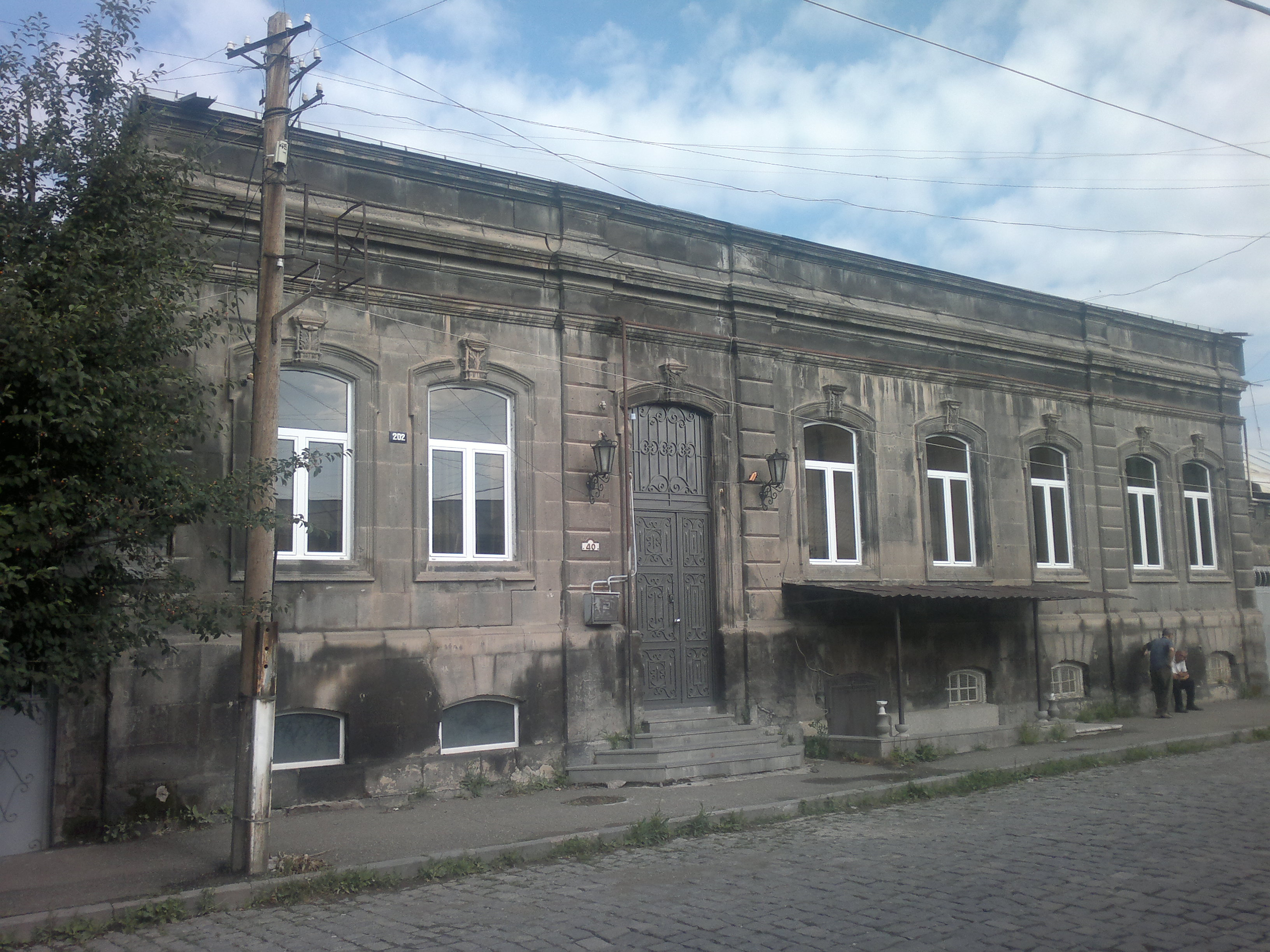

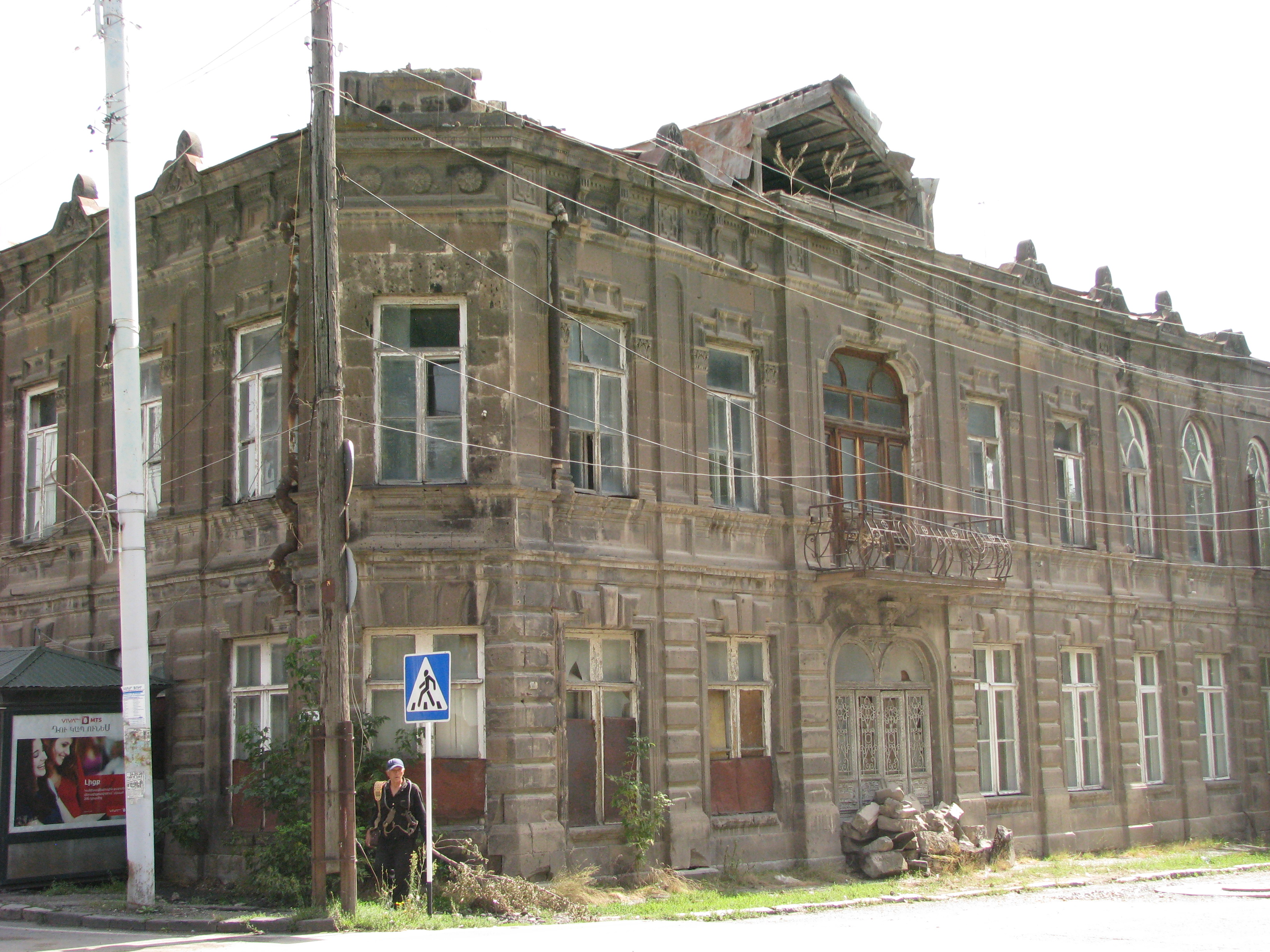

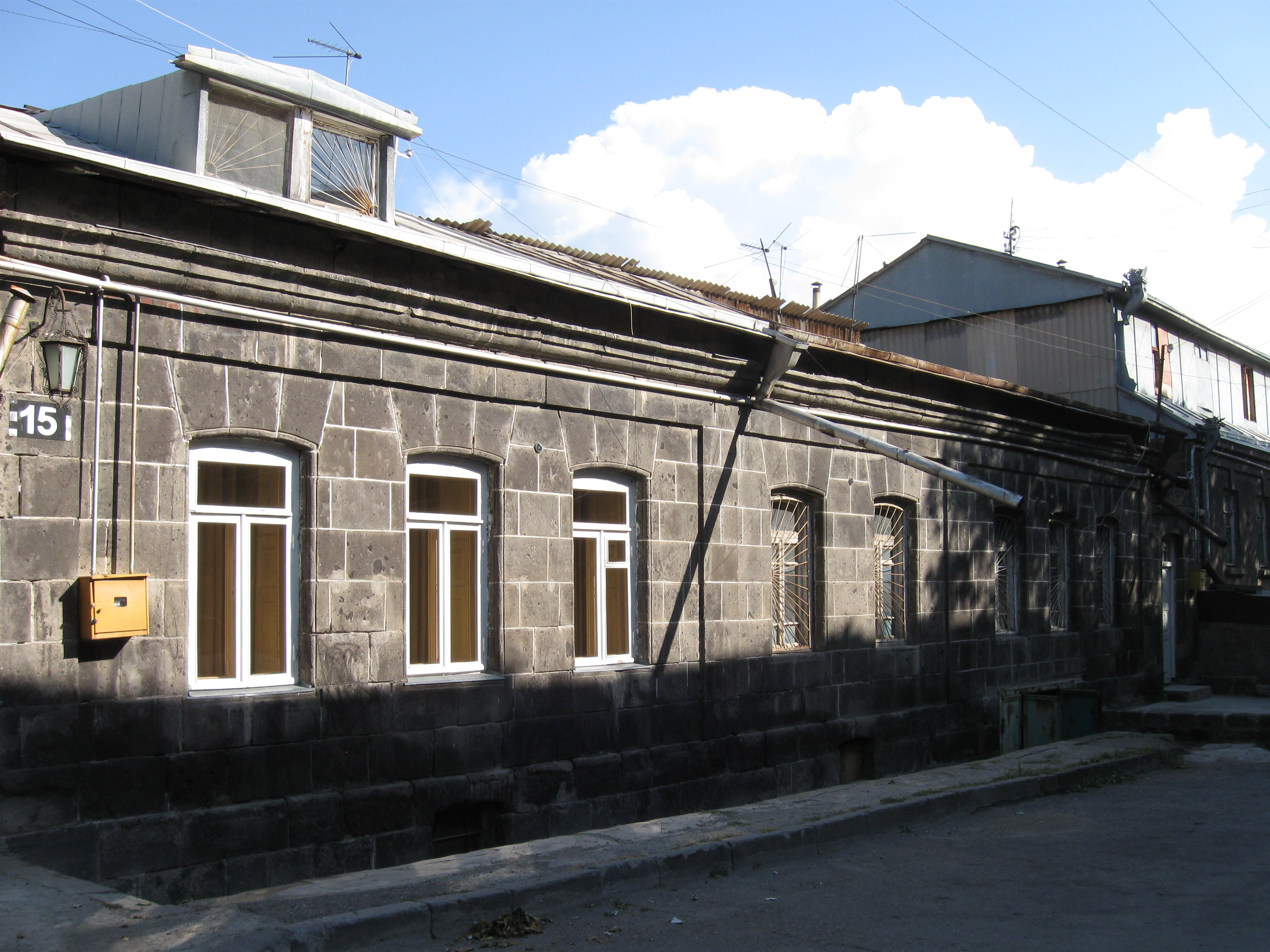

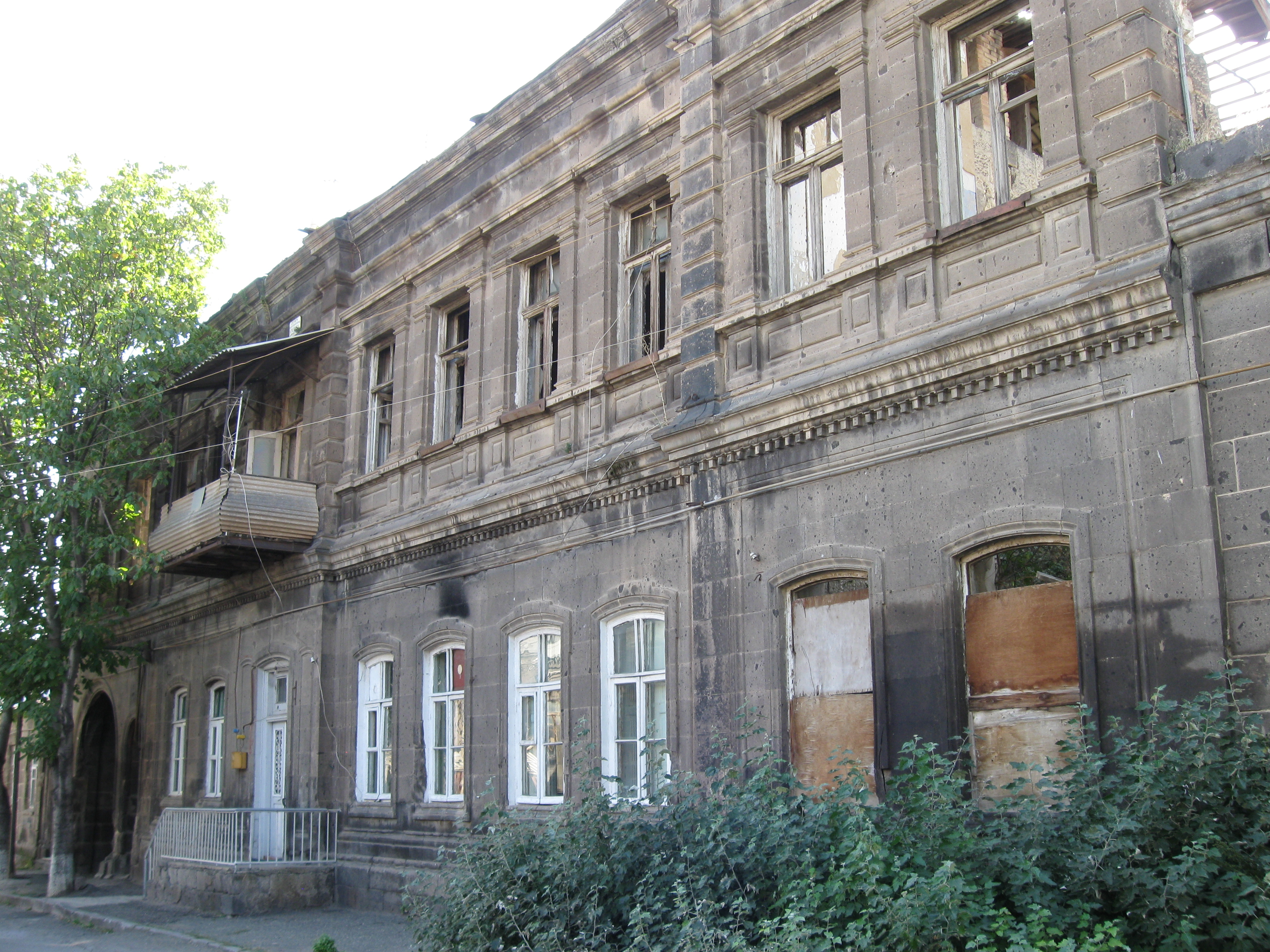

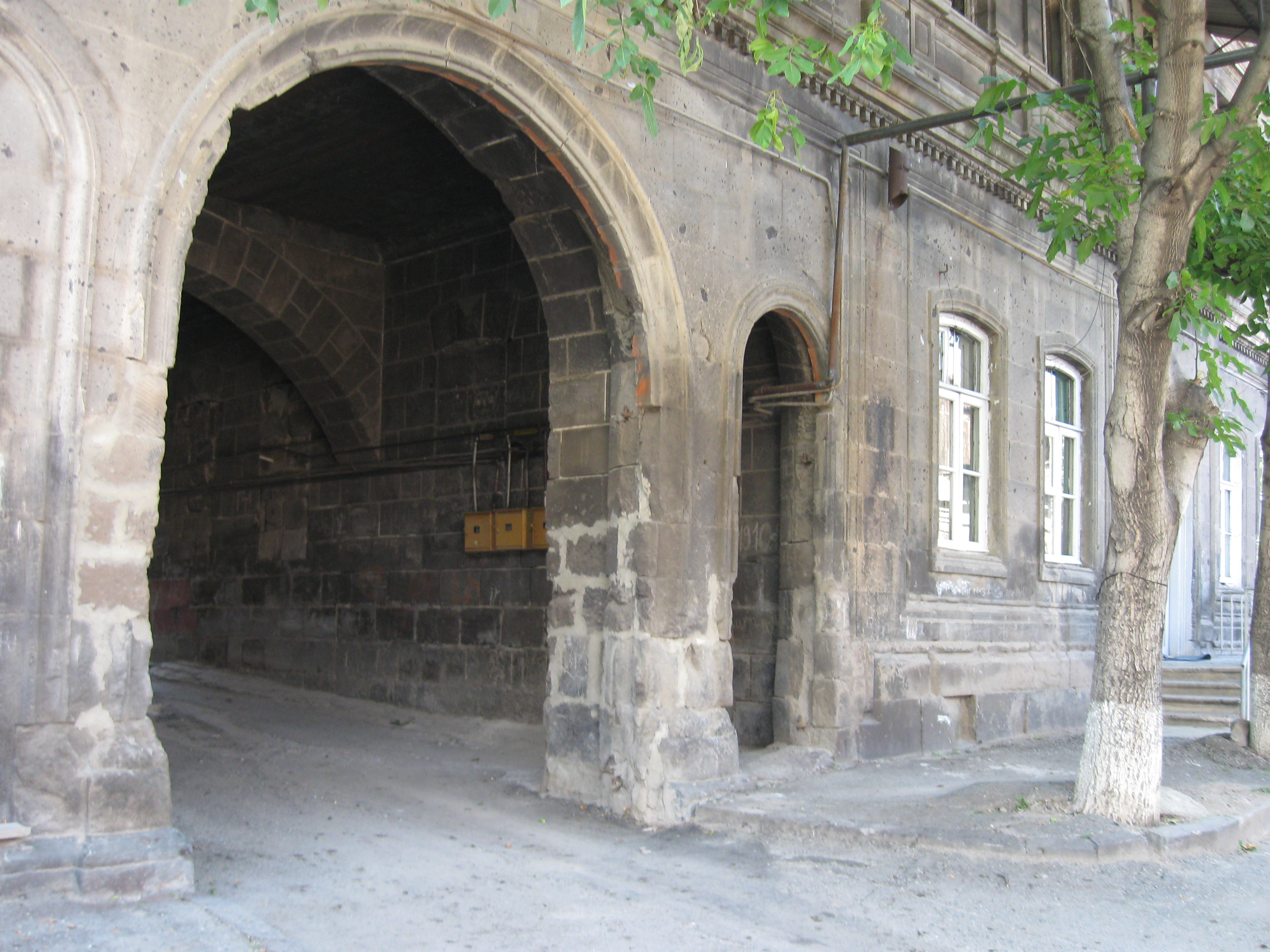

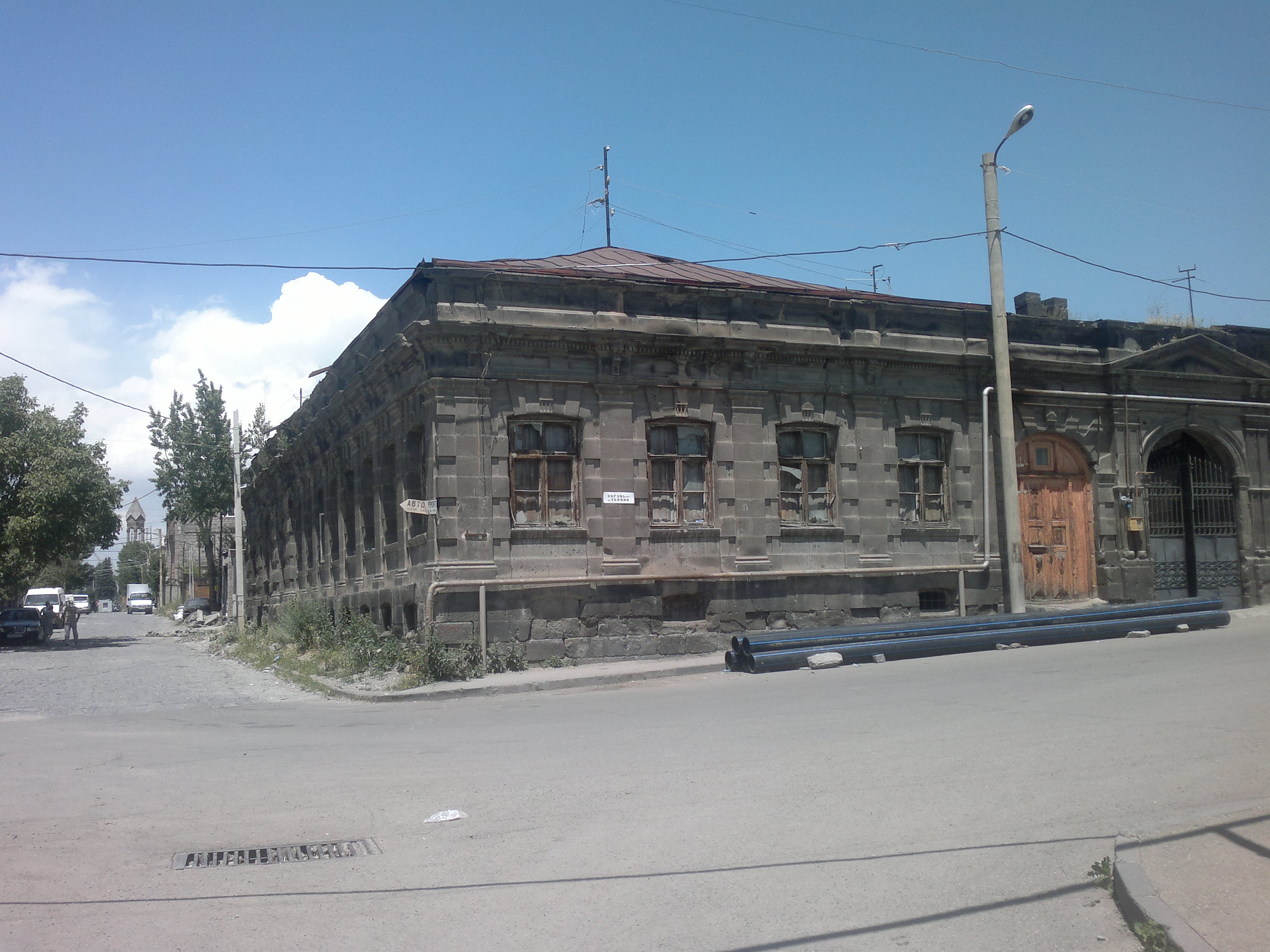

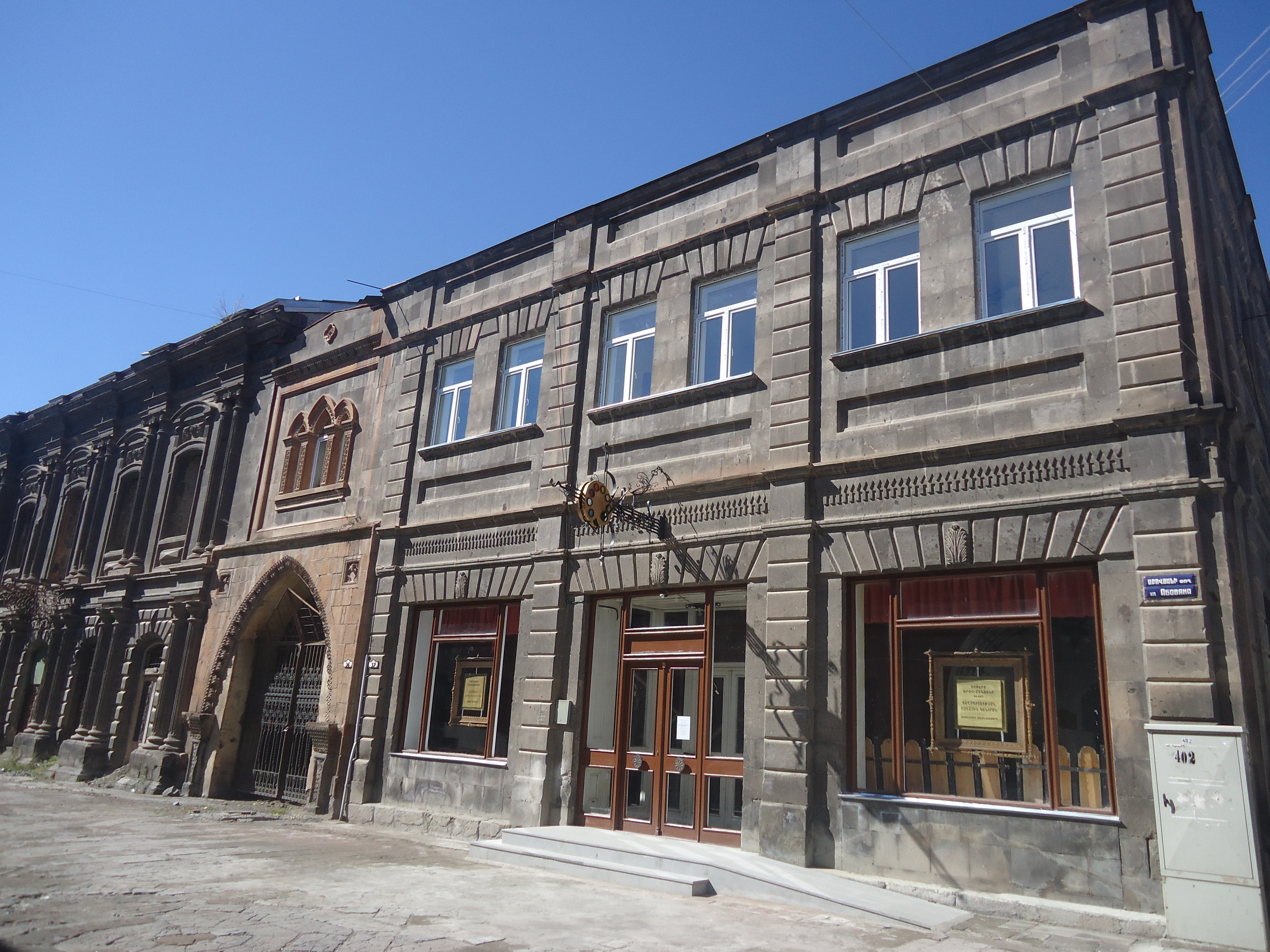

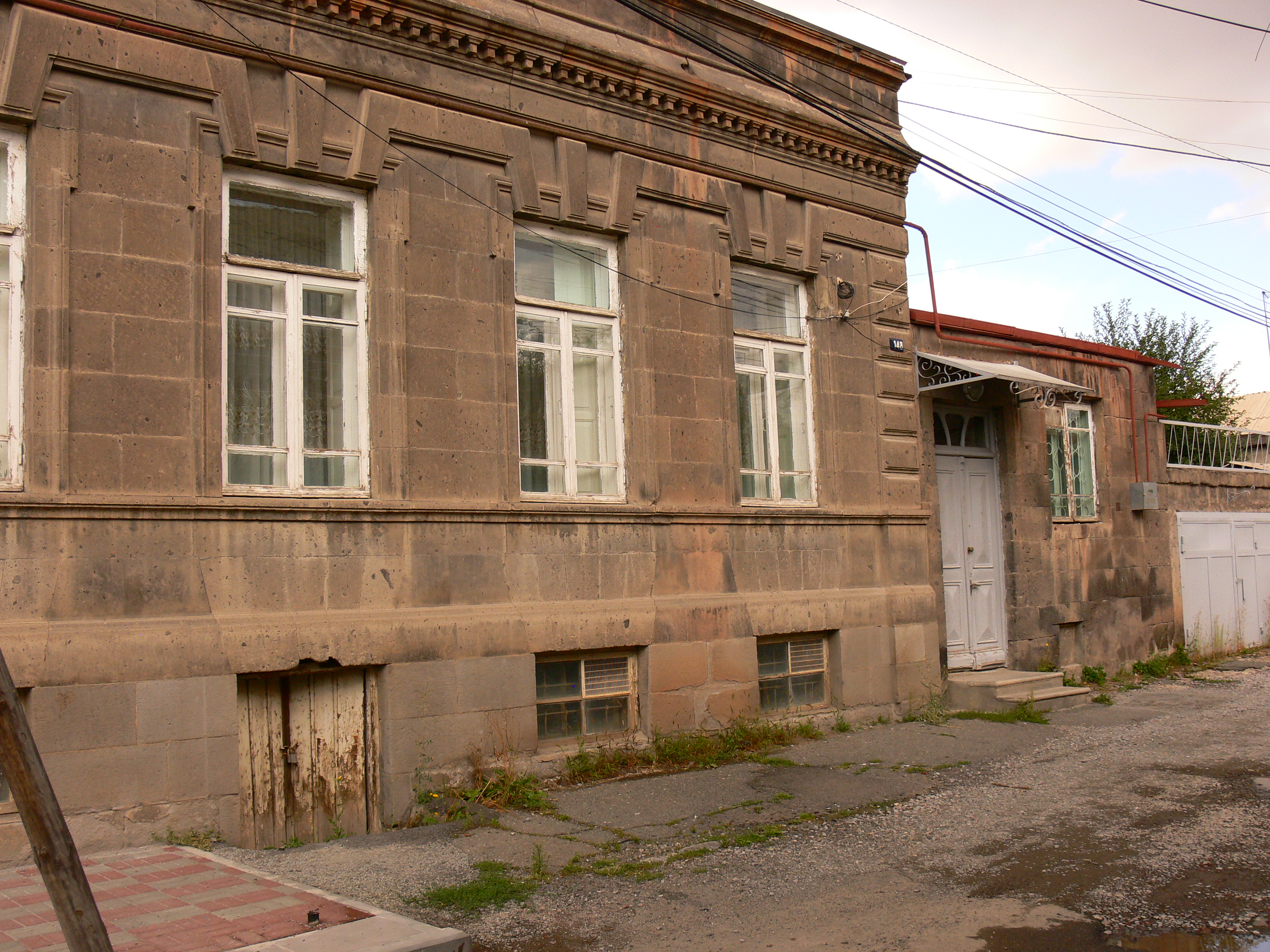

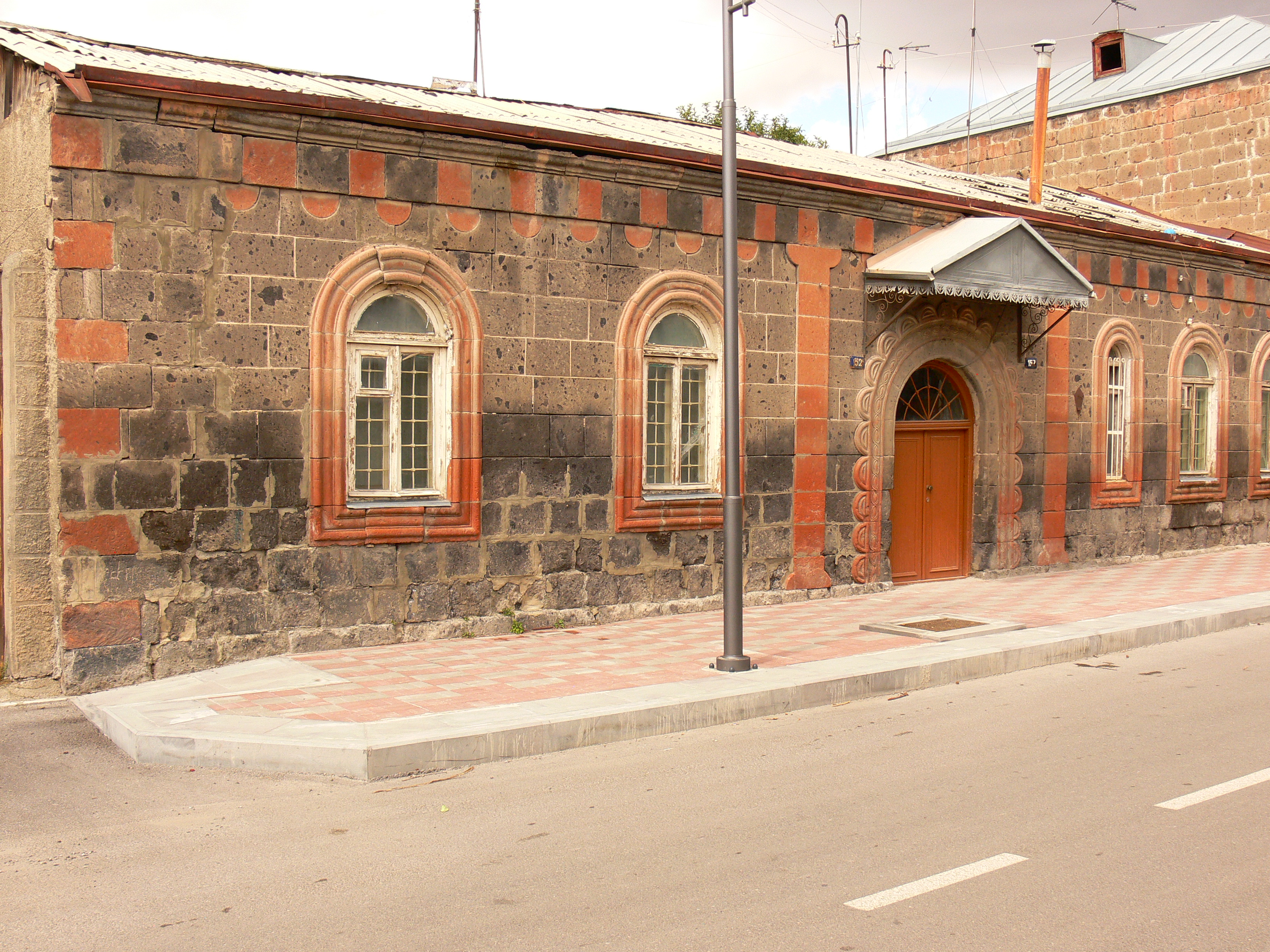

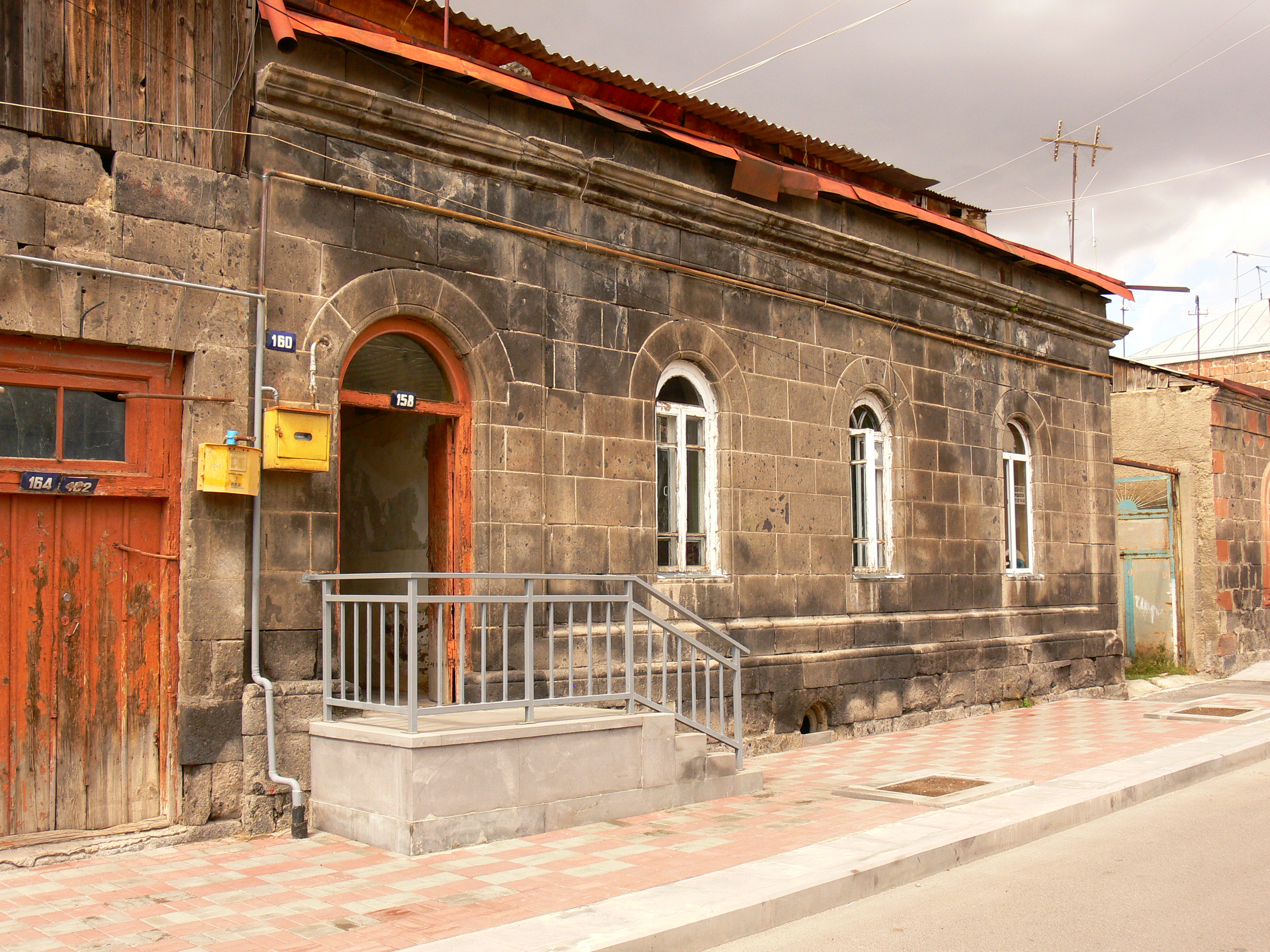

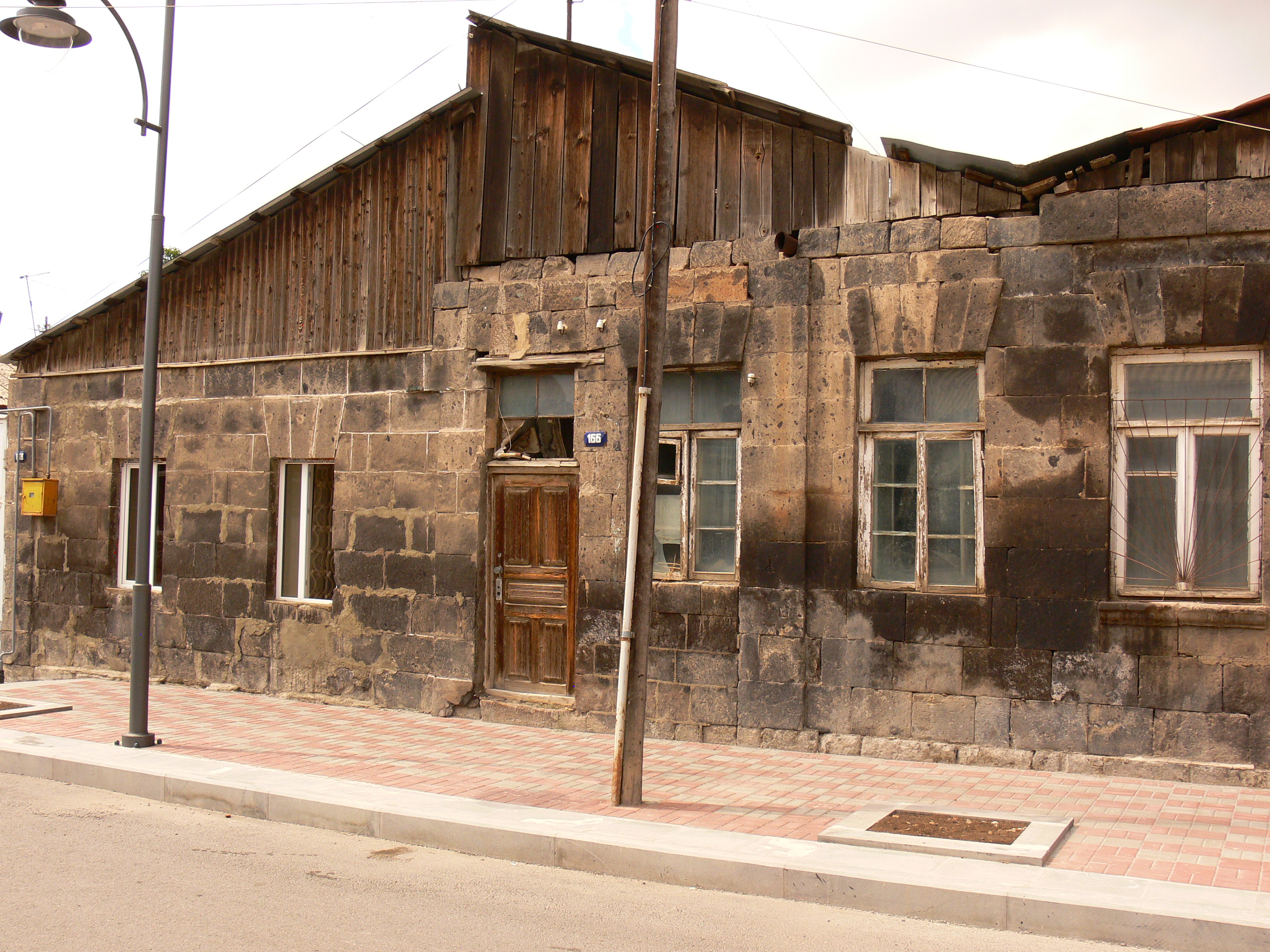

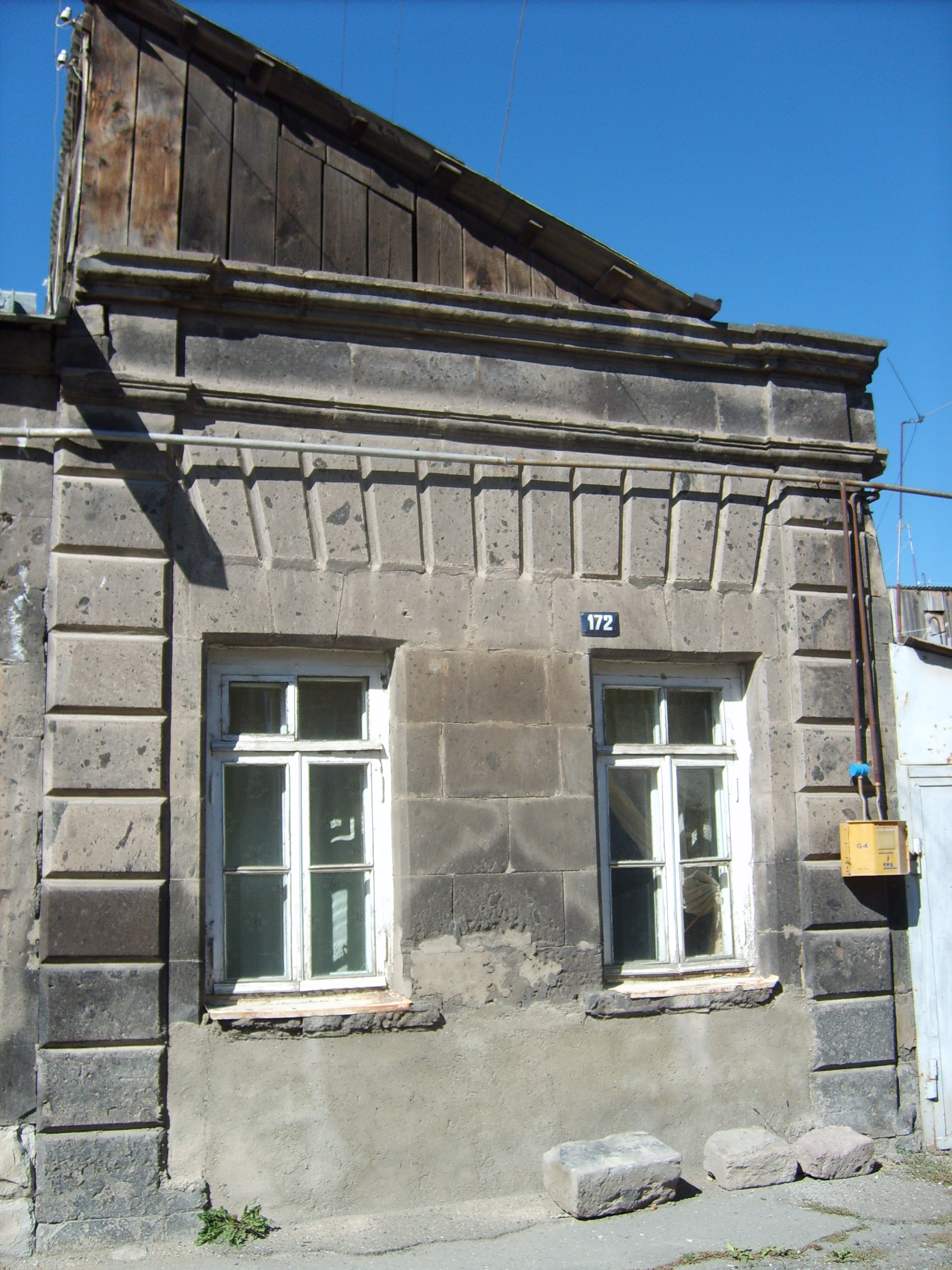

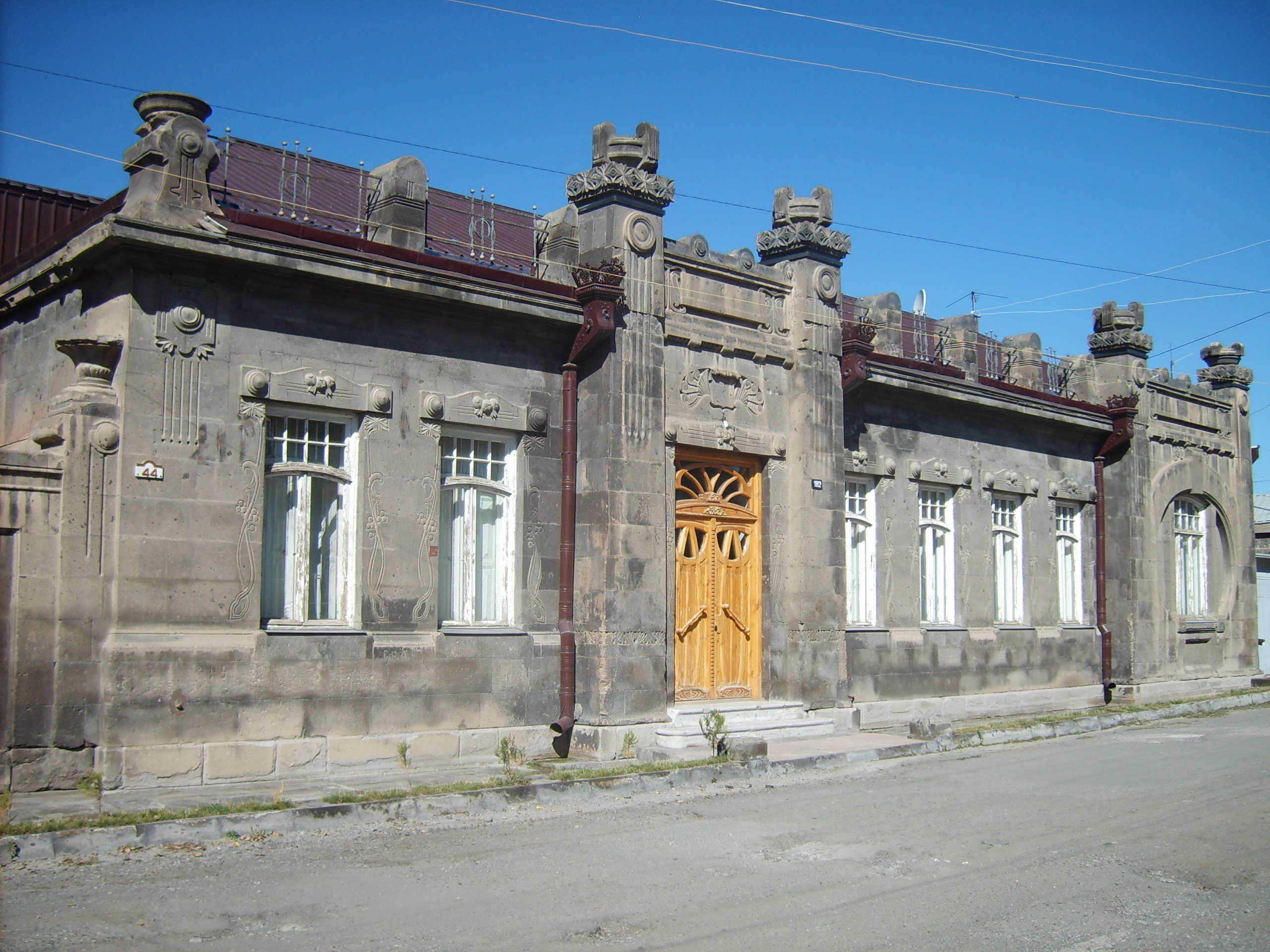

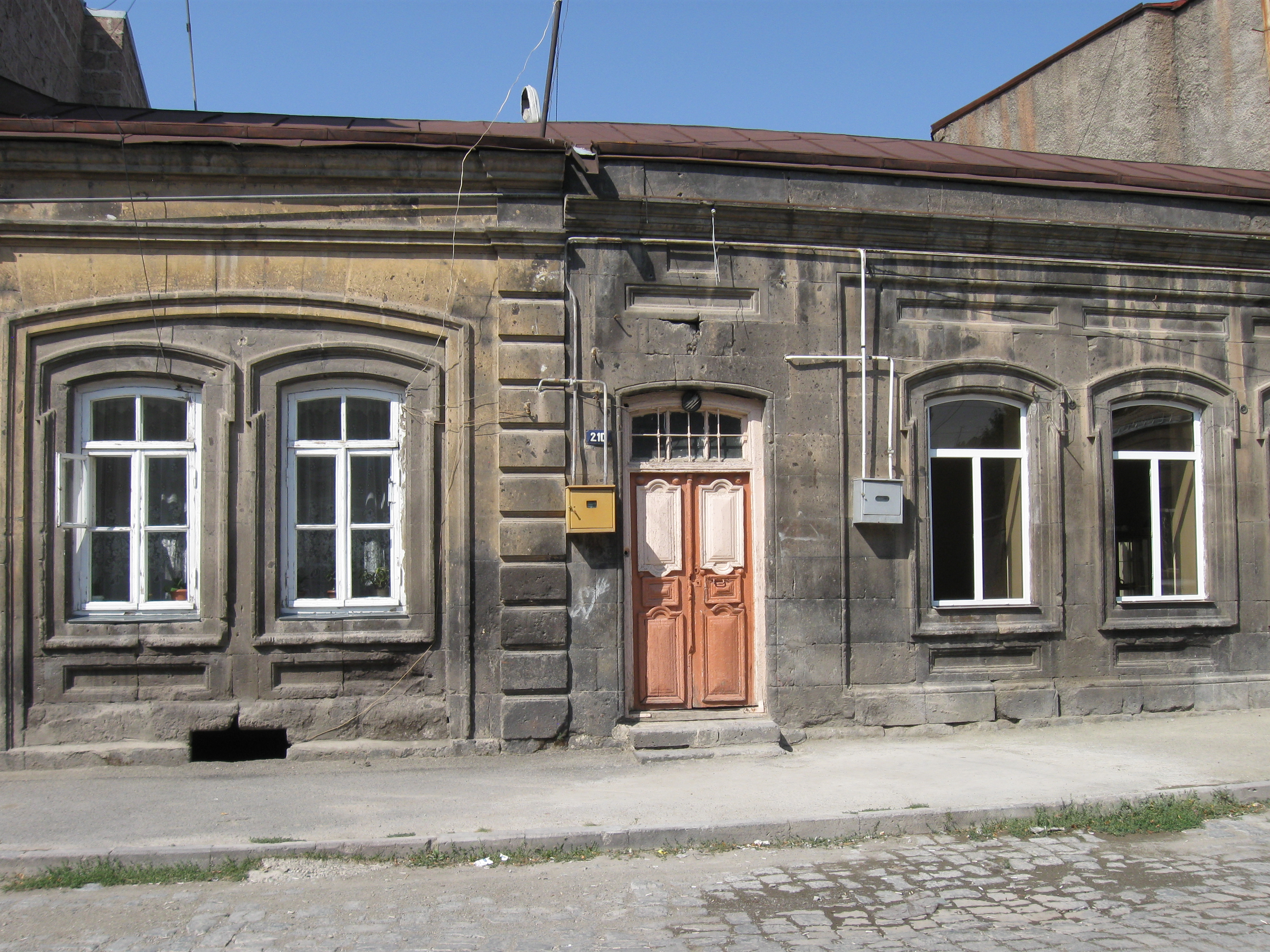

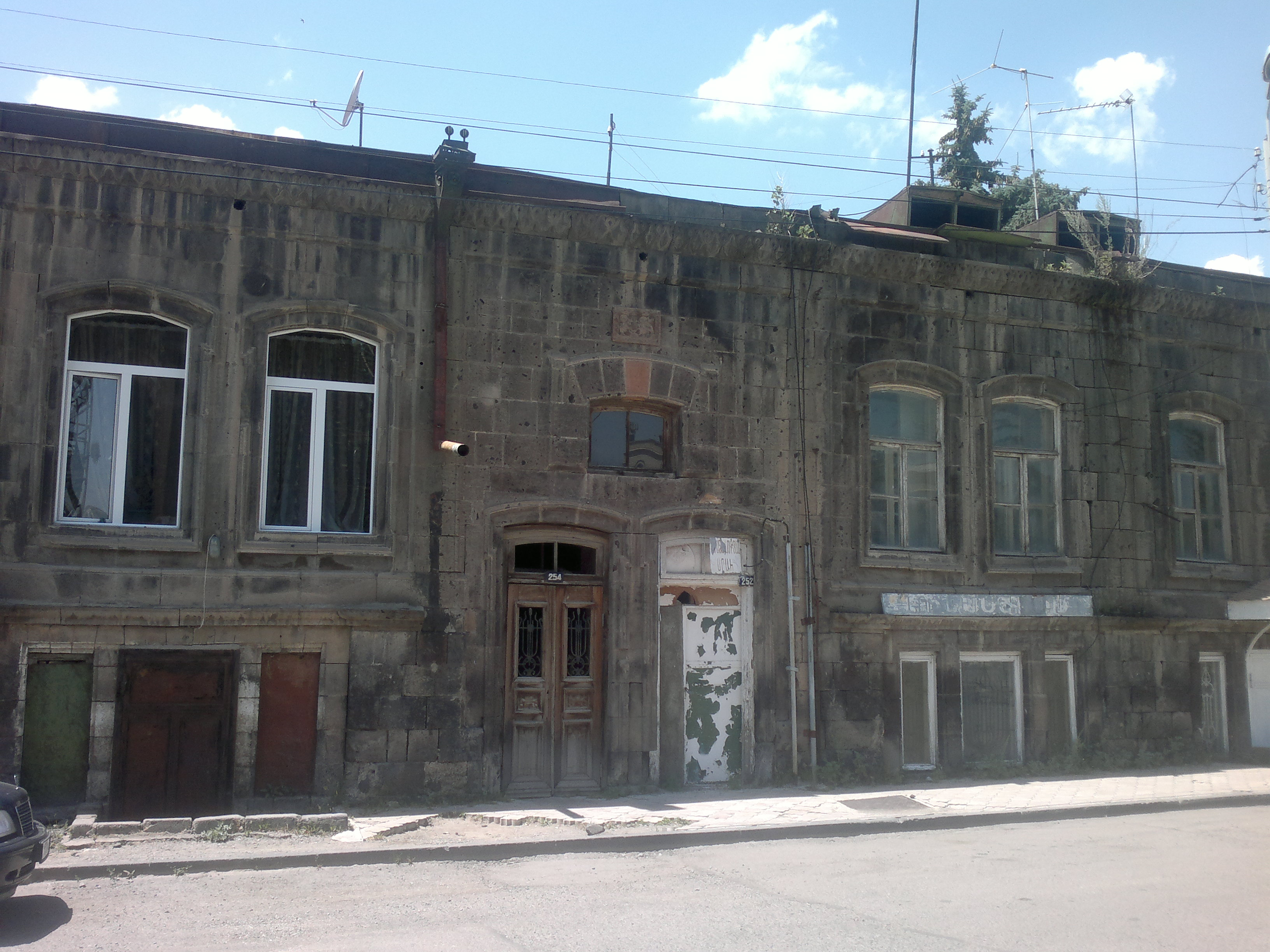

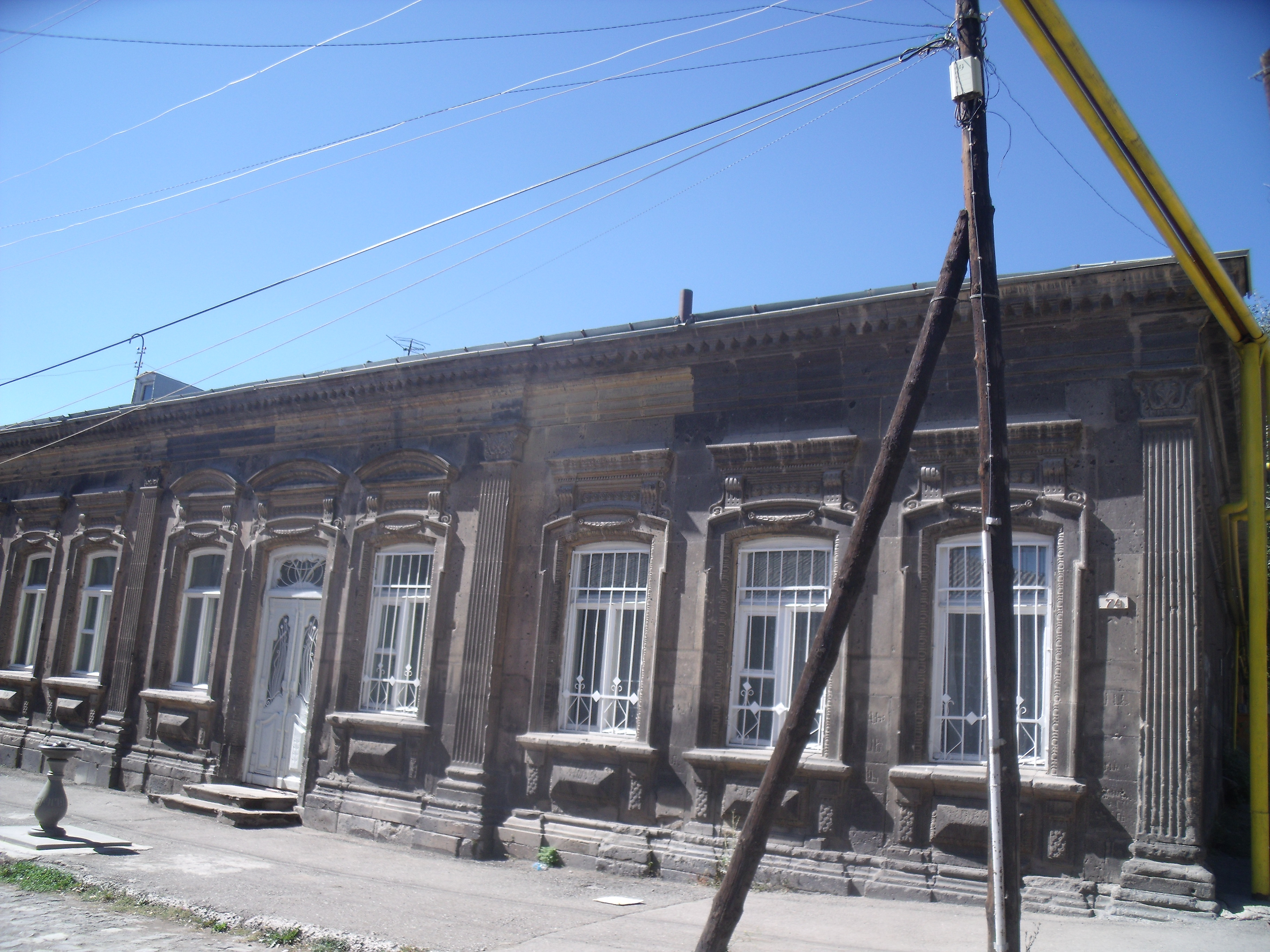

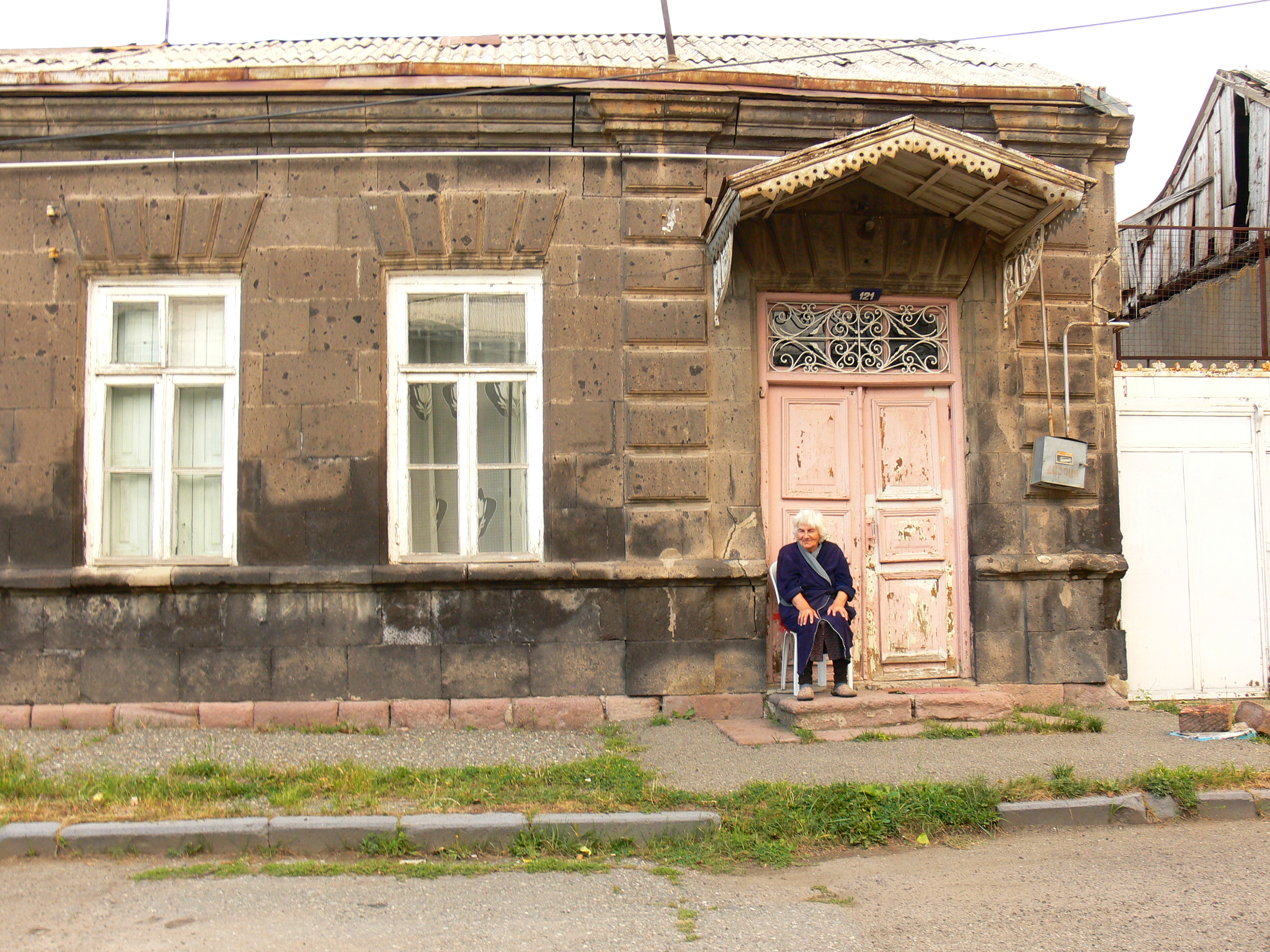

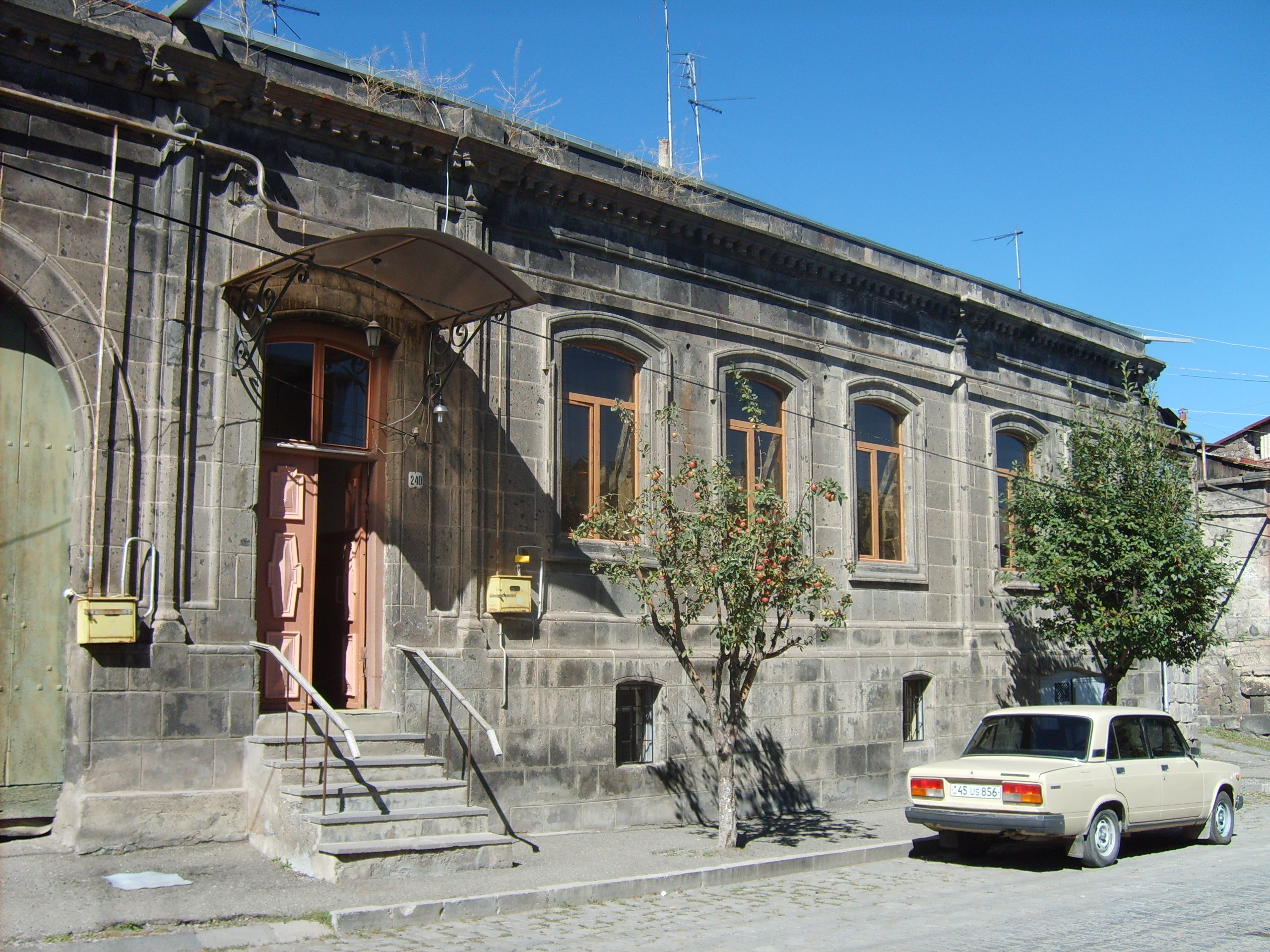

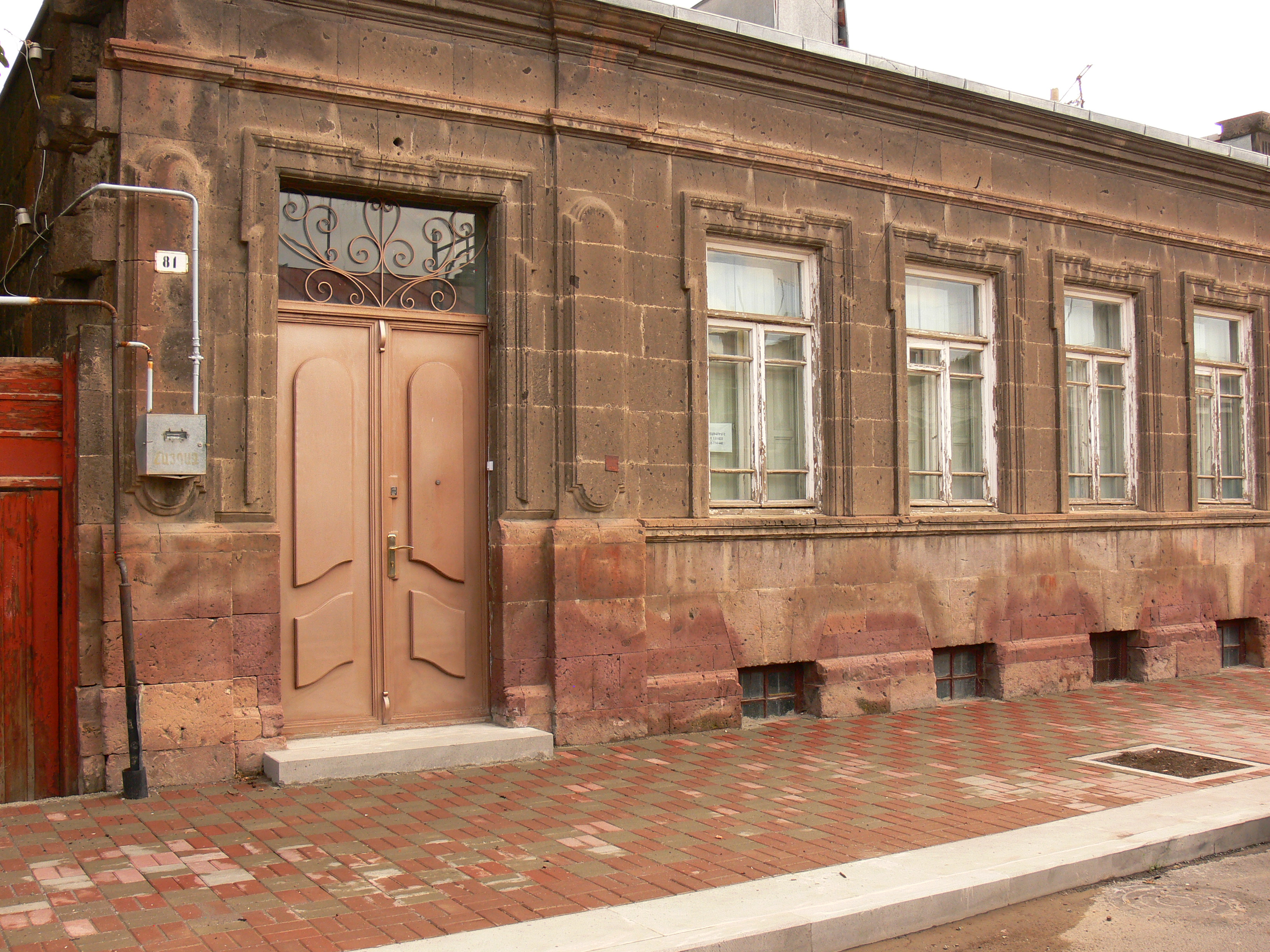

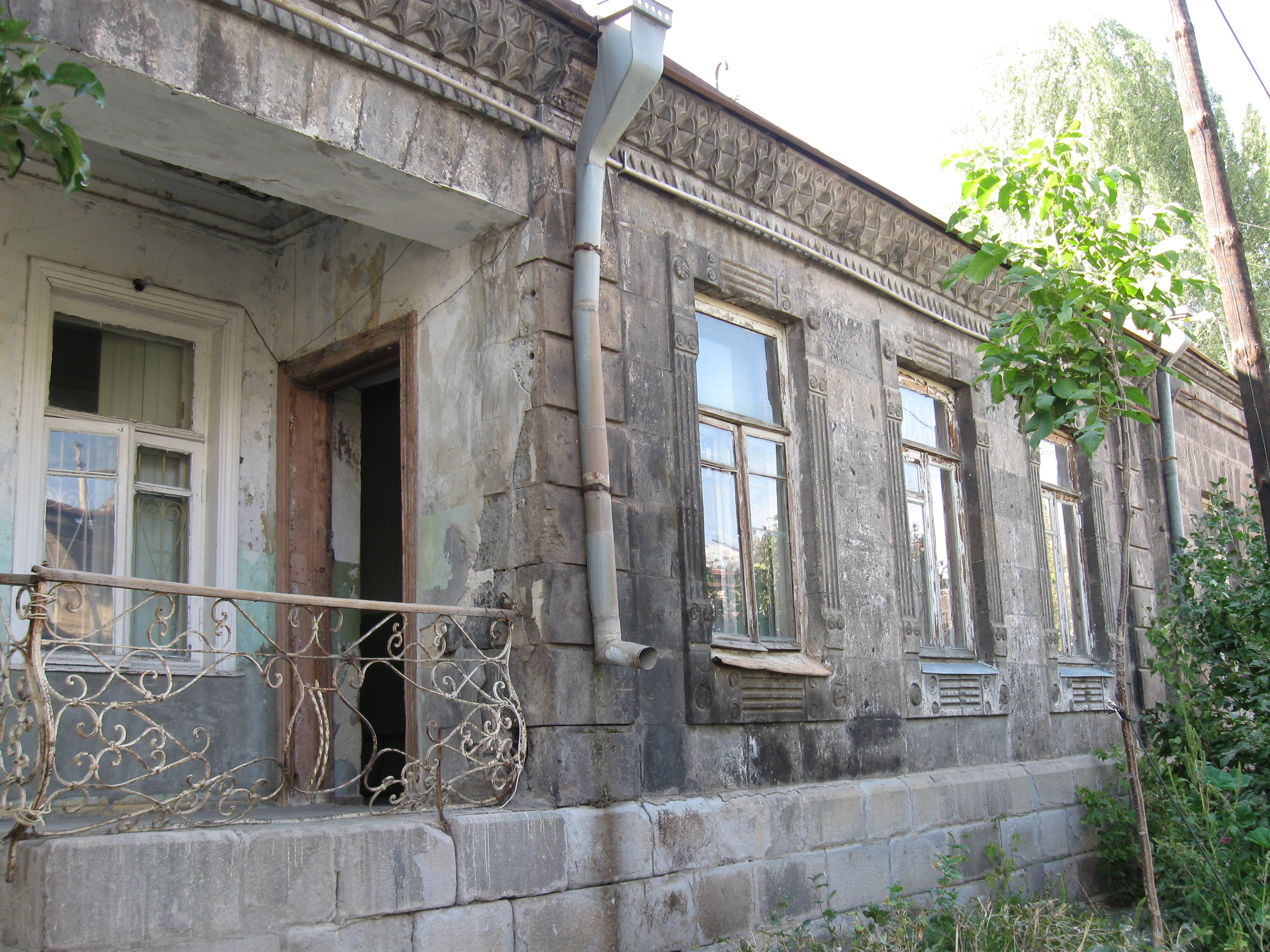

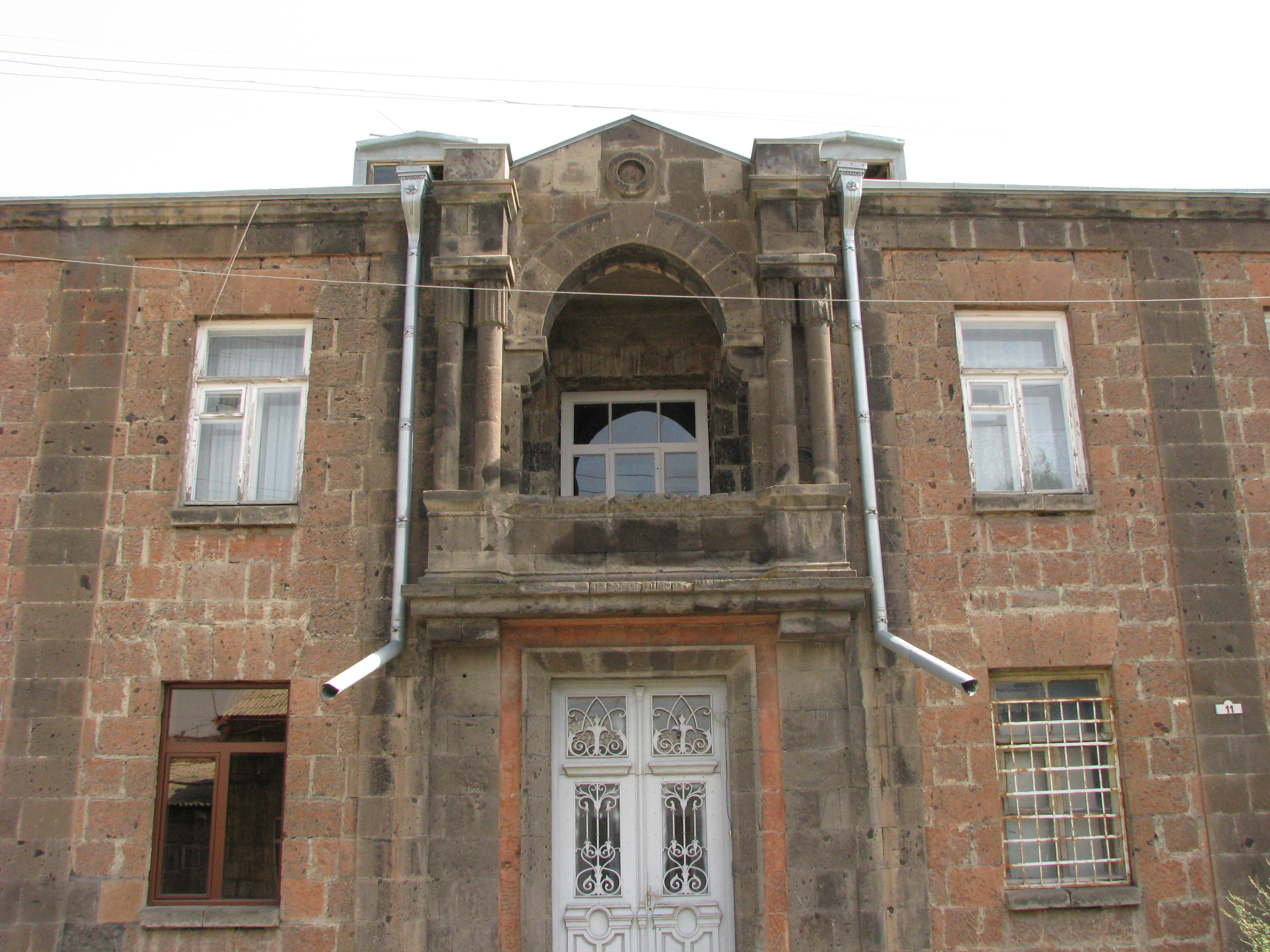

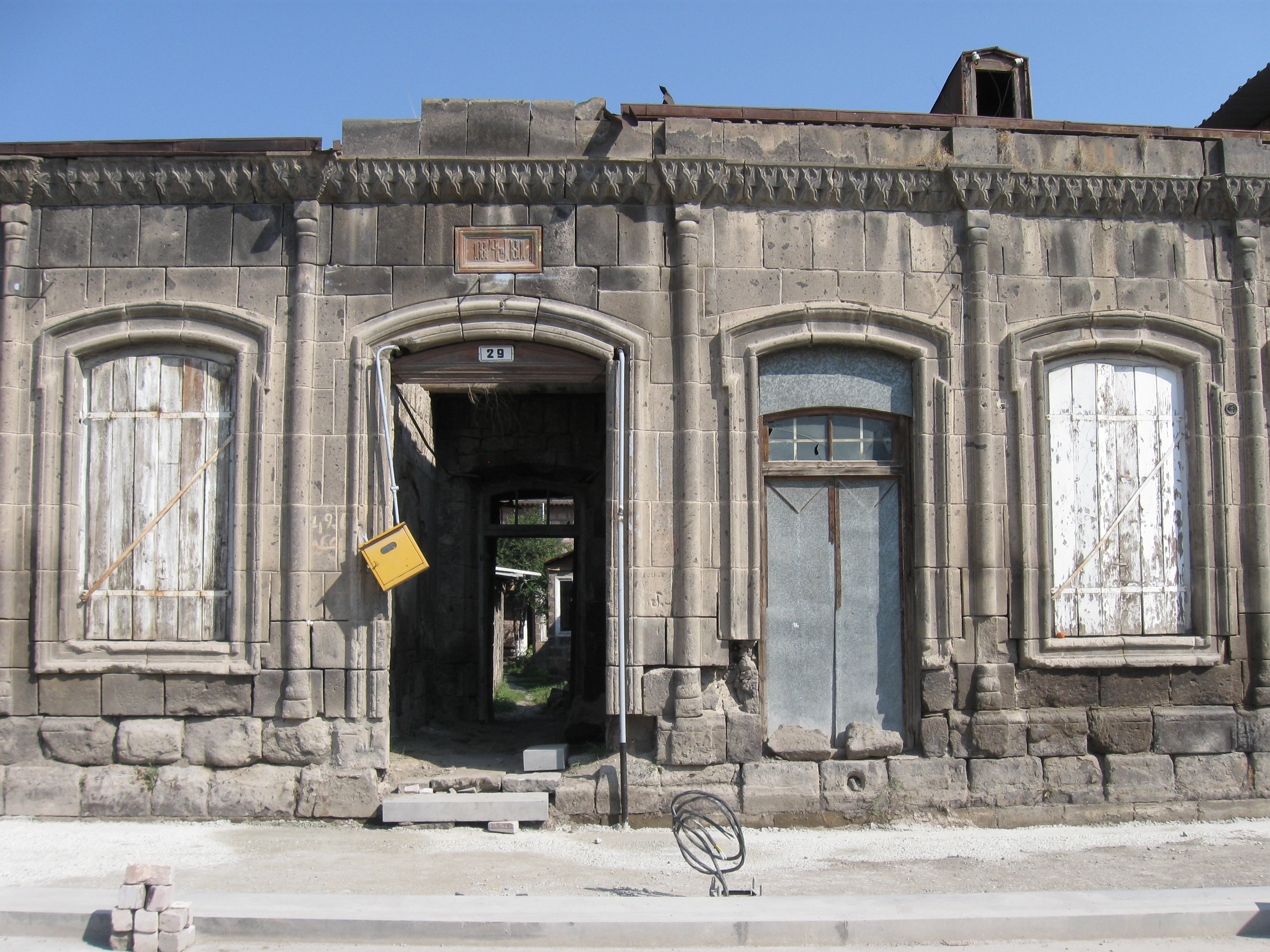

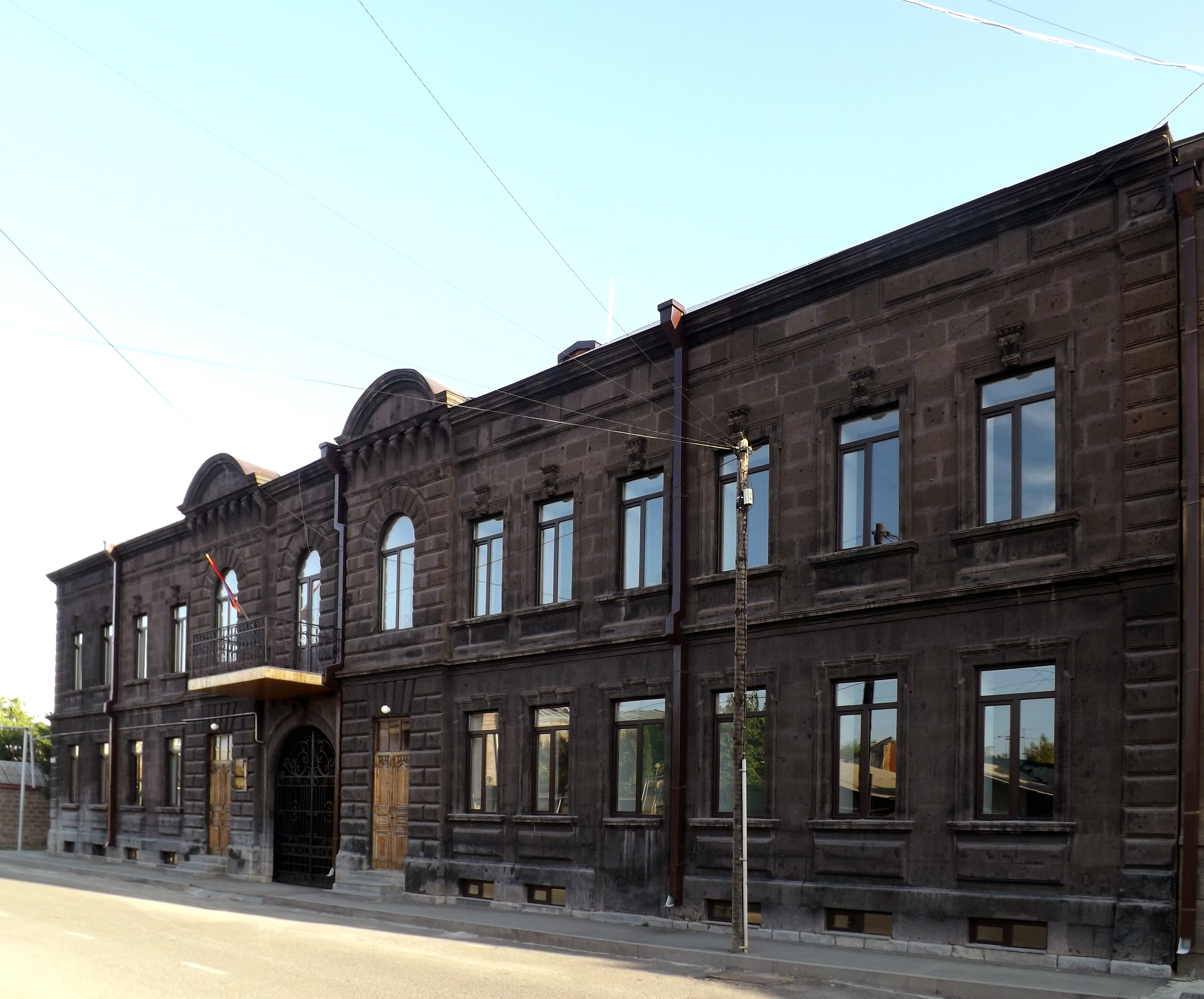

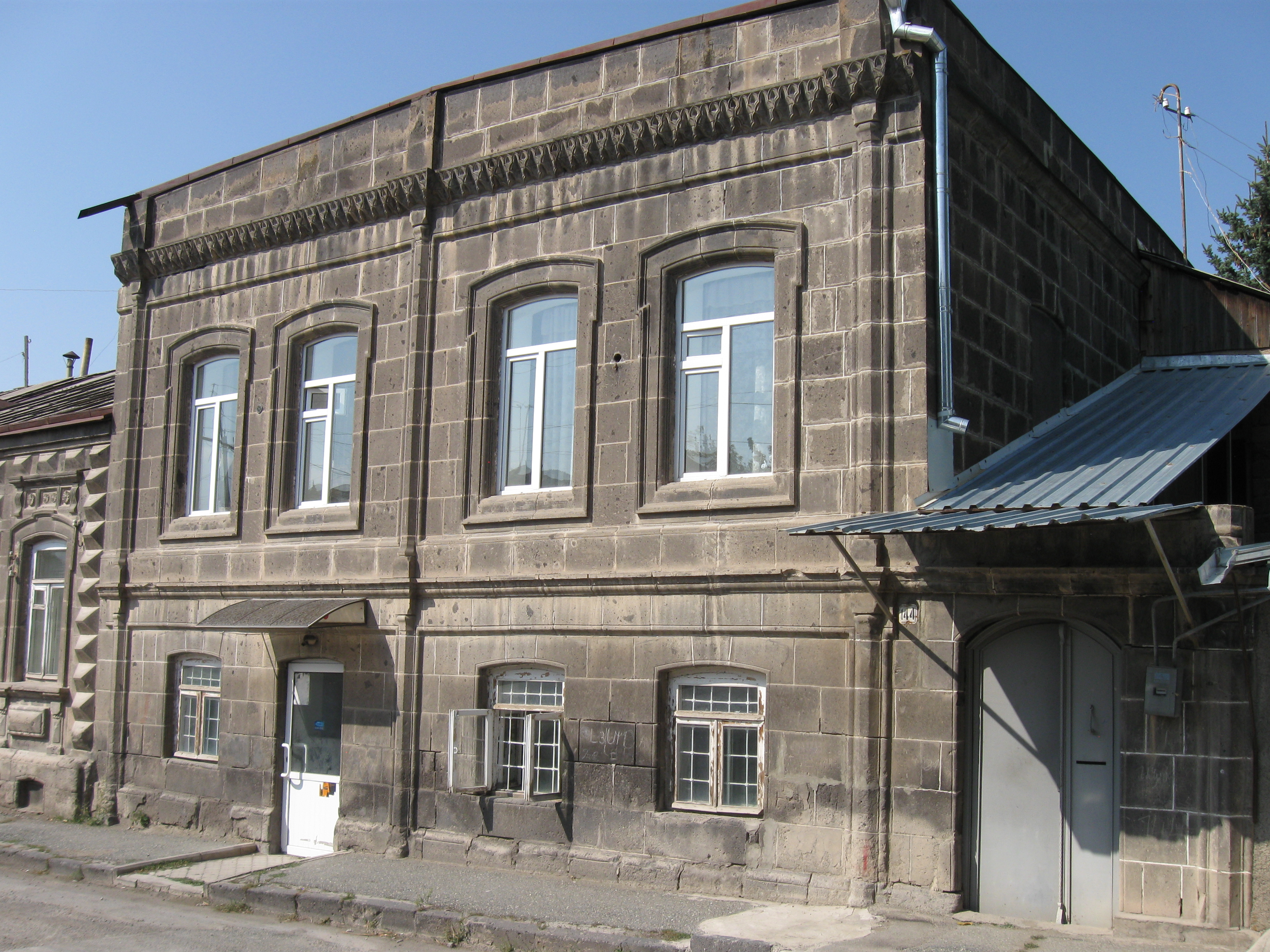

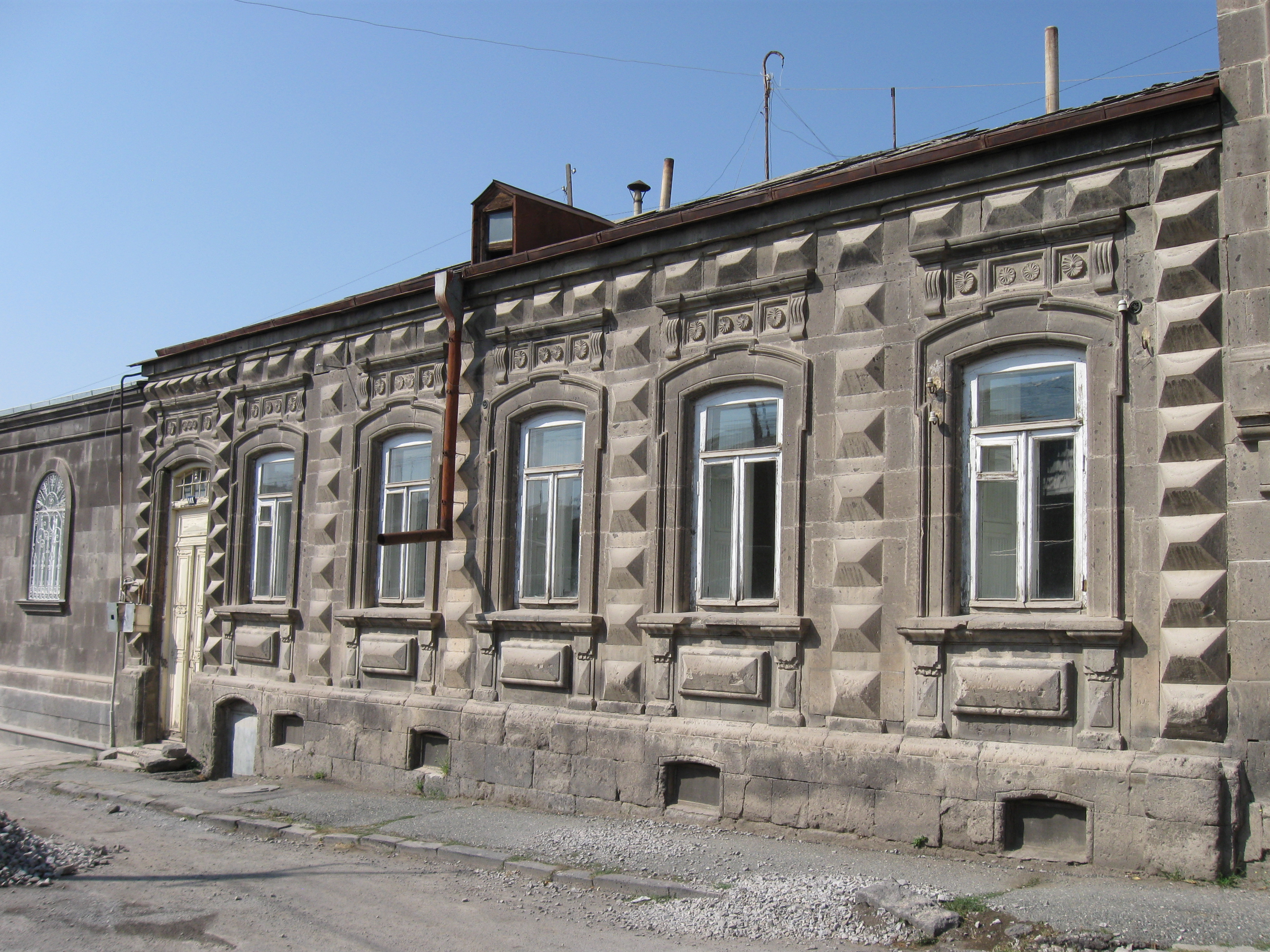

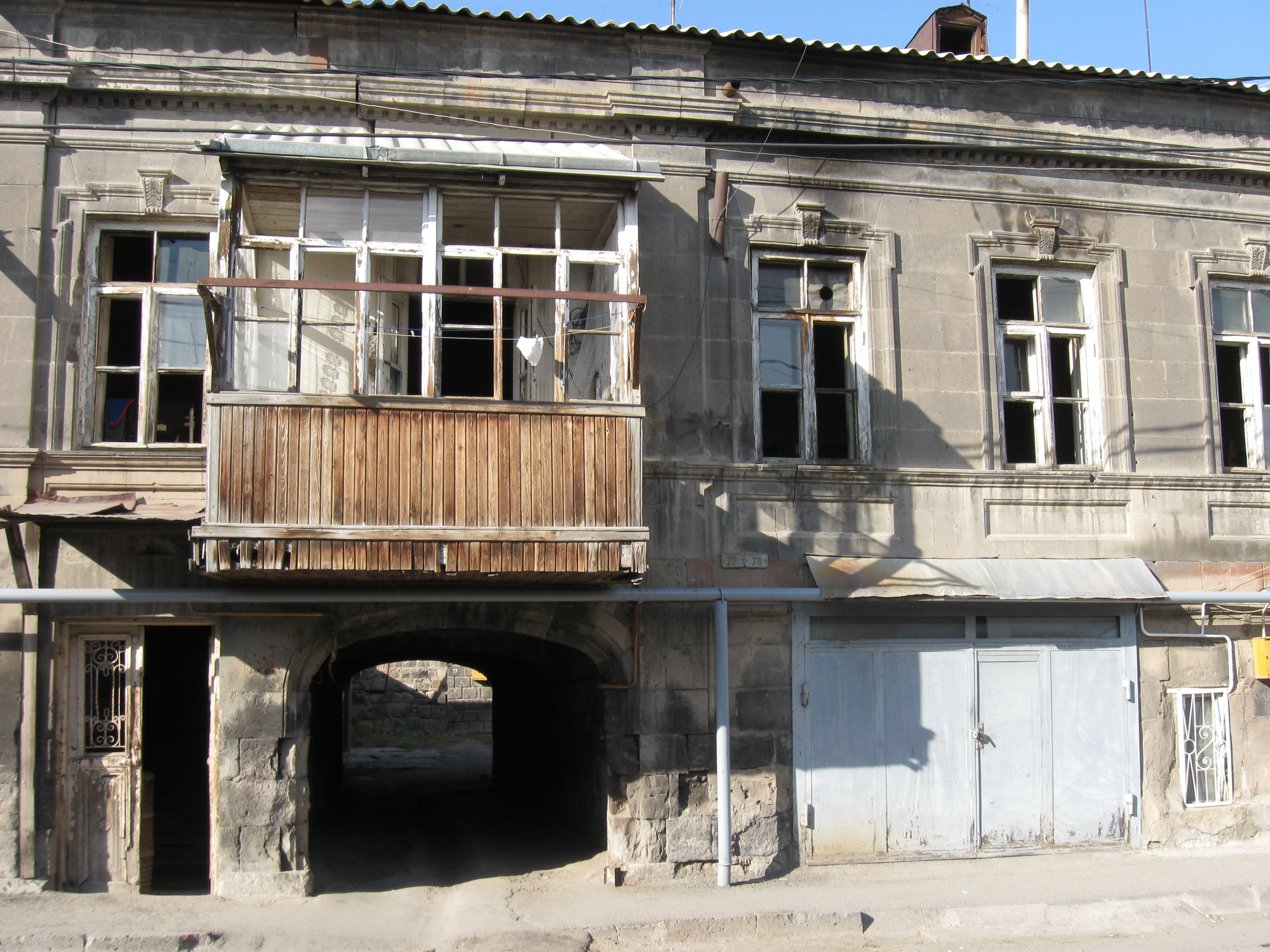

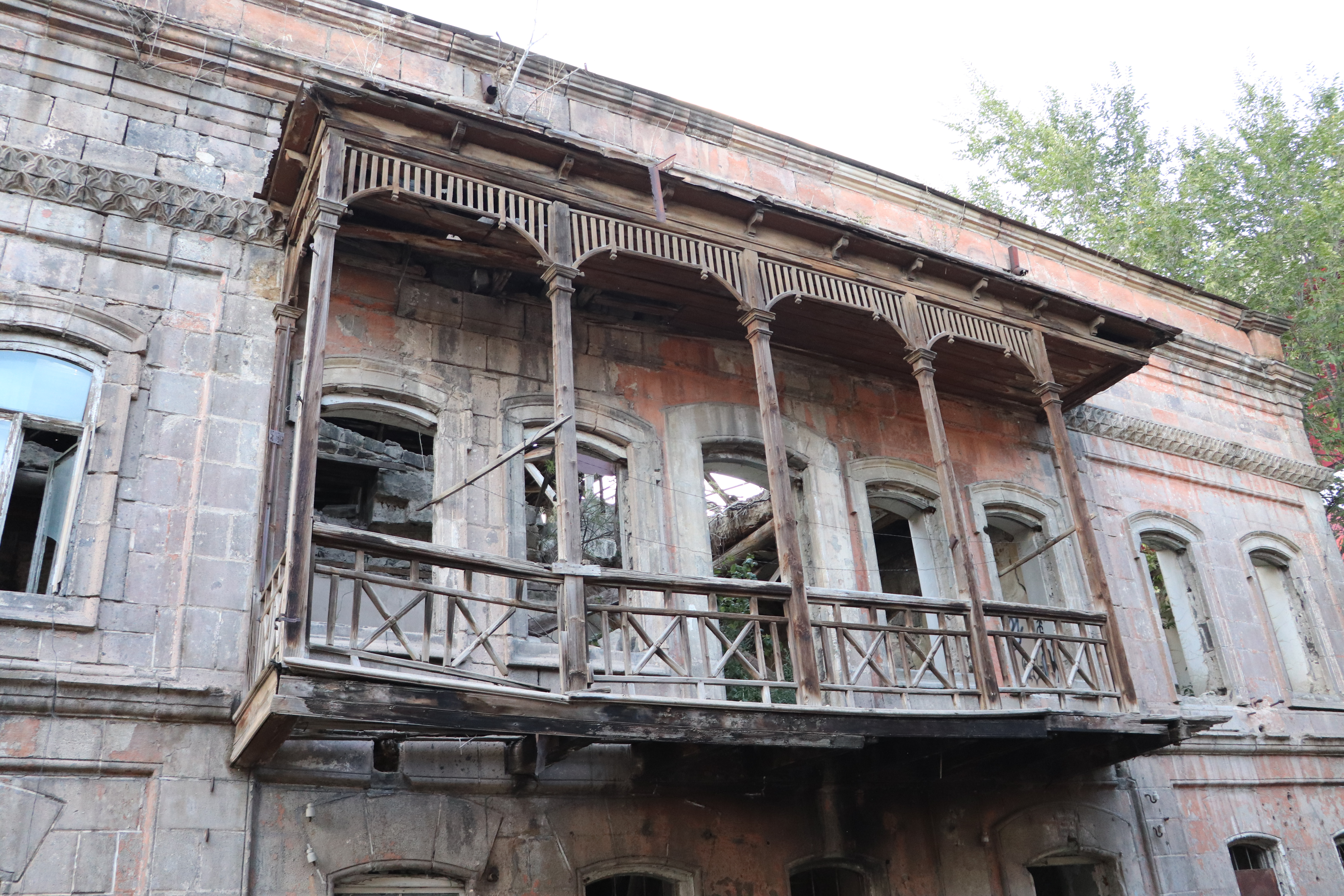

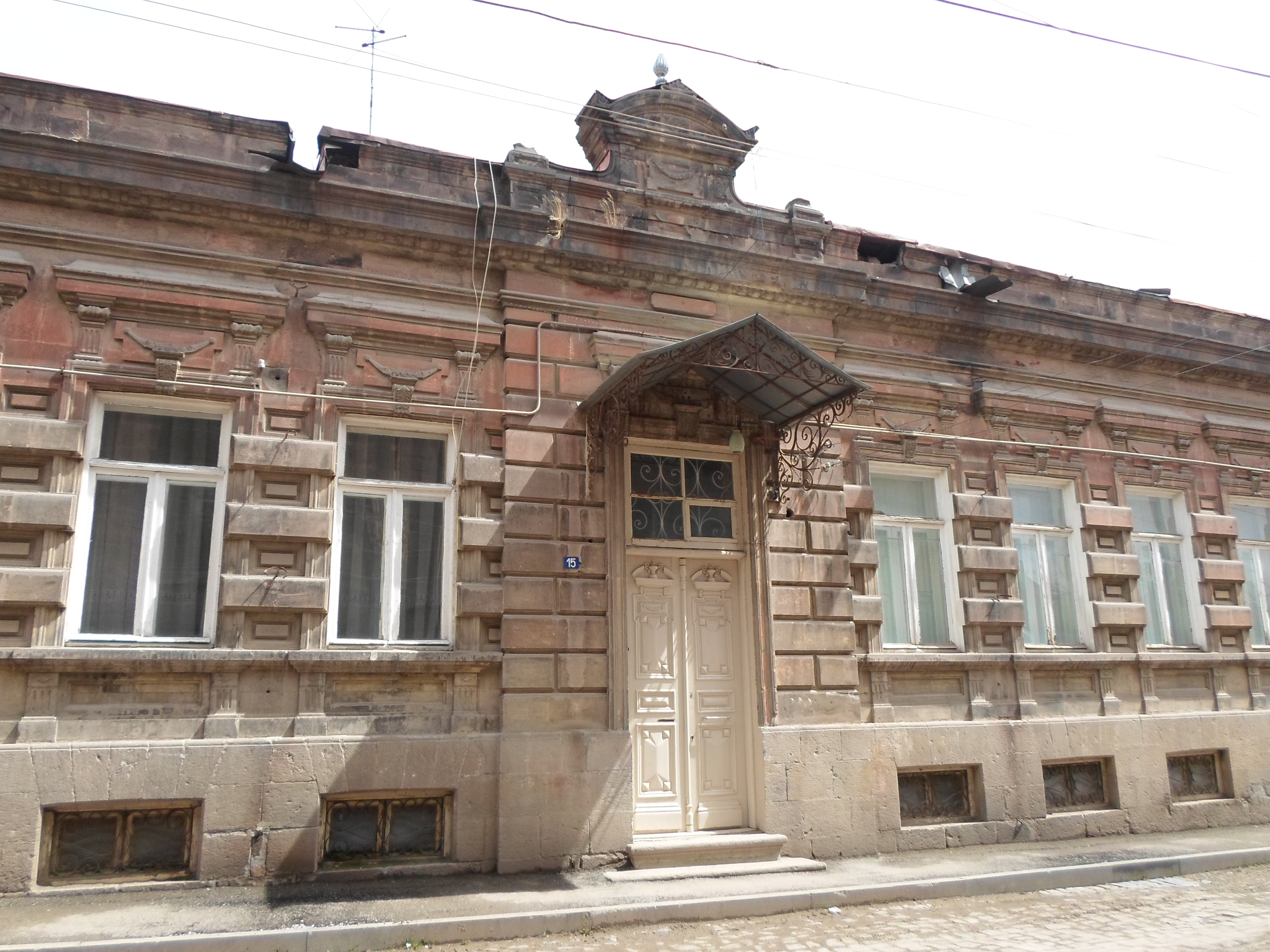

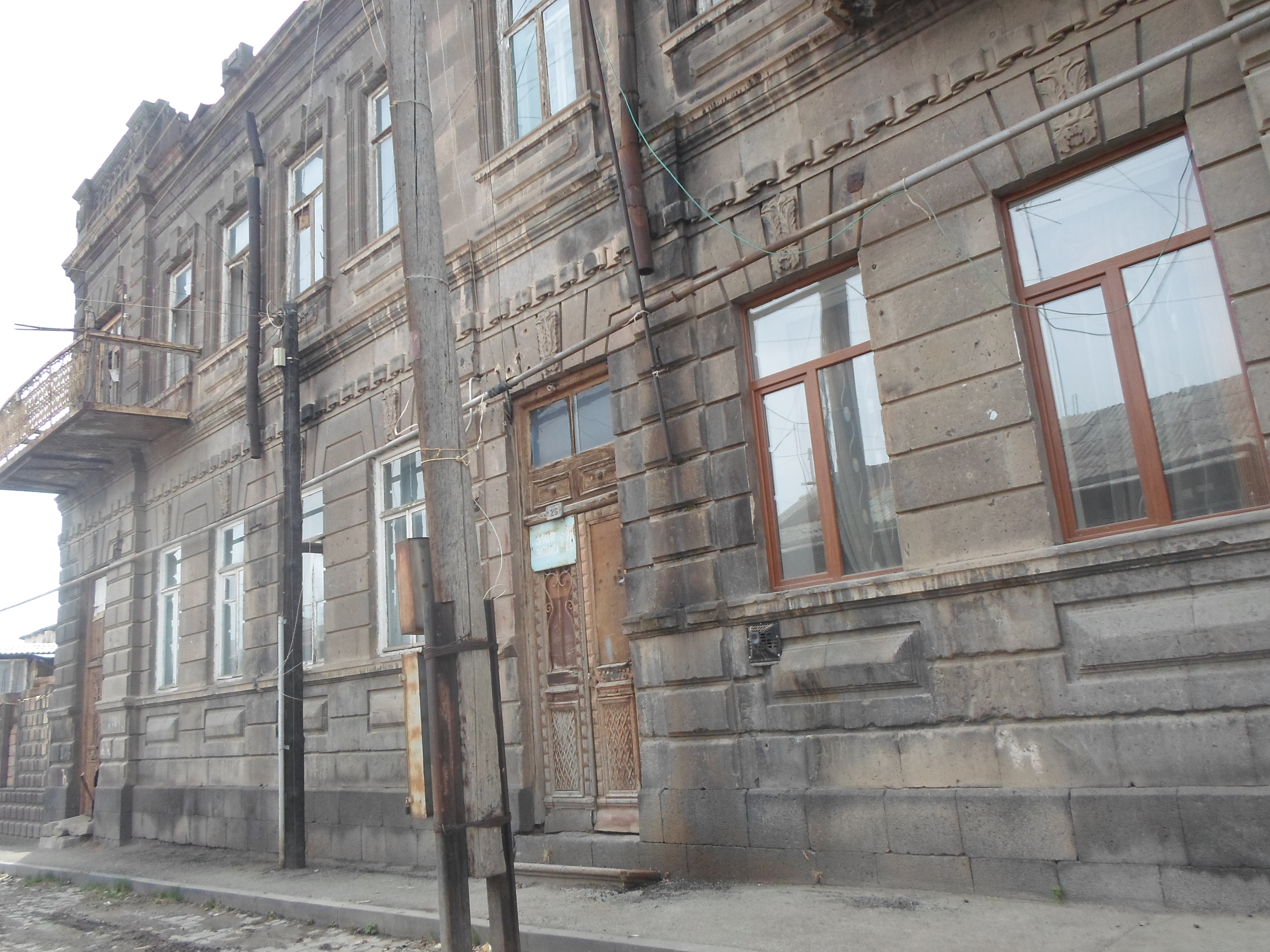

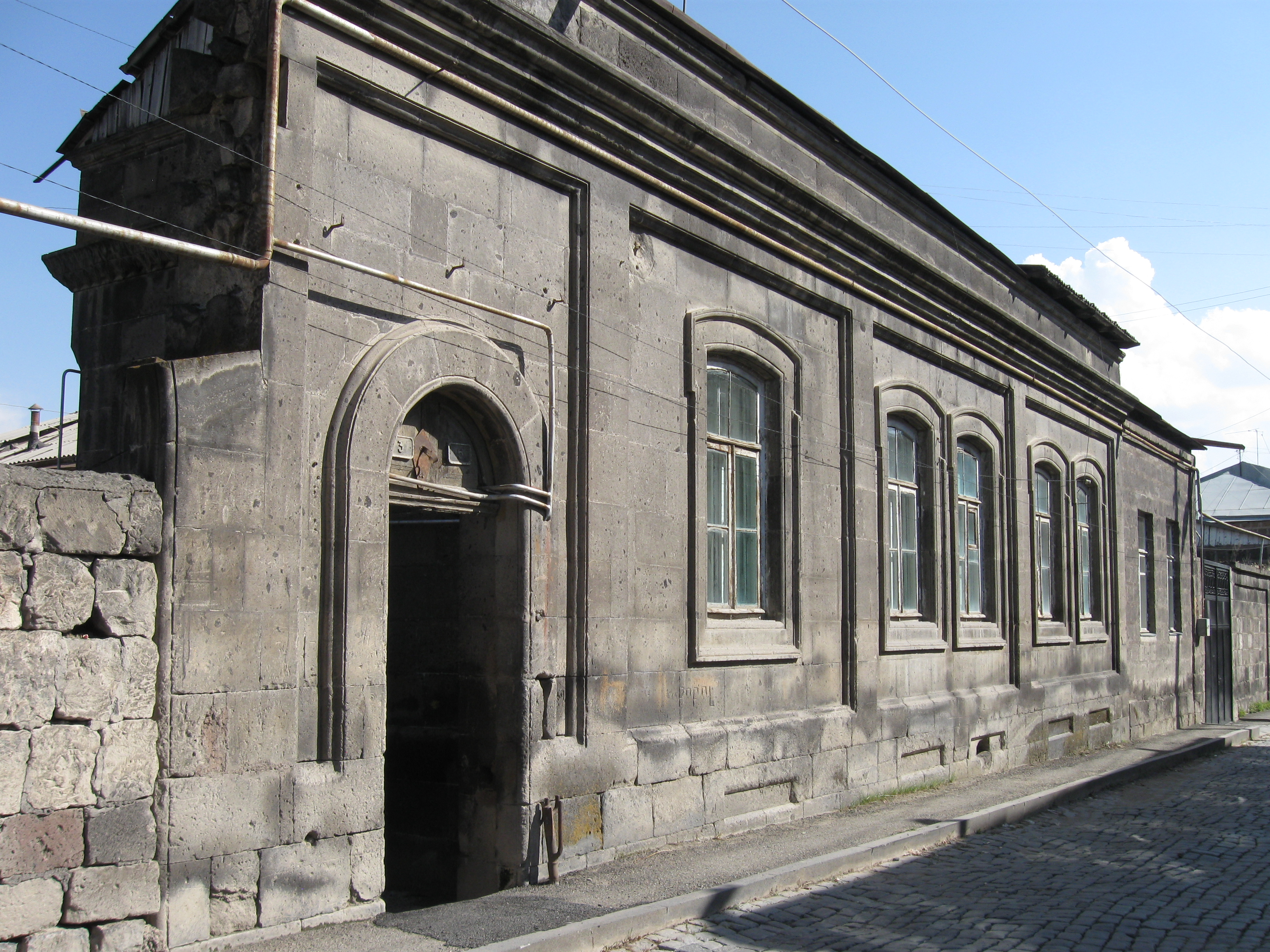

== See also ==
- Kond (old quarter of Yerevan)
- Poqr Tagh (old quarter of Meghri)
