= Kolah Kabud =

Kolah Kabud (Persian: كلاه كبود or كله كبود) may refer to:

- Kolah Kabud, Ilam (كله كبود - Kolah Kabūd)
- Kolah Kabud, Kermanshah (كلاه كبود - Kolāh Kabūd)
- Kolah Kabud-e Olya, Kermanshah Province
- Kolah Kabud-e Sofla, Kermanshah Province
- Kolah Kabud-e Vosta, Kermanshah Province
