= Goruran =

Goruran (Persian: گروران) may refer to:

- Goruran-e Chahar Dang
- Goruran-e Do Dang
- Goruran-e Olya
- Goruran-e Sofla
