= Vozmaleh =

Vozmaleh or Vezmeleh or Vezmaleh (Persian: وزمله) may refer to:

- Vozmaleh, Miyan Darband, Kermanshah Province
- Vozmaleh, Poshtdarband, Kermanshah Province
- Vezmeleh, Baneh, Kurdistan Province
- Vezmeleh, Saqqez, Kurdistan Province
