= Razian =

Razian or Raziyan (Persian: رازيان) may refer to:

- Razian, East Azerbaijan
- Razian-e Kari, Fars Province
- Razin, Kermanshah
- Raziyan, Kermanshah
- Razian, Zanjan
