= Kam Shur =

Kam Shur كمشور
- Village
- Location within Iran
- Coordinates: 34°43′33″N 47°06′31″E
- Country: Iran
- Province: Kermanshah
- County: Kermanshah
- Bakhsh: Central
- Rural District: Poshtdarband

Population (2006)
  - Total: 354
- Time zone: UTC+3:30 (IRST)
  - Summer (DST): UTC+4:30 (IRDT)

Kam Shur (Persian: كمشور, also Romanized as Kam Shūr) is a village in Poshtdarband Rural District, in the Central District of Kermanshah County, Kermanshah Province, Iran. At the 2006 census, its population was 354, in 93 families.
