= Dowlatyar =

Dowlatyar دولتيار
- Village
- Location within Iran
- Coordinates: 34°42′54″N 46°59′43″E
- Country: Iran
- Province: Kermanshah
- County: Kermanshah
- Bakhsh: Central
- Rural District: Razavar

Population (2006)
  - Total: 255
- Time zone: UTC+3:30 (IRST)
  - Summer (DST): UTC+4:30 (IRDT)

Dowlatyar (Persian: دولتيار, also Romanized as Dowlatyār) is a village in Razavar Rural District, in the Central District of Kermanshah County, Kermanshah Province, Iran. At the 2006 census, its population was 255, in 65 families.
