= Hanyandar =

Hanyandar هنياندر
- Village
- Location within Iran
- Coordinates: 34°46′44″N 47°04′05″E
- Country: Iran
- Province: Kermanshah
- County: Kermanshah
- Bakhsh: Central
- Rural District: Poshtdarband

Population (2006)
  - Total: 111
- Time zone: UTC+3:30 (IRST)
  - Summer (DST): UTC+4:30 (IRDT)

Hanyandar (Persian: هنياندر, also Romanized as Hanyāndar; also known as Handyāndar) is a village in Poshtdarband Rural District, in the Central District of Kermanshah County, Kermanshah Province, Iran. At the 2006 census, its population was 111, in 22 families.
