= Malek Tappeh =

Malek Tappeh ملك تپه
- Village
- Location within Iran
- Coordinates: 34°33′01″N 46°51′59″E
- Country: Iran
- Province: Kermanshah
- County: Kermanshah
- Bakhsh: Central
- Rural District: Miyan Darband

Population (2006)
  - Total: 54
- Time zone: UTC+3:30 (IRST)
  - Summer (DST): UTC+4:30 (IRDT)

Malek Tappeh (Persian: ملك تپه, also Romanized as Malek Tappeh; also known as Malik Tappeh and Malik Tepe) is a village in Miyan Darband Rural District, in the Central District of Kermanshah County, Kermanshah Province, Iran.

== Population ==
At the 2006 census, its population was 54, in 17 families.

== Ancient Artifacts ==
A number of artifacts have been found in Malek Tappeh dating back to the 12,000 BC. These include bull-shaped jugs, ram-shaped jugs, and more.
