= Rezlansar =

Rezlansar رزلانسر
- Village
- Location within Iran
- Coordinates: 34°40′39″N 47°04′59″E
- Country: Iran
- Province: Kermanshah
- County: Kermanshah
- Bakhsh: Central
- Rural District: Poshtdarband

Population (2006)
  - Total: 217
- Time zone: UTC+3:30 (IRST)
  - Summer (DST): UTC+4:30 (IRDT)

Rezlansar (Persian: رزلانسر, also Romanized as Rezlānsar) is a village in Poshtdarband Rural District, in the Central District of Kermanshah County, Kermanshah Province, Iran. At the 2006 census, its population was 217, in 52 families.
