= Qarah Hasan =

Qarah Hasan قره‌حسن
- Village
- Location within Iran
- Coordinates: 34°39′50″N 47°06′26″E
- Country: Iran
- Province: Kermanshah
- County: Kermanshah
- Bakhsh: Central
- Rural District: Poshtdarband

Population (2006)
  - Total: 326
- Time zone: UTC+3:30 (IRST)
  - Summer (DST): UTC+4:30 (IRDT)

Qarah Hasan (Persian: قره‌حسن, also Romanized as Qarah Ḩasan) is a village in Poshtdarband Rural District, in the Central District of Kermanshah County, Kermanshah Province, Iran. At the 2006 census, its population was 326, in 72 families.
