= Gowhar Chaqa =

Gowhar Chaqa گوهرچقا
- Village
- Location within Iran
- Coordinates: 34°33′19″N 46°58′03″E
- Country: Iran
- Province: Kermanshah
- County: Kermanshah
- Bakhsh: Central
- Rural District: Miyan Darband

Population (2006)
  - Total: 270
- Time zone: UTC+3:30 (IRST)
  - Summer (DST): UTC+4:30 (IRDT)

Gowhar Chaqa (Persian: گوهرچقا, also Romanized as Gowhar Chaqā, Gowhar Cheqā, and Gowhar Choqā; also known as Gawān Chia, Gowhad Cheqā, Gowhar Cheghā, and Gūn Chīā) is a village in Miyan Darband Rural District, in the Central District of Kermanshah County, Kermanshah Province, Iran. At the 2006 census, its population was 270, in 61 families.
