= Hurtekah =

Hurtekah هورتكه
- Village
- Location within Iran
- Coordinates: 34°43′04″N 47°07′56″E
- Country: Iran
- Province: Kermanshah
- County: Kermanshah
- Bakhsh: Central
- Rural District: Poshtdarband

Population (2006)
  - Total: 239
- Time zone: UTC+3:30 (IRST)
  - Summer (DST): UTC+4:30 (IRDT)

Hurtekah (Persian: هورتكه, also Romanized as Hūrtekah; also known as Hartekah) is a village in Poshtdarband Rural District, in the Central District of Kermanshah County, Kermanshah Province, Iran. At the 2006 census, its population was 239, comprising 55 families.
