= Kamareh Gareh =

Kamareh Gareh كمره گره
- Village
- Location within Iran
- Coordinates: 34°43′15″N 46°55′34″E
- Country: Iran
- Province: Kermanshah
- County: Kermanshah
- Bakhsh: Central
- Rural District: Razavar

Population (2006)
  - Total: 703
- Time zone: UTC+3:30 (IRST)
  - Summer (DST): UTC+4:30 (IRDT)

Kamareh Gareh (Persian: كمره گره) is a village in Razavar Rural District, in the Central District of Kermanshah County, Kermanshah Province, Iran. At the 2006 census, its population was 703, in 165 families.
