= Pa Emam =

Pa Emam پاامام
- Village
- Location within Iran
- Coordinates: 34°39′19″N 46°52′44″E
- Country: Iran
- Province: Kermanshah
- County: Kermanshah
- Bakhsh: Central
- Rural District: Miyan Darband

Population (2006)
  - Total: 32
- Time zone: UTC+3:30 (IRST)
  - Summer (DST): UTC+4:30 (IRDT)

Pa Emam (Persian: پاامام, also Romanized as Pā Emām) is a village in Miyan Darband Rural District, in the Central District of Kermanshah County, Kermanshah Province, Iran. At the 2006 census, its population was 32, in 8 families.
