= Qalvaz =

Qalvaz قلوز
- Village
- Location within Iran
- Coordinates: 34°42′26″N 47°00′14″E
- Country: Iran
- Province: Kermanshah
- County: Kermanshah
- Bakhsh: Central
- Rural District: Razavar

Population (2006)
  - Total: 145
- Time zone: UTC+3:30 (IRST)
  - Summer (DST): UTC+4:30 (IRDT)

Qalvaz (Persian: قلوز; also known as Qalvaz-e Soflá) is a village in Razavar Rural District, in the Central District of Kermanshah County, Kermanshah Province, Iran. At the 2006 census, its population was 145, in 33 families.
