= Sarzamelah =

Village in Kermanshah, Iran

Sarzamelah سرزامله
- Village
- Location within Iran
- Coordinates: 34°36′40″N 47°09′18″E
- Country: Iran
- Province: Kermanshah
- County: Kermanshah
- Bakhsh: Central
- Rural District: Poshtdarband

Population (2006)
  - Total: 41
- Time zone: UTC+3:30 (IRST)
  - Summer (DST): UTC+4:30 (IRDT)

Sarzamelah (Persian: سرزامله, also Romanized as Sarzāmelah and Sar Zāmleh) is a village in Poshtdarband Rural District, in the Central District of Kermanshah County, Kermanshah Province, Iran. At the 2006 census, its population was 41, in 11 families.
