= Zamelah =

Zamelah زامله
- Village
- Location within Iran
- Coordinates: 34°37′00″N 47°08′38″E
- Country: Iran
- Province: Kermanshah
- County: Kermanshah
- Bakhsh: Central
- Rural District: Poshtdarband

Population (2006)
  - Total: 382
- Time zone: UTC+3:30 (IRST)
  - Summer (DST): UTC+4:30 (IRDT)

Zamelah (Persian: زامله, also Romanized as Zāmelah) is a village in Poshtdarband Rural District, in the Central District of Kermanshah County, Kermanshah Province, Iran. At the 2006 census, its population was 382, in 75 families.
