= Marzbani =

Village in Kermanshah province, Iran

Marzbani Persian: مرزباني
- Village
- Location within Iran
- Coordinates: 34°42′45″N 47°04′38″E
- Country: Iran
- Province: Kermanshah
- County: Kermanshah
- District: Bilavar
- Rural District: Posht Darband

Population (2016)
  - Total: 432
- Time zone: UTC+3:30 (IRST)

Marzbani (Persian: مرزباني) (Note: Also romanized as Marzabānī, Marzbānī, and Marzebānī; also known as Marzyānī) is a village in, and the capital of, Posht Darband Rural District of Bilavar District, Kermanshah County, Kermanshah province, Iran.

== Demographics ==
=== Population ===
At the time of the 2006 National Census, the village's population was 568 in 144 households, when it was in the Central District). The following census in 2011 counted 607 people in 178 households, by which time the rural district had been separated from the district in the formation of Bilavar District. The 2016 census measured the population of the village as 432 people in 136 households.
