= Cheshmeh-ye Bagh =

Cheshmeh-ye Bagh چشمه باغ
- Village
- Location within Iran
- Coordinates: 34°26′41″N 47°03′32″E
- Country: Iran
- Province: Kermanshah
- County: Kermanshah
- Bakhsh: Central
- Rural District: Miyan Darband

Population (2006)
  - Total: 280
- Time zone: UTC+3:30 (IRST)
  - Summer (DST): UTC+4:30 (IRDT)

Cheshmeh-ye Bagh (Persian: چشمه باغ, also Romanized as Cheshmeh-ye Bāgh) is a village in Miyan Darband Rural District, in the Central District of Kermanshah County, Kermanshah Province, Iran. At the 2006 census, its population was 280, in 64 families.
