= Meymun Baz =

Meymun Baz ميمون باز
- Village
- Location within Iran
- Coordinates: 34°30′04″N 46°51′05″E
- Country: Iran
- Province: Kermanshah
- County: Kermanshah
- Bakhsh: Central
- Rural District: Miyan Darband

Population (2006)
  - Total: 51
- Time zone: UTC+3:30 (IRST)
  - Summer (DST): UTC+4:30 (IRDT)

Meymun Baz (Persian: ميمون باز, also Romanized as Meymūn Bāz) is a village in Miyan Darband Rural District, in the Central District of Kermanshah County, Kermanshah Province, Iran. At the 2006 census, its population was 51, in 11 families.
