= Darshademan =

Darshademan دارشادمان
- Village
- Location within Iran
- Coordinates: 34°41′40″N 46°53′04″E
- Country: Iran
- Province: Kermanshah
- County: Kermanshah
- Bakhsh: Central
- Rural District: Razavar

Population (2006)
  - Total: 405
- Time zone: UTC+3:30 (IRST)
  - Summer (DST): UTC+4:30 (IRDT)

Darshademan (Persian: دارشادمان, also Romanized as Dārshādemān; also known as Dārchādmān) is a village in Razavar Rural District, in the Central District of Kermanshah County, Kermanshah Province, Iran. At the 2006 census, its population was 405, in 86 families.
