= Karam Bast =

Karam Bast كرم بست
- Village
- Location within Iran
- Coordinates: 34°41′15″N 47°14′39″E
- Country: Iran
- Province: Kermanshah
- County: Kermanshah
- Bakhsh: Central
- Rural District: Poshtdarband

Population (2006)
  - Total: 638
- Time zone: UTC+3:30 (IRST)
  - Summer (DST): UTC+4:30 (IRDT)

Karam Bast (Persian: كرم بست; also known as Karambās) is a village in Poshtdarband Rural District, Central District, Kermanshah County, Kermanshah Province, Iran. At the 2006 census, its population was 638, in 166 families.
