= Gakiyeh =

Gakiyeh or Gakeyeh (Persian: گاكيه), also rendered as Gakia, may refer to:

- Gakiyeh, Dorudfaraman
- Gakiyeh, Miyan Darband
