= Koruran =

Koruran (Persian: كروران) may refer to:

- Koruran Olya
- Koruran-e Sofla
