= Kalian-e Olya =

Kalian-e Olya كاليان عليا
- Village
- Location within Iran
- Coordinates: 34°37′48″N 47°06′52″E
- Country: Iran
- Province: Kermanshah
- County: Kermanshah
- Bakhsh: Central
- Rural District: Poshtdarband

Population (2006)
  - Total: 210
- Time zone: UTC+3:30 (IRST)
  - Summer (DST): UTC+4:30 (IRDT)

Kalian-e Olya (Persian: كاليان عليا, also Romanized as Kālīān-e ‘Olyā, and Kālyān-e ‘Olyā; also known as Kāleyān-e Bālā, Kālīān, Kāliān Bālā, and Kālīān-e Bālā) is a village in Poshtdarband Rural District, in the Central District of Kermanshah County, Kermanshah Province, Iran. At the 2006 census, its population was 210, in 41 families.
