= Raziyan, Kermanshah =

Raziyan رازيان
- Village
- Location within Iran
- Coordinates: 34°42′16″N 46°58′51″E
- Country: Iran
- Province: Kermanshah
- County: Kermanshah
- Bakhsh: Central
- Rural District: Razavar

Population (2006)
  - Total: 730
- Time zone: UTC+3:30 (IRST)
  - Summer (DST): UTC+4:30 (IRDT)

Raziyan (Persian: رازيان, also Romanized as Rāzīyān) is a village in Razavar Rural District, in the Central District of Kermanshah County, Kermanshah Province, Iran. At the 2006 census, its population was 730, in 162 families.
