= Vozmaleh, Poshtdarband =

Vozmaleh وزمله
- Village
- Location within Iran
- Coordinates: 34°36′47″N 47°06′19″E
- Country: Iran
- Province: Kermanshah
- County: Kermanshah
- Bakhsh: Central
- Rural District: Poshtdarband

Population (2006)
  - Total: 89
- Time zone: UTC+3:30 (IRST)
  - Summer (DST): UTC+4:30 (IRDT)

Vozmaleh (Persian: وزمله) is a village in Poshtdarband Rural District, in the Central District of Kermanshah County, Kermanshah Province, Iran. At the 2006 census, its population was 89, in 19 families.
