= Kalian-e Sofla =

Kalian-e Sofla كاليان سفلي
- Village
- Location within Iran
- Coordinates: 34°38′25″N 47°05′09″E
- Country: Iran
- Province: Kermanshah
- County: Kermanshah
- Bakhsh: Central
- Rural District: Poshtdarband

Population (2006)
  - Total: 120
- Time zone: UTC+3:30 (IRST)
  - Summer (DST): UTC+4:30 (IRDT)

Kalian-e Sofla (Persian: كاليان سفلي, also Romanized as Kālīān-e Soflá; also known as Kālīān-e Pā'īn) is a village in Poshtdarband Rural District, in the Central District of Kermanshah County, Kermanshah Province, Iran. At the 2006 census, its population was 120, in 28 families.
