= Kolah Kabud-e Olya =

Kolah Kabud-e Olya كلاه كبودعليا
- Village
- Location within Iran
- Coordinates: 34°33′16″N 46°50′42″E
- Country: Iran
- Province: Kermanshah
- County: Kermanshah
- Bakhsh: Central
- Rural District: Miyan Darband

Population (2006)
  - Total: 73
- Time zone: UTC+3:30 (IRST)
  - Summer (DST): UTC+4:30 (IRDT)

Kolah Kabud-e Olya (Persian: كلاه كبودعليا, Southern Kurdish: کوڵە کەو بان also Romanized as Kolāh Kabūd-e ‘Olyā; also known as Kalā Kabūd-e Bālā) is a village in Miyan Darband Rural District, in the Central District of Kermanshah County, Kermanshah Province, Iran. At the 2006 census, its population was 73, in 18 families.
