= Kalyani =

Kalyani may refer to:

== Film, television and music ==
- Kalyani (1940 film), a Hindi film
- Kalyani (1952 film), a Tamil film
- Kalyani (1971 film), a Kannada film
- Kalyani (1979 film), a Telugu film
- Kalyani (1983 film), an Oriya Ollywood film
- Kalyani (TV series), an Indian Telugu language soap opera
- KALYANI, a Malayalam song

== Places ==
- Kalyani, Dakshin Dinajpur, West Bengal, India
- Kalyani, Raebareli, a village in Uttar Pradesh, India
- Kalyani, West Bengal, a city in the Nadia district of West Bengal, India
- Kalyani Dam, in Tirupati, Andhra Pradesh, India
- Kalyani Nagar, a neighbourhood in Pune, Maharashtra, India
- Kalyani River, in Barabanki district, Uttar Pradesh, India
- Kalyani subdivision, Nadia district, West Bengal, India
- Ancient name for Basavakalyan, Karnataka, India

== People ==
- Baba Kalyani (born 1949), Indian businessman
- Galyani Vadhana (1923–2008), princess of Thailand
- Shrikant Kalyani (born 1964), Indian cricketer
- Kalyani Bondre (born 1981), academic and Indian classical vocalist
- Kalyani Das (1907–1983), Indian revolutionary and nationalist from Bengal
- Kalyani Dhokarikar (born 1971), Indian cricketer
- Karate Kalyani, Indian character actor and comedian
- Kalyani Marella, Indian Kabaddi player
- Kalyani Menon (born 1951), Indian playback singer
- Kalyani Nair, Indian singer
- Kalyani Priyadarshan, Indian film actress
- Kalyani Roy (born 1967), Indian politician
- Kalyani Varadarajan, composer of Carnatic music
- Kalyani (actress), South Indian actress
- Poornitha (born 1990), South Indian actress also known as Kalyani

== Other uses ==
- Kalyani Chalukya, an Indian dynasty
- Kalyani (goddess), a name of Hindu goddess Parvathi
- Kalyani Group, an Indian industrial conglomerate
- Kalyani (raga), a rāga in the Carnatic music of South India as well as Hindustani music
- Kalyani (well), a temple tank in Hindu temples
- Kalyani (Vidhan Sabha constituency), an assembly constituency in Nadia district, West Bengal
- Kalyani Stadium, a stadium in Kalyani, West Bengal

== See also ==
- Kalyan (disambiguation)
- Battle of Kalyani (disambiguation)
- Temple tank
- Pyinsa Kalayani, queen of emperor Anawrahta and mother of emperor Kyansittha from the Pagan kingdom of Myanmar
