= Surni =

Surni or Sureni or Soorenie (Persian: سورني), also rendered as Surini and Surniyeh, may refer to:

- Surni-ye Olya
- Surni-ye Sofla
