= Bhagipur =

Bhagipur Bhāgīpur
- Village
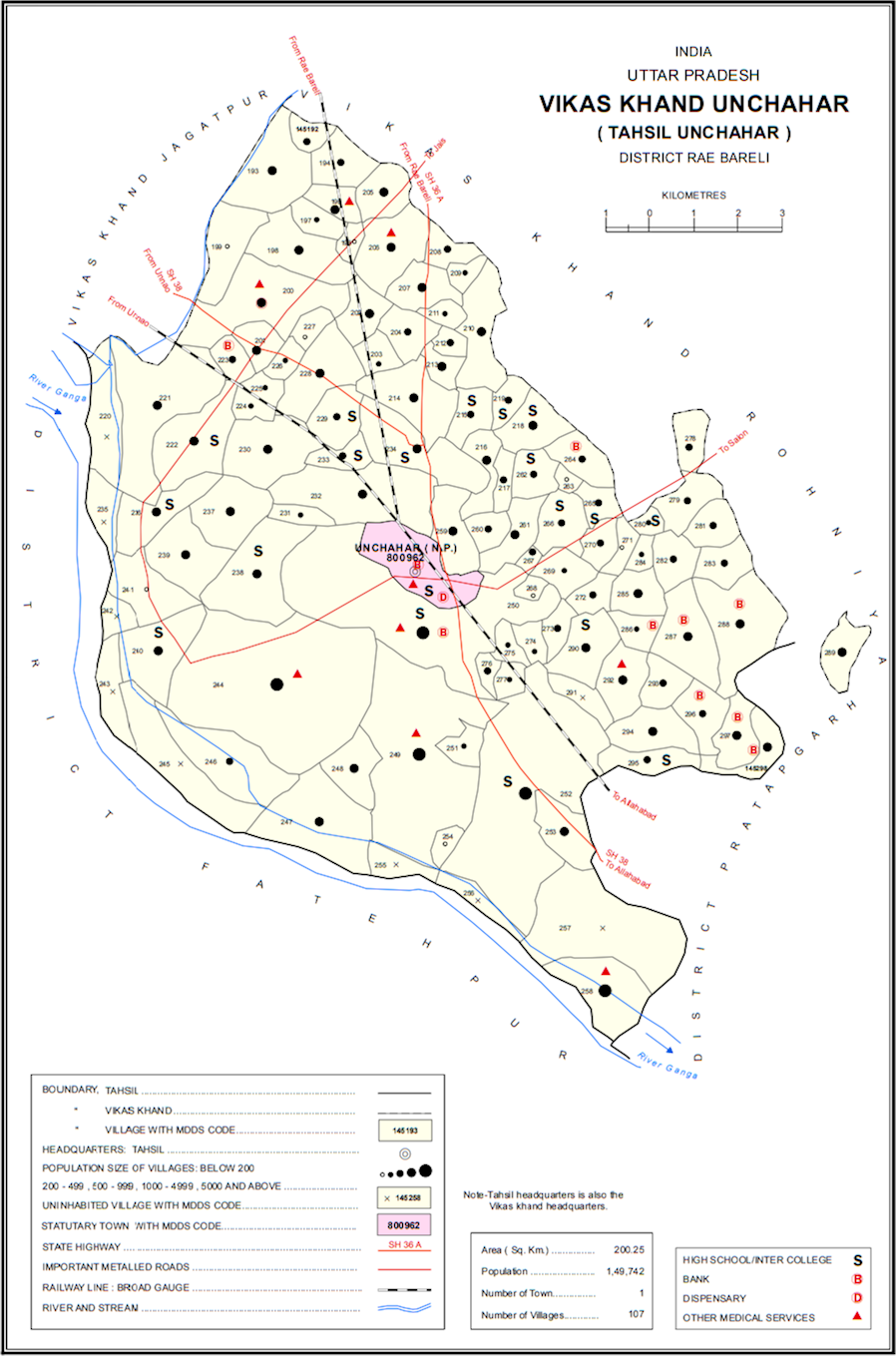
- Map showing Bhagipur (#211) in Unchahar CD block

- Location in Uttar Pradesh, India
- Coordinates: 25.967523°N 81.29456°E
- Country India: India
- State: Uttar Pradesh
- District: Raebareli

Area
  - Total: 0.573 km^{2} (0.221 sq mi)

Population (2011)
  - Total: 446
  - Density: 778/km^{2} (2,020/sq mi)

Languages
  - Official: Hindi
- Time zone: UTC+5:30 (IST)
- Vehicle registration: UP-35

Bhagipur is a village in Unchahar block of Raebareli district, Uttar Pradesh, India. It is located 34 km from Raebareli, the district headquarters. As of 2011, it has a population of 446 people, in 89 households.

The 1961 census recorded Bhagipur as comprising 1 hamlet, with a total population of 246 people (115 male and 131 female), in 49 households and 47 physical houses. The area of the village was given as 126 acres.

The 1981 census recorded Bhagipur as having a population of 300 people, in 62 households, and having an area of 52.20 hectares. The main staple foods were listed as wheat and rice.

Bhagipur village is located in Unchahar Tehsil of Raebareli district in Uttar Pradesh, India. The location code or village code of Bhagipur village is 145211. Unchahar is nearest town to Bhagipur village and nearby villages of Bhagipur:

- Matrauli
- Semri Ranapur
- Newada
- Chaturpur Urf Misrapur
- Khalikpur Kala
- Gopapur
- Manipur Bhatehari
- Sawayaya Hasan
- Sawayaya Mira
- Sawayya Raje
- amalpur Mafi, etc.

Bhagipur is located 1.871 km away from its main town Babu Ganj. Bhagipur is 28.15 km away from its district capital Rae Bareli. It is 104 km away from its state capital Lucknow. Bhagipur's pin code is 229401.

According to Census 2011 information the location code or village code of Bhagipur village is 145211. Bhagipur village is located in Unchahar Tehsil of Rae Bareli district in Uttar Pradesh, India. It is situated 10 km away from sub-district headquarter Unchahar and 30 km away from district headquarter Rae Bareli. As per 2009 stats, Bhagipur village is itself a gram panchayat.

The total geographical area of village is 57.29 hectares. Bhagipur has a total population of 446 peoples. There are about 89 houses in Bhagipur village. Rae Bareli is nearest town to Bhagipur which is approximately 30 km away.

Bhagipur Pin code is 229401 and postal head office is Mustafabad (Raebareli).

Kalikpur Kala (1 km), Prayagpur Nandaura (2 km), Sar Bahda (2 km), Matrauli (2 km), Ishwar Daspur (2 km) are the nearby Villages to Bhagipur. Bhagipur is surrounded by Rohania Block towards East, Jagatpur Block towards North, Deenshah Gaura Block towards west, Salon Block towards East .

Rae Bareli, Jais, Fatehpur, Lal Gopalganj Nindaura are the nearby Cities to Bhagipur.

HOW TO REACH Bhagipur:

By Railway: Ishardaspur Railway Station, Unchahar Junction Rail Way Station are the very nearby railway stations to Bhagipur.

By road: Bhagipur is located 0.571 km away from its main NH highway.

Colleges near Bhagipur: S.N. shiksha Niketan inter college babugaj is located 2 km from bhagipur village .
