= Kalian-e Vosta =

Kalian-e Vosta كاليان وسطي
- Village
- Location within Iran
- Coordinates: 34°38′17″N 47°05′39″E
- Country: Iran
- Province: Kermanshah
- County: Kermanshah
- Bakhsh: Central
- Rural District: Poshtdarband

Population (2006)
  - Total: 391
- Time zone: UTC+3:30 (IRST)
  - Summer (DST): UTC+4:30 (IRDT)

Kalian-e Vosta (Persian: كاليان وسطي, also Romanized as Kālīān-e Vosţá; also known as Kālīān-e Vasaţ) is a village in Poshtdarband Rural District, in the Central District of Kermanshah County, Kermanshah Province, Iran. At the 2006 census, its population was 391, in 88 families.
