= Goruran-e Do Dang =

Goruran-e Do Dang گروران دودانگ
- Village
- Location within Iran
- Coordinates: 34°37′41″N 46°54′14″E
- Country: Iran
- Province: Kermanshah
- County: Kermanshah
- Bakhsh: Central
- Rural District: Miyan Darband

Population (2006)
  - Total: 166
- Time zone: UTC+3:30 (IRST)
  - Summer (DST): UTC+4:30 (IRDT)

Goruran-e Do Dang (Persian: گروران دودانگ, also Romanized as Gorūrān-e Do Dang) is a village in Miyan Darband Rural District, in the Central District of Kermanshah County, Kermanshah Province, Iran. During the 2006 census, its population was 166, in 38 families.
