= Kolah Kabud-e Vosta =

Kolah Kabud-e Vosta كلاه كبودوسطي
- Village
- Location within Iran
- Coordinates: 34°33′13″N 46°51′12″E
- Country: Iran
- Province: Kermanshah
- County: Kermanshah
- Bakhsh: Central
- Rural District: Miyan Darband

Population (2006)
  - Total: 44
- Time zone: UTC+3:30 (IRST)
  - Summer (DST): UTC+4:30 (IRDT)

Kolah Kabud-e Vosta (Persian: كلاه كبودوسطي, also Romanized as Kolāh Kabūd-e Vosţá; also known as Kalā Kabūd-e Vasaţ) is a village in Miyan Darband Rural District, in the Central District of Kermanshah County, Kermanshah Province, Iran. At the 2006 census, its population was 44, in 11 families.
