= Gakiyeh, Miyan Darband =

Village in Kermanshah, Iran

Gakiyeh گاكيه
- Village
- Location within Iran
- Coordinates: 34°34′30″N 46°57′40″E
- Country: Iran
- Province: Kermanshah
- County: Kermanshah
- Bakhsh: Central
- Rural District: Miyan Darband

Population (2006)
  - Total: 351
- Time zone: UTC+3:30 (IRST)
  - Summer (DST): UTC+4:30 (IRDT)

Gakiyeh (Persian: گاكيه, also Romanized as Gākīyeh and Gākeyeh; also known as Gakīa) is a village in Miyan Darband Rural District, in the Central District of Kermanshah County, Kermanshah Province, Iran. At the 2006 census, its population was 351, in 76 families.
