= Qazanchi =

Village in Kermanshah province, Iran

Qazanchi Persian: قزانچي
- Village
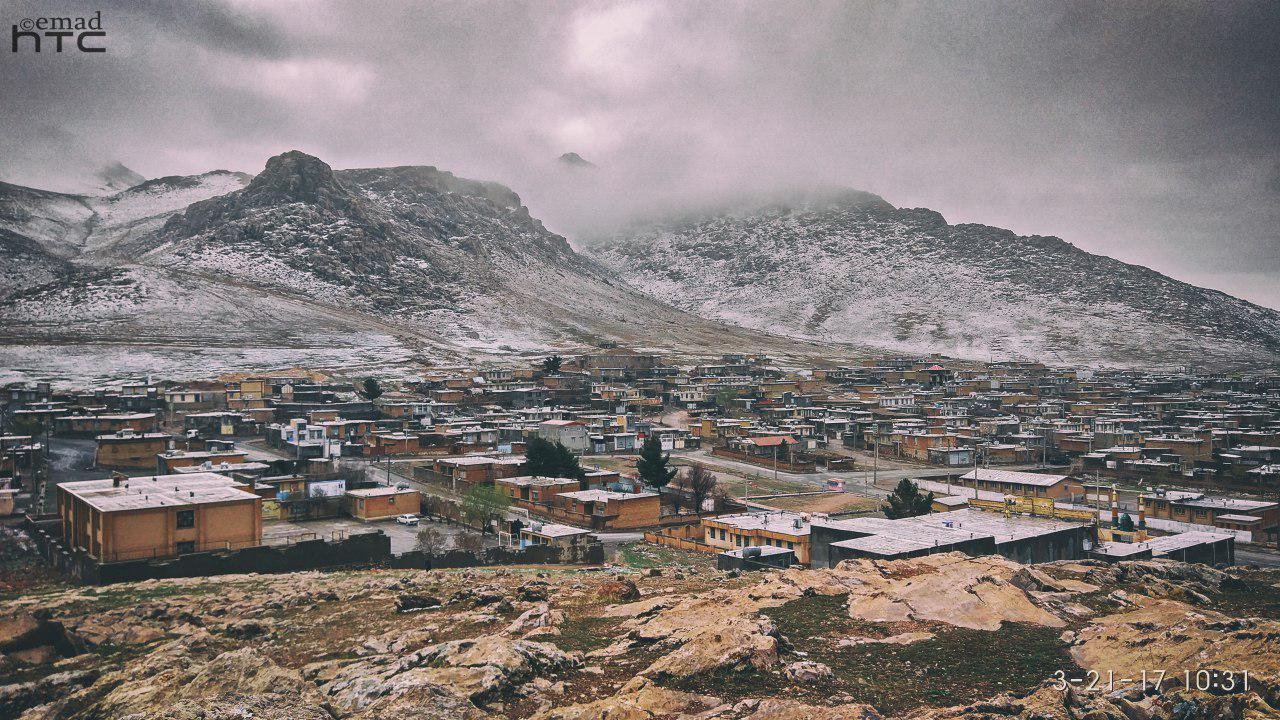
- Qazanchi in winter

- Location within Iran
- Coordinates: 34°26′34″N 47°01′32″E
- Country: Iran
- Province: Kermanshah
- County: Kermanshah
- District: Central
- Rural District: Miyan Darband

Population (2016)
  - Total: 2,755
- Time zone: UTC+3:30 (IRST)

Qazanchi (Persian: قزانچي) (Note: Also romanized as Qazānchī; also known as Farānchī and Khazānchī) is a village in, and the capital of, Miyan Darband Rural District of the Central District of Kermanshah County, Kermanshah province, Iran.

== Demographics ==
=== Population ===
At the time of the 2006 National Census, the village's population was 2,290 in 565 households. The following census in 2011 counted 2,772 people in 800 households. The 2016 census measured the population of the village as 2,755 people in 793 households. It was the most populous village in its rural district.
