= Jelugireh =

Jelugireh (Persian: جلوگيره), also rendered as Jelogireh, may refer to:

- Jelugireh-ye Olya
- Jelugireh-ye Sofla
