= Surni-ye Olya =

Village in Kermanshah, Iran

Surni-ye Olya سورني عليا
- Village
- Location within Iran
- Coordinates: 34°41′45″N 47°01′00″E
- Country: Iran
- Province: Kermanshah
- County: Kermanshah
- Bakhsh: Central
- Rural District: Razavar

Population (2006)
  - Total: 265
- Time zone: UTC+3:30 (IRST)
  - Summer (DST): UTC+4:30 (IRDT)

Surni-ye Olya (Persian: سورني عليا, also Romanized as Sūrnī-ye ‘Olyā, Soorenié Olya, and Sūrenī-ye ‘Olyā; also known as Sūrīni, Sūrīnī-ye ‘Olyā, Sūrnī-ye Bālā, and Sūrnīyeh-ye Bālā) is a village in Razavar Rural District, in the Central District of Kermanshah County, Kermanshah Province, Iran. At the 2006 census, its population was 265, in 65 families.
