= Goruran-e Chahar Dang =

Goruran-e Chahar Dang گروران چهاردانگ
- Village
- Location within Iran
- Coordinates: 34°37′31″N 46°54′11″E
- Country: Iran
- Province: Kermanshah
- County: Kermanshah
- Bakhsh: Central
- Rural District: Miyan Darband

Population (2006)
  - Total: 169
- Time zone: UTC+3:30 (IRST)
  - Summer (DST): UTC+4:30 (IRDT)

Goruran-e Chahar Dang (Persian: گروران چهاردانگ, also Romanized as Gorūrān-e Chahār Dāng; also known as Gorūrān-e Chahār Dāngeh) is a village in Miyan Darband Rural District, in the Central District of Kermanshah County, Kermanshah Province, Iran. At the 2006 census, its population was 169, in 39 families.
