= Vozmaleh, Miyan Darband =

Vozmaleh وزمله
- Village
- Interactive map of Vozmaleh
- Country: Iran
- Province: Kermanshah
- County: Kermanshah
- Bakhsh: Central
- Rural District: Miyan Darband

Population (2006)
  - Total: 96
- Time zone: UTC+3:30 (IRST)
  - Summer (DST): UTC+4:30 (IRDT)

Vozmaleh (Persian: وزمله) is a village in Miyan Darband Rural District, in the Central District of Kermanshah County, Kermanshah Province, Iran. At the 2006 census, its population was 96, in 24 families.
