= Jelugireh-ye Sofla =

Jelugireh-ye Sofla جلوگيره سفلي
- Village
- Location within Iran
- Coordinates: 34°35′25″N 46°51′21″E
- Country: Iran
- Province: Kermanshah
- County: Kermanshah
- Bakhsh: Central
- Rural District: Miyan Darband

Population (2006)
  - Total: 91
- Time zone: UTC+3:30 (IRST)
  - Summer (DST): UTC+4:30 (IRDT)

Jelugireh-ye Sofla (Persian: جلوگيره سفلي, also Romanized as Jelūgīreh-ye Soflá; also known as Jelogīreh-ye Soflá) is a village in Miyan Darband Rural District, in the Central District of Kermanshah County, Kermanshah Province, Iran. At the 2006 census, its population was 91, in 23 families.
