= Kaliyan, Iran =

Kaliyan or Kalian or Kalyan or Kaleyan (Persian: كليان), in Iran, may refer to:

- Kalyan, Meyaneh, East Azerbaijan Province
- Kalian, Sarab, East Azerbaijan Province
- Kalyan, Varzaqan, East Azerbaijan Province
- Kaliyan, Kerman
- Kalian-e Olya, Kermanshah Province
- Kalian-e Sofla, Kermanshah Province
- Kalian-e Vosta, Kermanshah Province
- Kaleyan, Zanjan
