= Surni-ye Sofla =

Surni-ye Sofla سورني سفلي
- Village
- Location within Iran
- Coordinates: 34°41′39″N 47°00′52″E
- Country: Iran
- Province: Kermanshah
- County: Kermanshah
- Bakhsh: Central
- Rural District: Razavar

Population (2006)
  - Total: 248
- Time zone: UTC+3:30 (IRST)
  - Summer (DST): UTC+4:30 (IRDT)

Surni-ye Sofla (Persian: سورني سفلي, also Romanized as Sūrnī-ye Soflá, Soorenié Sofla, and Sūrenī-ye Soflá; also known as Sūrīni, Sūrīnī-ye Soflá, and Sūrnī-ye Pā'īn) is a village in Razavar Rural District, in the Central District of Kermanshah County, Kermanshah Province, Iran. At the 2006 census, its population was 248, in 56 families.
