= Kolah Kabud-e Sofla =

Kolah Kabud-e Sofla كلاه كبودسفلي
- Village
- Location within Iran
- Coordinates: 34°32′59″N 46°51′44″E
- Country: Iran
- Province: Kermanshah
- County: Kermanshah
- Bakhsh: Central
- Rural District: Miyan Darband

Population (2006)
  - Total: 122
- Time zone: UTC+3:30 (IRST)
  - Summer (DST): UTC+4:30 (IRDT)

Kolah Kabud-e Sofla (Persian: كلاه كبودسفلي, Southern Kurdish: کوڵە کەو خوار also romanized as Kolāh Kabūd-e Soflá; also known as Kalā Kabūd-e Pā'īn) is a village in Miyan Darband Rural District, in the Central District of Kermanshah County, Kermanshah Province, Iran. At the 2006 census, its population was 122, in 29 families.
