= Jelugireh-ye Olya =

Jelugireh-ye Olya جلوگيره عليا
- Village
- Location within Iran
- Coordinates: 34°35′00″N 46°50′30″E
- Country: Iran
- Province: Kermanshah
- County: Kermanshah
- Bakhsh: Central
- Rural District: Miyan Darband

Population (2006)
  - Total: 134
- Time zone: UTC+3:30 (IRST)
  - Summer (DST): UTC+4:30 (IRDT)

Jelugireh-ye Olya (Persian: جلوگيره عليا, also Romanized as Jelūgīreh-ye ‘Olyā; also known as Jelogīreh-ye ‘Olyā) is a village in Miyan Darband Rural District, in the Central District of Kermanshah County, Kermanshah Province, Iran. At the 2006 census, its population was 134, in 32 families.
