= Lakshmi Kalyanam =

Lakshmi Kalyanam may refer to:

- Lakshmi Kalyanam (1968 film), an Indian film by 1968 film by G. Or. Nathan
- Lakshmi Kalyanam (2007 film), an Indian film
- Lakshmi Kalyanam (TV series), an Indian TV series
- Lakshmi Kalyanam, an Indian TV series

== See also ==
- Lakshmi (disambiguation)
- Kalyanam (disambiguation)
