= Qaleh, Kermanshah =

City in Kermanshah province, Iran

Qaleh Persian: قلعه
- City
- Location within Iran
- Coordinates: 34°44′06″N 46°53′47″E
- Country: Iran
- Province: Kermanshah
- County: Kermanshah
- District: Bilavar

Population (2016)
  - Total: 1,130
- Time zone: UTC+3:30 (IRST)

Qaleh (Persian: قلعه) (Note: Also romanized as Qal‘eh) is a city in, and the capital of, Bilavar District of Kermanshah County, Kermanshah province, Iran. It also serves as the administrative center for Razavar Rural District.

== Demographics ==
=== Population ===
At the time of the 2006 National Census, Qaleh's population was 978 in 230 households, when it was a village in Razavar Rural District of the Central District. The following census in 2011 counted 1,160 people in 316 households, by which time the rural district had been separated from the district in the formation of Bilavar District. The 2016 census measured the population of the city as 1,130 people in 315 households. It was the most populous village in its rural district.

After the census, Qaleh was elevated to the status of a city.
