= Unchahar Junction railway station =

Railway station in Uttar Pradesh, India

Unchahar Junction
- Indian Railway Logo

General information
- Location: NTPC Highway Link, Lucknow–Allahabad Road, Unchahar, Rae Bareli district, Uttar Pradesh; India
- Coordinates: 25°54′N 81°18′E
- Elevation: 107 metres (351 ft)
- System: Express train and Passenger train station
- Owner: Ministry of Railways (India)
- Operator: Indian Railways
- Lines: Mughalsarai–Kanpur section, Varanasi–Rae Bareli–Lucknow line
- Platforms: 3
- Tracks: 5

Construction
- Structure type: At grade
- Parking: Yes
- Accessible: Available

Other information
- Status: Functioning
- Station code: UCR
- Zone(s): Northern Railway
- Division(s): Lucknow NR
Location
- Location within Uttar Pradesh Location within India

Unchahar Junction railway station (station code:- UCR) is the junction railway station located in Unchahar, Rae Bareli district, Uttar Pradesh state, India. It consists of three platforms. It falls under Northern Railway zone's Lucknow NR railway division.

Unchahar changed dramatically after the work done by former Member of Legislative Assembly, Late. Har Narayan Singh. Some of his work include the establishment of the well known Feroze Gandhi Thermal Power Station of the National Thermal Power Corporation, which now has an installed capacity of 1050 MW and the launching of the daily train Unchahar Express connecting Allahabad with Chandigarh.
