= Razin, Kermanshah =

Village in Kermanshah province, Iran

Razin Persian: رزين
- Village
- Location within Iran
- Coordinates: 34°39′43″N 47°04′01″E
- Country: Iran
- Province: Kermanshah
- County: Kermanshah
- District: Bilavar
- Rural District: Posht Darband

Population (2016)
  - Total: 952
- Time zone: UTC+3:30 (IRST)

Razin (Persian: رزين) (Note: Also romanized as Razīn; also known as Rāzīān and Rūzīn) is a village in Posht Darband Rural District of Bilavar District, Kermanshah County, Kermanshah province, Iran.

== Demographics ==
=== Population ===
At the time of the 2006 National Census, the village's population was 973 in 232 households, when it was in the Central District. The following census in 2011 counted 1,015 people in 281 households, by which time the rural district had been separated from the district in the establishment of Bilavar District. The 2016 census measured the population of the village as 952 people in 277 households. It was the most populous village in its rural district.
