= Gakiyeh, Dorudfaraman =

Gakiyeh گاكيه
- Village
- Location within Iran
- Coordinates: 34°19′12″N 47°13′07″E
- Country: Iran
- Province: Kermanshah
- County: Kermanshah
- Bakhsh: Central
- Rural District: Dorudfaraman

Population (2006)
  - Total: 520
- Time zone: UTC+3:30 (IRST)
  - Summer (DST): UTC+4:30 (IRDT)

Gakiyeh (Persian: گاكيه, also Romanized as Gākīyeh and Gākeyeh; also known as Gākia) is a village in Dorudfaraman Rural District, in the Central District of Kermanshah County, Kermanshah Province, Iran. At the 2006 census, its population was 520, in 115 families.
