= Newada =

Newada may refer to the following places in India:

- Newada, Sahar, Bihar
- Newada, Shahabad, Hardoi, Uttar Pradesh
- Newada, Raebareli, Uttar Pradesh
- Newada, Miyanganj, Unnao district, Uttar Pradesh
- Newada, Asoha, Purwa tehsil, Unnao district, Uttar Pradesh

== See also ==
- Nevada (disambiguation)
