= Goruran-e Olya =

Goruran-e Olya گروران عليا
- Village
- Location within Iran
- Coordinates: 34°40′21″N 47°03′14″E
- Country: Iran
- Province: Kermanshah
- County: Kermanshah
- Bakhsh: Central
- Rural District: Poshtdarband

Population (2006)
  - Total: 129
- Time zone: UTC+3:30 (IRST)
  - Summer (DST): UTC+4:30 (IRDT)

Goruran-e Olya (Persian: گروران عليا, also Romanized as Gorūrān-e ‘Olyā; also known as Gorūrān and Korūrān ‘Olyā) is a village in Poshtdarband Rural District, in the Central District of Kermanshah County, Kermanshah Province, Iran. At the 2006 census, its population was 129, in 27 families.
