= Kalyanaraman =

Kalyanaraman may refer to:

- Kalyanaraman (1979 film), an Indian Tamil-language supernatural comedy directed by G. N. Rangarajan
- Kalyanaraman (2002 film), an Indian Malayalam-language romantic comedy directed by Shafi
- S. Kalyanaraman (1930–1994), Indian Carnatic classical vocalist

== See also ==
- Kalyan (disambiguation)
- Raman (disambiguation)
