= Kalyan (disambiguation) =

Kalyan is a city in the Thane district of Maharashtra, India.

Kalyan may also refer to:

== Places ==
- Kalyan, Nepal, village Development Committee in mid-western Nepal
- Kalyan, Pakistan, village of Lahore District, Pakistan
- Kalyan, South Australia, a former town
- Kalyan taluka, administrative subdivision of Thana district, Maharashtra, India
- Basava Kalyan, a town in Karnataka

== People ==
- Kalyan (choreographer), Indian film choreographer
- Maninder Singh Kalyan (later known as Byg Byrd), Indo-Canadian singer and record producer
- Pawan Kalyan, Telugu cinema actor
- Kalyan Varma, Wildlife Filmmaker and photographer
- Kalanos, or Kalyana, Indian sage who accompanied the conquests of Alexander the Great

== Other ==
- Kalyan (Lok Sabha constituency), in Maharashtra, India
- Kalyan (thaat), in Hindustani music
- Kalyan Assembly constituency, a former constituency in Maharashtra, India
- Kalyan, a Hindi monthly published by Gita Press

== See also ==
- Po-i-Kalyan, the Kalyan Minaret, located in Uzbekistan
- Kaliyan, Iran (disambiguation)
- Kalyanam (disambiguation)
- Kalyani (disambiguation)
- Calanus (disambiguation)
