= NTPC power plant explosion =

2017 industrial disaster in India

- Date: 1 November 2017
- Time: 3:30 p.m. (IST)
- Venue: Feroze Gandhi Unchahar Thermal Power Station
- Location: Unchahar, Uttar Pradesh, India; 25°54′52″N 81°19′36″E
- Type: Boiler explosion
- Cause: Unknown
- Deaths: 38
- Injuries: 90+

The NTPC power plant explosion was a boiler explosion that occurred on 1 November 2017 at a newly commissioned 500-megawatt unit of the Feroze Gandhi Unchahar coal-fired power plant. The plant is operated by government-owned National Thermal Power Corporation (NTPC) Limited, in Unchahar, Uttar Pradesh, India. The explosion killed 32 people who may have been cleaning ash from the boiler's interior.

== Explosion ==
On 1 November 2017, at around 3:30 p.m. local time (GMT +5:30) a boiler explosion occurred at the 1,550-megawatt (MW) Feroze Gandhi Unchahar Thermal Power Station operated by government-owned National Thermal Power Corporation (NTPC) Limited, in Unchahar, Raebareli district, Uttar Pradesh, India, killing 38 people and injuring 100 others. The blast hit the 500-MW Unit 6 that had been operating since April 2017. At the time nearly two hundred workers were on duty.

According to a statement released by NTPC, "there was sudden abnormal sound at 20 m. elevation and there was an opening ... from which hot flue gases and steam escaped, affecting the people working around the area".

Three plant officials were suspended and arrested in connection with the explosion. They were charged with criminal negligence causing death and later granted bail by the Allahabad High Court.

== Response ==
More than 150 ambulances were engaged in relief and rescue work. Central Reserve Police Force and local police were deployed at the plant which was sealed to check any unauthorised entry.

== Reaction ==
The Uttar Pradesh state government offered cash compensation of Rs. 200,000 ($4,015) to the families of the deceased, Rs. 50,000 for the severely injured and Rs. 25,000 to those who sustained minor injuries. India's Minister of Power R. K. Singh announced Rs. 2 million ex gratia for the next of kin of those killed in the accident.

Indian Prime Minister Narendra Modi in a statement said that he was "deeply pained by the accident at the NTPC plant in Raebareli". He further added that, "my thoughts are with the bereaved families. May the injured recover quickly. The situation is being closely monitored and officials are ensuring normalcy is restored".

The National Human Rights Commission of India served a notice to the Uttar Pradesh (UP) government over the death of more than 30 people in the blast, demanding an immediate high-level probe into its cause. The UP government ordered a magisterial inquiry by a two-member technical team to determine the cause of the blast within seven days.

On 6 November 2017, Union Power Ministry has set up a committee headed by P.D. Siwal, Member of Central Electricity Authority (CEA) to investigate the causes of this accident and suggest measures to prevent such incidents in future.

The firm has launched an investigation into the blast at the plant, based near the town of Unchahar.
