= Ruzin =

Ruzin may refer to:

- Elham Mahamid Ruzin (b. 1990), Israeli Paralympic goalball player
- Nano Ružin (b. 1952), Macedonian academic
- Ruzhin Kerimov (b. 1956), Bulgarian footballer
- Ruzin, Iran, a village in Kermanshah Province, Iran
