= Goruran-e Sofla =

Goruran-e Sofla گروران سفلي
- Village
- Location within Iran
- Coordinates: 34°40′31″N 47°03′03″E
- Country: Iran
- Province: Kermanshah
- County: Kermanshah
- Bakhsh: Central
- Rural District: Poshtdarband

Population (2006)
  - Total: 35
- Time zone: UTC+3:30 (IRST)
  - Summer (DST): UTC+4:30 (IRDT)

Goruran-e Sofla (Persian: گروران سفلي, also Romanized as Gorūrān-e Soflá; also known as Gorūrān and Korūrān-e Soflá) is a village in Poshtdarband Rural District, in the Central District of Kermanshah County, Kermanshah Province, Iran. At the 2006 census, its population was 35, in 10 families.
