= Kotiya Chitra =

- Village
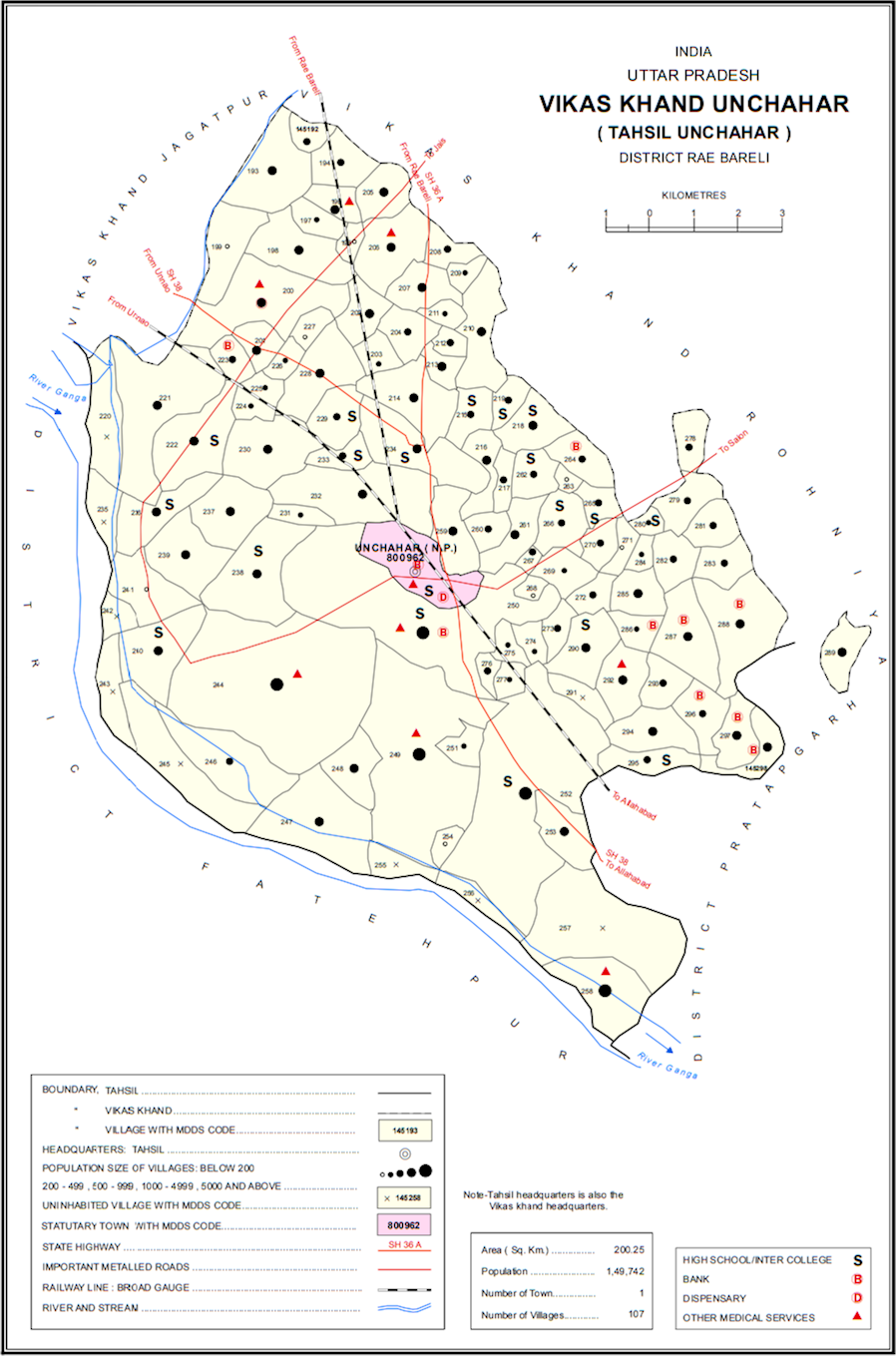
- Map showing Kotiya Chitra (#222) in Unchahar CD block

- Location in Uttar Pradesh, India
- Coordinates: 25.941165°N 81.232285°E
- Country India: India
- State: Uttar Pradesh
- District: Raebareli

Area
  - Total: 2.73 km^{2} (1.05 sq mi)

Population (2011)
  - Total: 3,575
  - Density: 1,310/km^{2} (3,390/sq mi)

Languages
  - Official: Hindi
- Time zone: UTC+5:30 (IST)
- Vehicle registration: UP-33

Kotiya Chitra is a village in Unchahar block of Raebareli district, Uttar Pradesh, India. It is located 42 km from Raebareli, the district headquarters. As of 2011, it has a population of 3,575 people, in 636 households. It has one primary school and no healthcare facilities.

The 1961 census recorded Kotiya Chitra (as "Kotia Chitra") as comprising 8 hamlets, with a total population of 1,775 people (913 male and 862 female), in 333 households and 322 physical houses. The area of the village was given as 687 acres.

The 1981 census recorded Kotiya Chitra as having a population of 2,222 people, in 495 households, and having an area of 272,76 hectares. The main staple foods were listed as wheat and rice.
