= Battle of Kalyani =

Battle of Kalyani may refer to these battles at Basavakalyan (formerly Kalyani):

- Battle of Kalyani (1543), or the First Battle of Kalyani, a confrontation between the Vijayanagara Empire and the combined forces of the Sultanates of Ahmadnagar, Golconda, and Bidar
- Battle of Kalyani (1549), or the Second Battle of Kalyani, a conflict fought between the allied forces of Vijayanagar and Ahmednagar against the sultanates of Bidar and Bijapur

== See also ==
- Kalyani (disambiguation)
- Battle of Kalyan, 1680s battles at Kalyan, Mahrashtra, India; part of the Deccan wars between the Mughals and the Marathas
