= Unchahar =

- Town
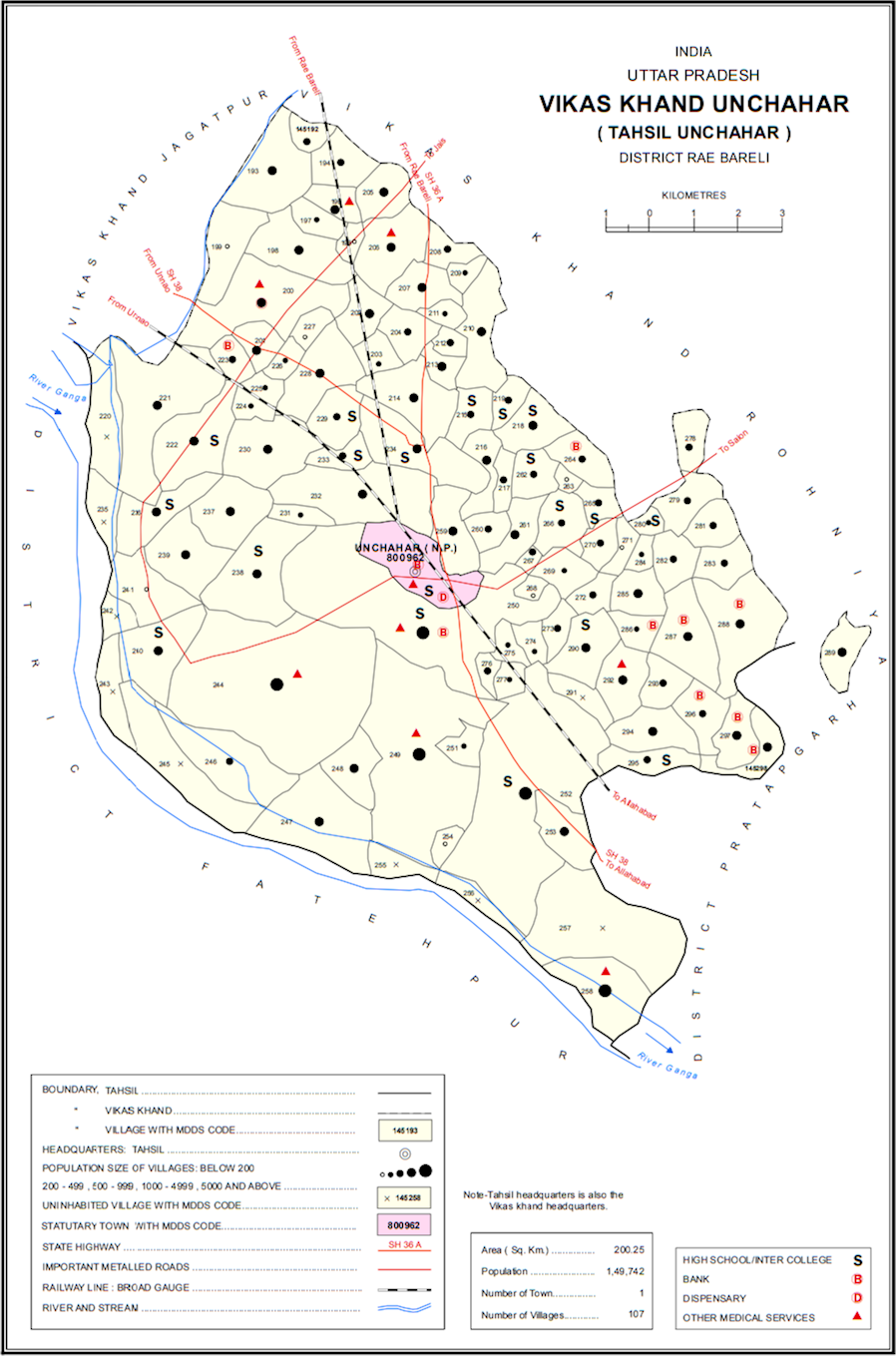
- Map of Unchahar CD block

- Location in Uttar Pradesh, India
- Coordinates: 25°54′N 81°18′E
- Country: India
- State: Uttar Pradesh
- Division: Lucknow
- District: Raebareli

Government
  - Type: Nagar Panchayat
  - Body: Tehsil
  - MLA: Manoj Kumar Panday

Area
  - Total: 1.65 km^{2} (0.64 sq mi)

Population (2011)
  - Total: 11,033
  - Density: 6,690/km^{2} (17,300/sq mi)

Languages
  - Official: Hindi
- Time zone: UTC+5:30 (IST)
- Postal code: 229404
- Vehicle registration: UP-33
- Sex ratio: 51/49 ♂/♀
- Literacy: 57%
- Distance from Lucknow: 115 kilometres (71 mi)
- Distance from Allahabad: 85 kilometres (53 mi)
- Distance from Ganges: 7 kilometres (4.3 mi)

Unchahar is a town and nagar panchayat in Raebareli district in the Indian state of Uttar Pradesh. It serves as the headquarters of a tehsil as well as a community development block. It is located on Lucknow Allahabad Highway, 115 km from Lucknow, 85 km from Allahabad. The place is well connected by rail and roads to nearby cities of Kanpur, Lucknow, and Allahabad. Unchahar is also a constituency of Uttar Pradesh Legislative assembly (183 Unchahar Vidhan Sabha).

Unchahar changed dramatically after the work done by former Member of Legislative Assembly, Har Narayan Singh. Some of his work include the establishment of the well known Feroze Gandhi Thermal Power Station of the National Thermal Power Corporation, which now has an installed capacity of 1050 MW and the launching of the daily train "Unchahar Express" connecting Allahabad with Chandigarh.

Basic public amenities are not so good despite the NTPC power plant, electricity supply is poor, although it is an important landmark in Raibareli.

== Geography ==
Unchahar is a town in the fertile Awadh region of Uttar Pradesh. The river Ganga flows 7 km southwest to the town. Unchahar has a humid subtropical climate with cool, dry winters from November to February and dry, hot summers from April to June. The rainy season is from July to mid-September. Fog is a common phenomenon from late December to late January. Unchahar is located 38 km from the district headquarters of the Raebareli. It has an average elevation of 111 metres. The dialect spoken here is the Awadhi variety of the Hindi language.

== History ==
The 1961 census recorded Unchahar as comprising 30 hamlets, with a total population of 4,109 people (2,139 male and 1,970 female), in 848 households and 822 physical houses. The area of the village was given as 3,490 acres and it had a library and a medical practitioner at that point.

The 1981 census recorded Unchahar as having a population of 7,282 people, in 1,852 households, and having an area of 1,412.36 hectares. The main staple foods were listed as wheat and rice.

The Feroze Gandhi Unchahar Thermal Power Station began operation in 1988 with five units each capable of generating 210 MW of electricity. Construction cost Rs. 219 crores. A sixth unit, generating 500 MW of electricity, commenced operation in March 2017. On 1 November 2017, the new unit's boiler pipe exploded, killing 32 people and injuring many more.

== Demographics ==
Historical population
Year	Pop.	±%
1991	6,708	—
2001	9,288	+38.5%
2011	11,033	+18.8%
Source: 2011 Census of India

According to the 2011 census, Unchahar has a population of 11,033 people, in 1,866 households. The town's sex ratio is 969 females to every 1000 males, which is higher than the district-wide urban sex ratio of 924; 5,602 of Unchahar's residents are male (50.8%) and 5,431 are female (49.2%). The 0-6 age group makes up about 13.0% of the town's population; the sex ratio for this group is 1003, which is the highest among towns in Raebareli district. Members of Scheduled Castes make up 4.45% of the town's population, while no members of Scheduled Tribes were recorded. Unchahar's literacy rate was 80.88% (counting only people age 7 and up); literacy was higher among men and boys (86.45%) than among women and girls (75.1%). The scheduled castes literacy rate is 71.08% (77.68% among men and boys, and 63.35% among women and girls).

In terms of employment, 18.22% of Unchahar residents were classified as main workers (i.e. people employed for at least 6 months per year) in 2011. Marginal workers (i.e. people employed for less than 6 months per year) made up 9.21%, and the remaining 72.57% were non-workers. Employment status varied considerably according to gender, with 46.32% of men being either main or marginal workers, compared to just 7.94% of women.

4.12% of Dalmau residents live in slum conditions as of 2011. There is 1 slum area in Unchahar, called Aliganj. This has an approximate population of 455 residents and has 4 tap water access points. The number of flush toilets installed in people's homes is 12. The area is serviced by open sewers.

== Transport ==
Unchahar Junction railway station is the main Junction railway station after Rae Bareli Junction railway station. It is located on Varanasi–Kanpur and Varanasi–Lucknow line. Unchahar Express is the only direct connected to Chandigarh.

== Villages ==
Unchahar CD block has the following 107 villages:

Village name	Total land area (hectares)	Population (in 2011)
Bheelampur	61.4	614
Sarain Hardo	294	1,938
Pooran Mau	108.7	848
Ramchandarpur	68.5	1,005
Kewal Nainpur	25.7	62
Kalyanpur	75.1	363
Kamoli	244.2	1,526
Shahabad	158	112
Kisundaspur	441	3,639
Ishwar Daspur	67	1,165
Sar Bahda	173.1	1,297
Miyanpur	50.6	383
Sarai Tula Ram	81	704
Chandrai	120.5	1,455
Matrauli	265.6	4,105
Semri Ranapur	114.3	1,011
Newada	120.5	814
Chaturpur Urf Misrapur	27.7	433
Kalikpur Kala	204	1,841
Bhagipur	57.3	446
Gopapur	49.2	670
Manipur Bhatehari	96.4	1,079
Sawayaya Hasan	281.1	2,312
Sawayaya Mira	132	945
Sawayya Raje	83	1,178
Jamalpur Mafi	65	618
Hatwa	169	1,062
Paindapur	77	593
Shahjadpur Ahtmali	95	0
Shahjadpur Mu.	515	1,671
Kotiya Chitra	273	3,575
Jamunapur	63	584
Mirza Inayatullapur	58	450
Baharpur	54	384
Gandhavi	38	418
Gopalpur Ghur Vansh	37	6
Ram Sanda	203	1,687
Daulatpur	120	954
Pach Khara	272	2,240
Hadipur	28	344
Sawanpur Newada	418	3,090
Najanpur	70	548
Sawaya Dhani	270	2,577
Gokana Ahtmali	31	0
Gokana Mustakil	216.2	1,927
Duraisa	204	1,103
Gangauli	376	3,917
Sarai Bhan	221	1,291
Kharauli Mustakil	411	4,256
Jarji Garh Mustakil	41	111
Jarji Garh Ahtmali	30	0
Kharauli Ahtmali	72	0
Kand Rawan	1,339.1	10,283
Pure Khoob Chand Ahtmali	494	0
Pure Khoob Chand Mustakil	331	993
Kalyani	174	1,681
Jabbaripur	213.4	1,400
Patti Rahas Kaithwalmustakil	213	5,769
Uncha Har Dehat	1,348	13,365
Mahmadpur Chandau	78	316
Arkha Mustakil	1,278	10,337
Jasauli	112	1,128
Har Bandhanpur	29	194
Patti Rahas Kaithwal Ahtamali	702	0
Arkha Ahtmali	553	0
Milikpur Ahtmali	373	0
Kotra Bahadur Ganj	740	5,696
Khojanpur	169	2,127
Dhamdhama	62	788
Baherawa	147	1,891
Hisampur	78	805
Kharg Sanpur	28	123
Gopalpur Dudhwan	132	913
Mani Rampur	78	659
Khurampur	97	963
Faridpur	39	574
Mirapur Dam Gani	29	91
Bahbanpur	91	460
Niranjanpur	28	582
Khanpur	49	72
Bikai	78	901
Sarai Parsoo	71	643
Khalikpur Khurd	40	298
Malkana	72	349
Madari Ganj	84	573
Gauraiya Mafi	43	273
Bhawanidinpur	80	699
Murar Mau	105	669
Bikar Garh	43	482
Bhuwalpur	70.2	762
Madaripur	87.2	657
Lal Chandpur Ikchhaniha	102.2	721
Kaleh	73	443
Sarai Sahijan	181	1,231
Madhopur Hardo Patti	55.7	280
Mokhara	227.1	1,730
Gangsari	300.3	2,011
Behra Mau	144	1,901
Purwara	287	2,269
Mahamadpur	34	0
Salimpur Bhaido	196	2,231
Narayanpur	104	528
Aima Jahanmiyan	135	1,356
Madhaopur Sultan	132	900
Hariharpur	103.8	766
Nigoha	113.2	1,188
Sukrullapur	232.2	1,320

== See also ==
- Rae Bareli (Lok Sabha constituency)
- 2017 NTPC power plant explosion
