= Kandrawan =

Kandrawan Kandrāwān
- Village
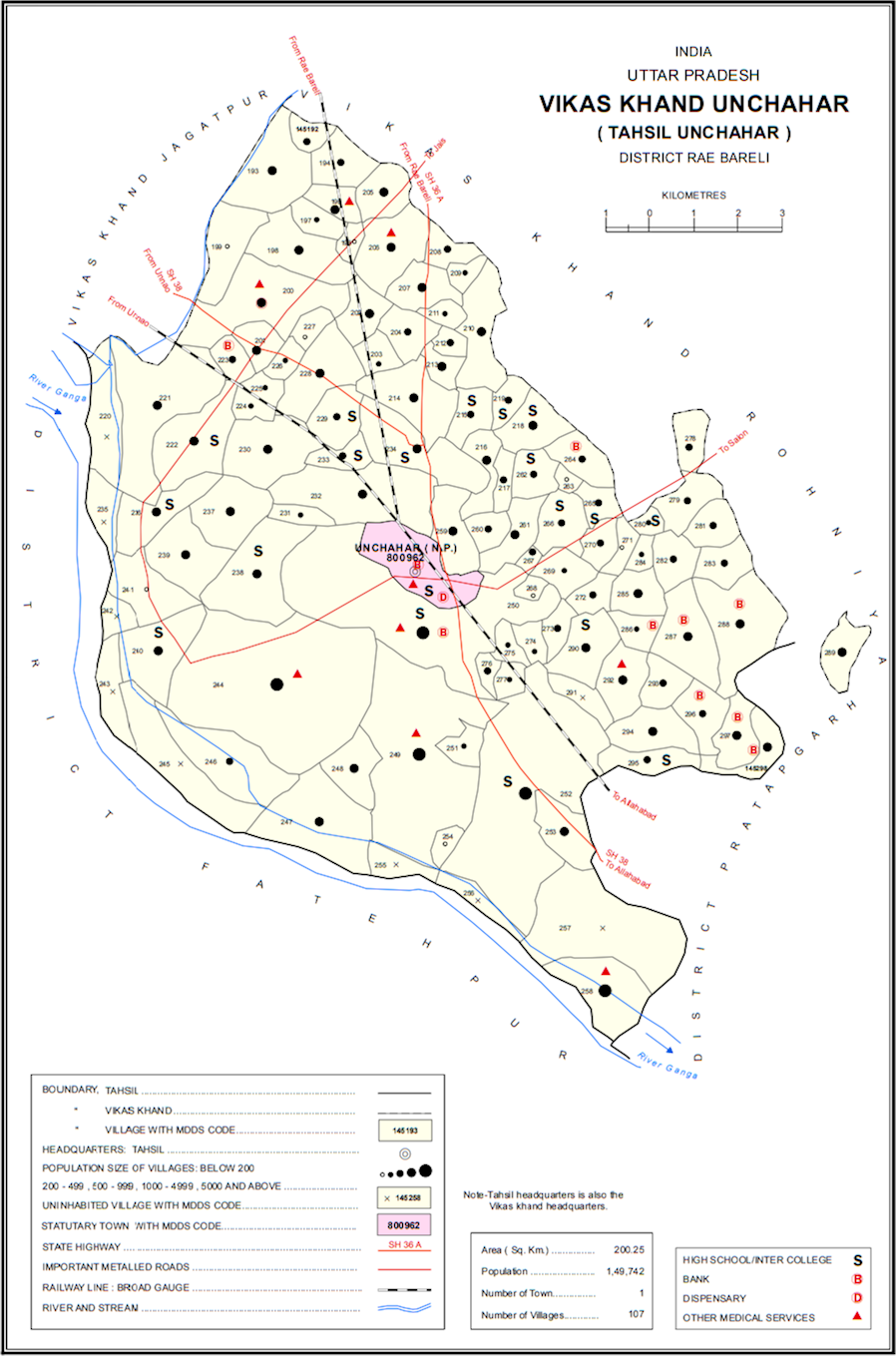
- Map showing Kandrawan (#244) in Unchahar CD block

- Location in Uttar Pradesh, India
- Coordinates: 25.888189°N 81.26185°E
- Country India: India
- State: Uttar Pradesh
- District: Raebareli

Area
  - Total: 13.391 km^{2} (5.170 sq mi)

Population (2011)
  - Total: 10,283
  - Density: 767.90/km^{2} (1,988.9/sq mi)

Languages
  - Official: Hindi
- Time zone: UTC+5:30 (IST)
- Vehicle registration: UP-35

Kandrawan is a village in Unchahar block of Raebareli district, Uttar Pradesh, India. It is located on the road from Salon to Khaga, near the banks of the Ganges. Nearby there is a ferry crossing the Ganges over to Naubasta in Fatehpur district. As of 2011, Kandrawan has a population of 10,283 people, in 1,901 households. It is 3 km from Unchahar.

This village is known as the birthplace of freedom fighter Dal Bahadur Singh. He was a close associate of Indira Gandhi, Feroze Gandhi, and Jawahar Lal Nehru. He was a Member of the Legislative Assembly. This village also has a temple known as Chahil Baba. It is believed that it was built in the 10th century. Other than it there are other temples named Shiv Mandir and Khanauveer Baba.

== History ==
At the turn of the 20th century, Kandrawan was described as a large but otherwise unimportant village in the pargana of Salon. It was divided into 5 mahals, of which 3 were held by Kanhpurias and 2 were held by Bais. As of 1901, its population was 3,581 people, a majority of whom were Ahirs.

The 1961 census recorded Kandrawan as comprising 39 hamlets, with a total population of 4,068 people (2,077 male and 1,991 female), in 892 households and 875 physical houses. The area of the village was given as 3,227 acres and it had a post office at that point.

The 1981 census recorded Kandrawan as having a population of 5,318 people, in 1,306 households, and having an area of 1,305.92 hectares. The main staple foods were listed as wheat and barley.
