= Khaliqpur Kalan =

Khaliqpur Kalan Khāliqpur Kalān
- Village
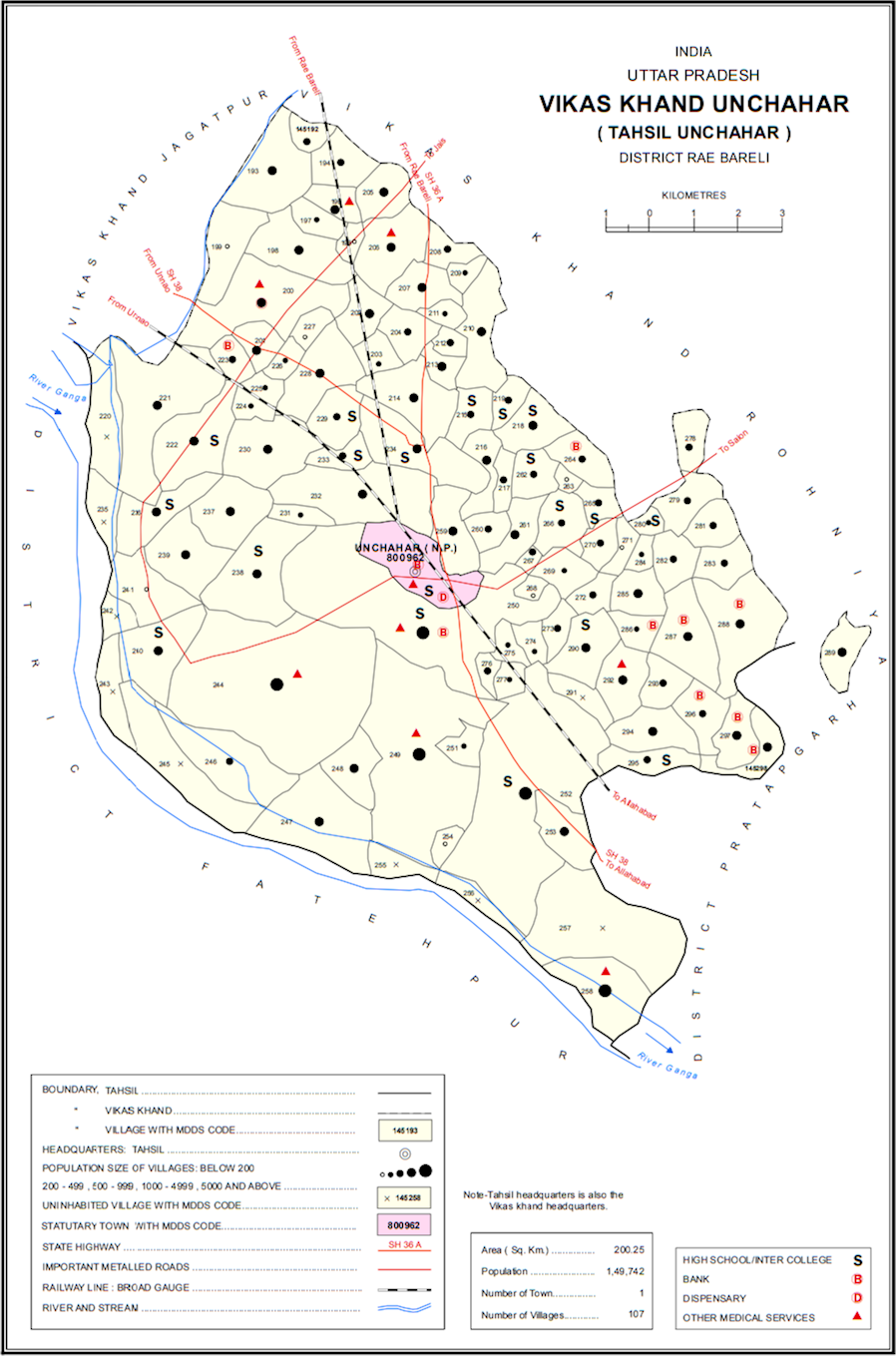
- Map showing Khaliqpur Kalan (#210) in Unchahar CD block

- Location in Uttar Pradesh, India
- Coordinates: 25.972365°N 81.304068°E
- Country India: India
- State: Uttar Pradesh
- District: Raebareli

Area
  - Total: 2.04 km^{2} (0.79 sq mi)

Population (2011)
  - Total: 1,841
  - Density: 902/km^{2} (2,340/sq mi)

Languages
  - Official: Hindi
- Time zone: UTC+5:30 (IST)
- Vehicle registration: UP-35

Khaliqpur Kalan is a village in Unchahar block of Raebareli district, Uttar Pradesh, India. It is located 30 km from Raebareli, the district headquarters. As of 2011, it has a population of 1,841 people, in 339 households.

The 1961 census recorded Khaliqpur Kalan as comprising 4 hamlets, with a total population of 590 people (300 male and 290 female), in 129 households and 129 physical houses. The area of the village was given as 494 acres.

The 1981 census recorded Khaliqpur Kalan (as "Khalikpur Kalan") as having a population of 760 people, in 189 households, and having an area of 203.55 hectares. The main staple foods were listed as wheat and rice.
