= Kalyanamam Kalyanam =

Kalyanamam Kalyanam (lit. 'Marriage') may refer to:

- Kalyanamam Kalyanam (film), a 1974 Indian film
- Kalyanamam Kalyanam (TV series), an Indian TV series

== See also ==
- Kalyanam (disambiguation)
