= Sarai Hardo =

Sarai Hardo Sarāi Hardo
- Village
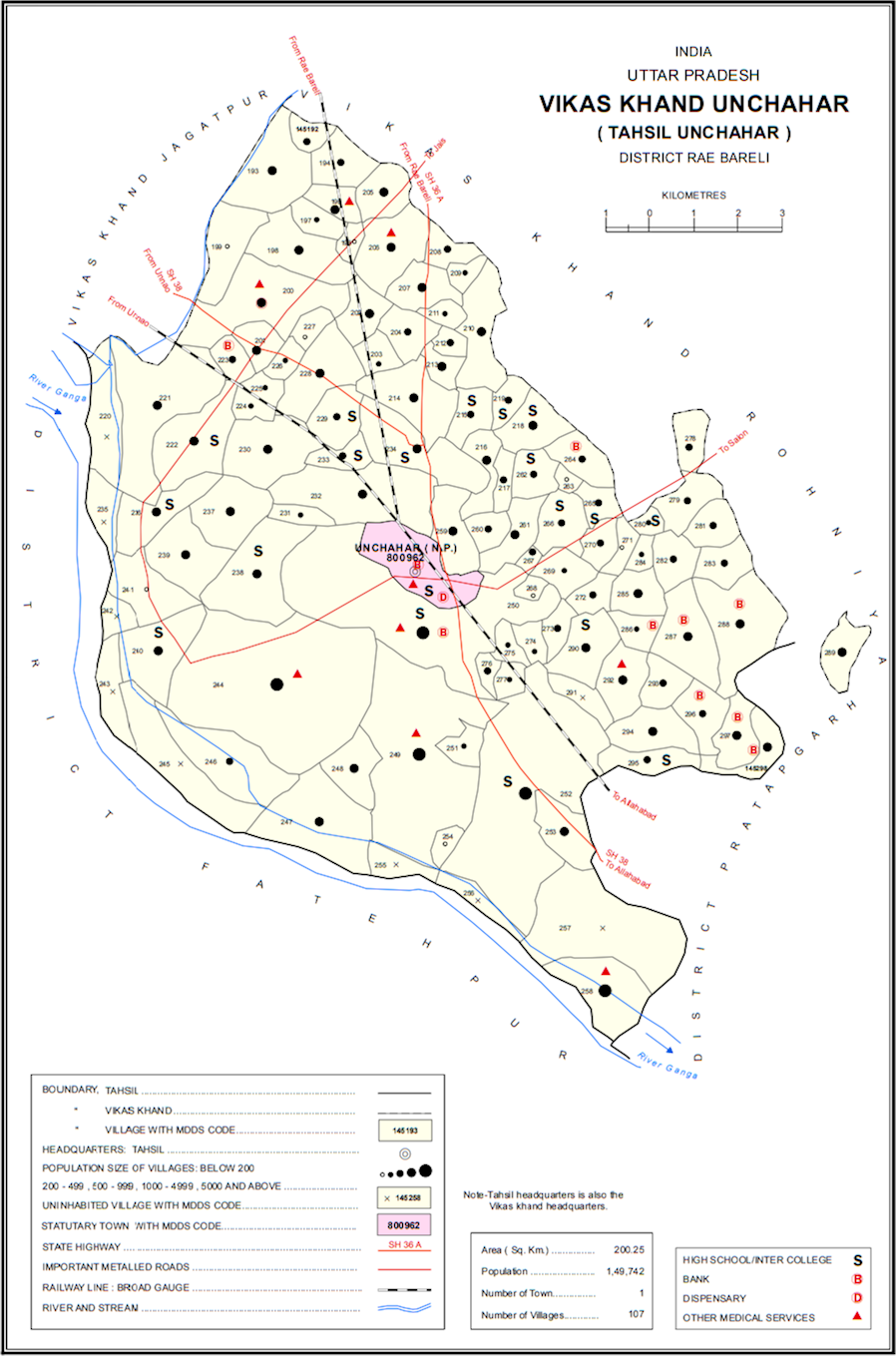
- Map showing Sarai Hardo (#193) in Unchahar CD block

- Location in Uttar Pradesh, India
- Coordinates: 25.99579°N 81.252077°E
- Country India: India
- State: Uttar Pradesh
- District: Raebareli

Area
  - Total: 2.94 km^{2} (1.14 sq mi)

Population (2011)
  - Total: 1,938
  - Density: 659/km^{2} (1,710/sq mi)

Languages
  - Official: Hindi
- Time zone: UTC+5:30 (IST)
- Vehicle registration: UP-35

Sarai Hardo is a village in Unchahar block of Raebareli district, Uttar Pradesh, India. It is located 30 km from Raebareli, the district headquarters. As of 2011, it has a population of 1,398 people, in 347 households.

The 1961 census recorded Sarai Hardo as comprising 6 hamlets, with a total population of 709 people (370 male and 339 female), in 172 households and 143 physical houses. The area of the village was given as 656 acres.

The 1981 census recorded Sarai Hardo as having a population of 1,031 people, in 255 households, and having an area of 253.73 hectares. The main staple foods were listed as wheat and rice.
