= Chandrai, Raebareli =

Chandrai
- Village
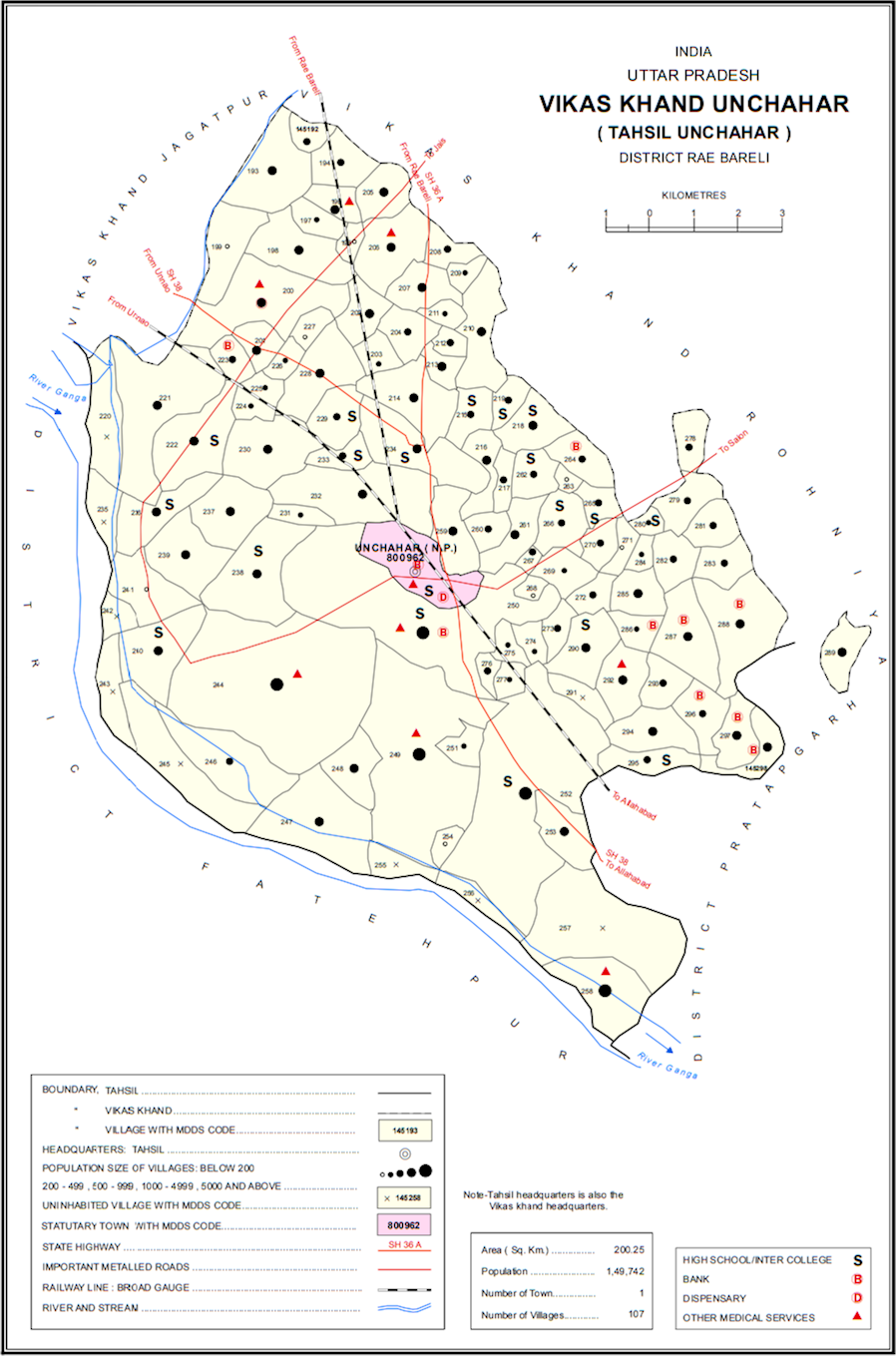
- Map showing Chandrai (#205) in Unchahar CD block

- Location in Uttar Pradesh, India
- Coordinates: 25.993331°N 81.281527°E
- Country India: India
- State: Uttar Pradesh
- District: Raebareli

Area
  - Total: 1.205 km^{2} (0.465 sq mi)

Population (2011)
  - Total: 1,455
  - Density: 1,207/km^{2} (3,127/sq mi)

Languages
  - Official: Hindi
- Time zone: UTC+5:30 (IST)
- Vehicle registration: UP-35

Chandrai is a village in Unchahar block of Raebareli district, Uttar Pradesh, India. It is located 30 km from Raebareli, the district headquarters. As of 2011, it has a population of 1,455 people, in 300 households. It has one primary school and no healthcare facilities.

The 1961 census recorded Chandrai as comprising 3 hamlets, with a total population of 536 people (287 male and 249 female), in 105 households and 104 physical houses. The area of the village was given as 312 acres.

The 1981 census recorded Chandrai as having a population of 832 people, in 200 households. The main staple foods were listed as wheat and rice.
