= Narayanpur, Unchahar =

Narayanpur Narāyanpur
- Village
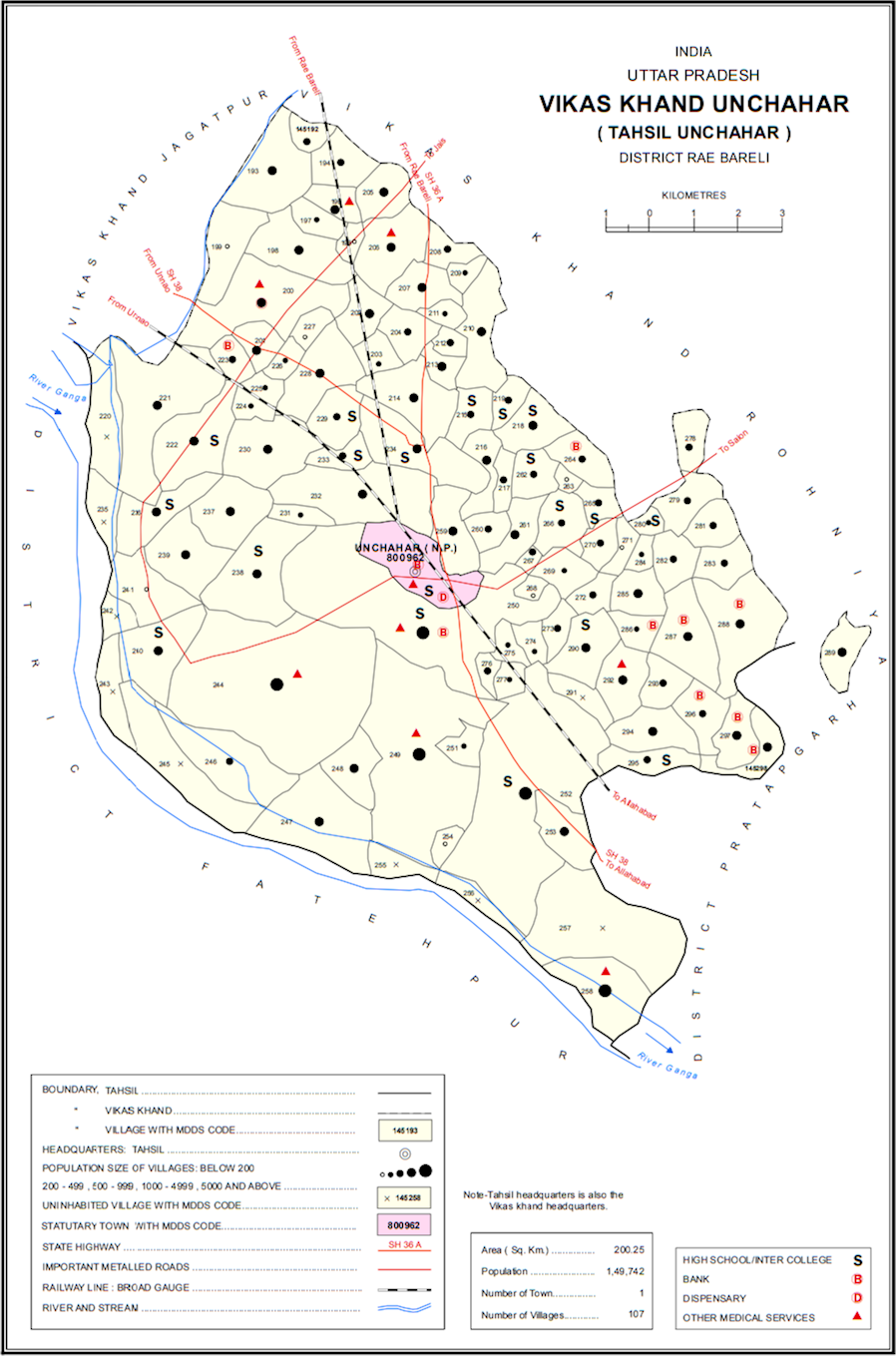
- Map showing Narayanpur (#293) in Unchahar CD block

- Location in Uttar Pradesh, India
- Coordinates: 25.887302°N 81.344684°E
- Country India: India
- State: Uttar Pradesh
- District: Raebareli

Area
  - Total: 1.04 km^{2} (0.40 sq mi)

Population (2011)
  - Total: 528
  - Density: 508/km^{2} (1,310/sq mi)

Languages
  - Official: Hindi
- Time zone: UTC+5:30 (IST)
- Vehicle registration: UP-35

Narayanpur is a village in Unchahar block of Raebareli district, Uttar Pradesh, India. It is located 38 km from Raebareli, the district headquarters. As of 2011, it has a population of 528 people, in 99 households.

The 1961 census recorded Narayanpur (as "Narainpur") as comprising 2 hamlets, with a total population of 179 people (89 male and 90 female), in 23 households and 23 physical houses. The area of the village was given as 273 acres.

The 1981 census recorded Narayanpur as having a population of 275 people, in 67 households, and having an area of 125.46 hectares. The main staple foods were listed as wheat and rice.
