= Arkha =

- Location in Uttar Pradesh, India
- Coordinates: 26.129°N 81.03425°E
- Country: India
- State: Uttar Pradesh
- District: Rae Bareli

Government
  - Member Of Parliament: Sonia Gandhi
  - Gram Pradhan: Sangeeta Pasi
- Elevation: 112 m (367 ft)

Population (2011 Census)
  - Total: 10,337

Languages
  - Official: Awadhi, Hindi
- Time zone: UTC+5:30 (IST)
- PIN: 229404
- Telephone code: 0535
- Vehicle registration: UP 33
- Website: raebareli.nic.in

Arkha is a Gram Sabha in Unchahar Tehsil of Raebareli District in Uttar Pradesh State, India. It is 40.15 km away from its district capital Rae Bareli. It is 114 km away from its state capital Lucknow. Its pin code is 229404.

== History ==
Arkha (Hindi: अरखा) was a zamindari whose leader RamGulam Singh at the time of British held a title of a Taluqdar which was given by the British Administration. However, Arkha joined Rana Beni Madho Singh of Shankarpur in the struggle against the British Raj in United Provinces of Agra and Oudh. In October 1920, Baba Ram Chandra came to Raebareli and established a Kisan Sabha in Arkha and Rasoolpur (Salon). Kissan Andolan of 1920-21 is written in golden letters in the history of Indian National Movement. In Non-Cooperation Movement of 1930, Raebareli was the first in U.P to give a lead to Namak Satyagrah and the people of Arkha were involved in the movement.

== Hospital ==
- Primary Health Centre (PHC).

== Transport ==
Arkha is connected by Road and Railways.

=== Road ===
NH24B passes through Arkha which connects it to Lucknow and Allahabad. Its 120 km away from Lucknow (2 1/2 hours) and 80 km away from Allahabad (1 1/2 hours). Uttar Pradesh State Highway 38 connects Arkha to Kanpur via Unnao.

=== Railways ===
Arkha Station is connected to Unchahar Junction which is 4.5 km away from Arkha. One can take The Unchahar Express which starts it journey from Chandigarh Junction and goes till Prayag Junction. Other than Unchahar Express, there are a lot of other trains like Nauchandi Express, Triveni Express, Ganga Gomti Express, etc. which stop at these stations.
