= Paindapur =

Paindapur Pāindāpur
- Village
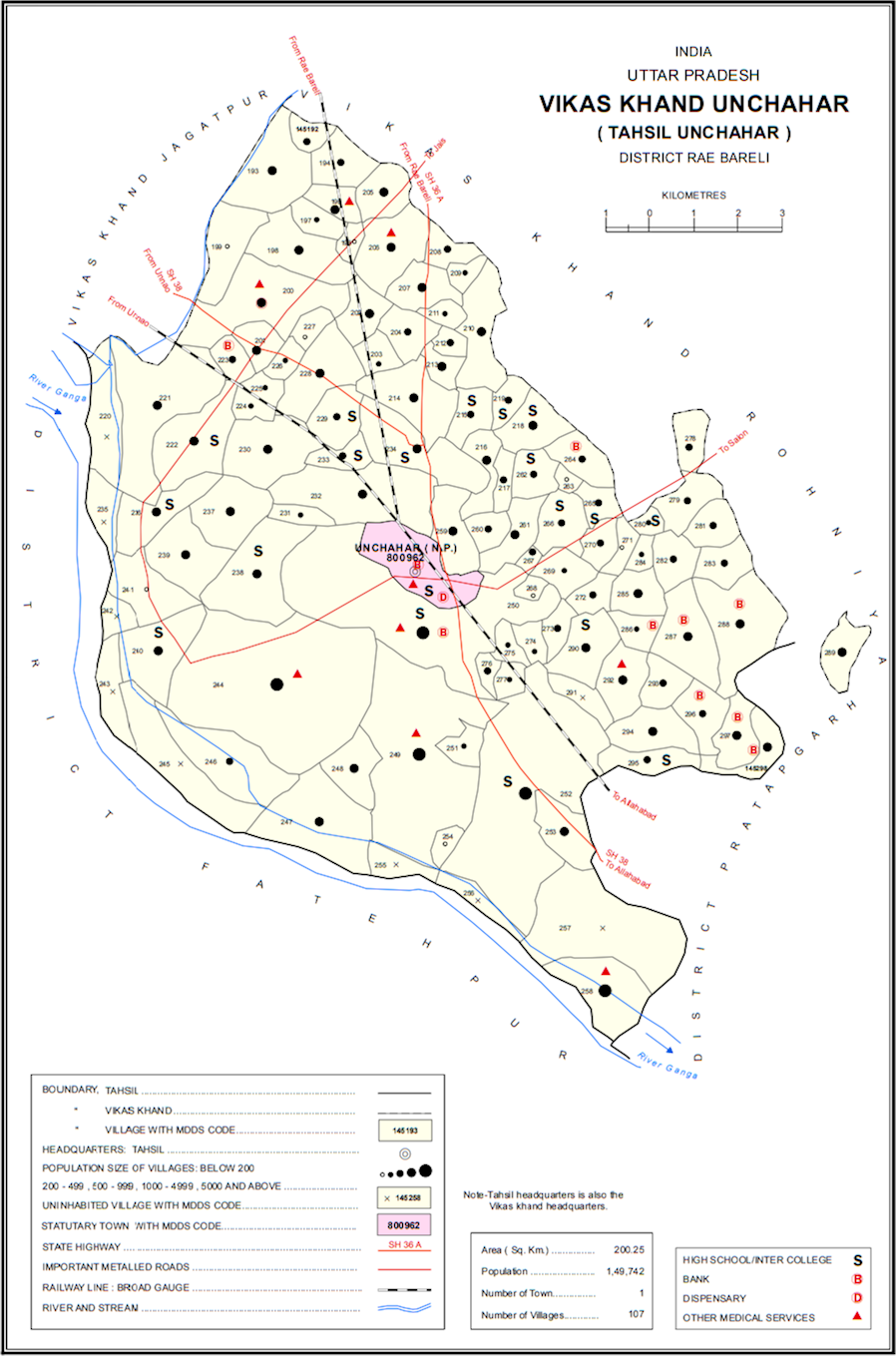
- Map showing Paindapur (#219) in Unchahar CD block

- Location in Uttar Pradesh, India
- Coordinates: 25.948953°N 81.310861°E
- Country India: India
- State: Uttar Pradesh
- District: Raebareli

Area
  - Total: 0.77 km^{2} (0.30 sq mi)

Population (2011)
  - Total: 593
  - Density: 770/km^{2} (2,000/sq mi)

Languages
  - Official: Hindi
- Time zone: UTC+5:30 (IST)
- Vehicle registration: UP-35

Paindapur is a village in Unchahar block of Raebareli district, Uttar Pradesh, India. It is located 36 km from Raebareli, the district headquarters. As of 2011, it has a population of 593 people, in 114 households.

The 1961 census recorded Paindapur as comprising 3 hamlets, with a total population of 192 people (101 male and 91 female), in 45 households and 45 physical houses. The area of the village was given as 197 acres.

The 1981 census recorded Paindapur as having a population of 226 people, in 53 households, and having an area of 76.89 hectares. The main staple foods were listed as wheat and rice.
