= Najanpur =

- Village
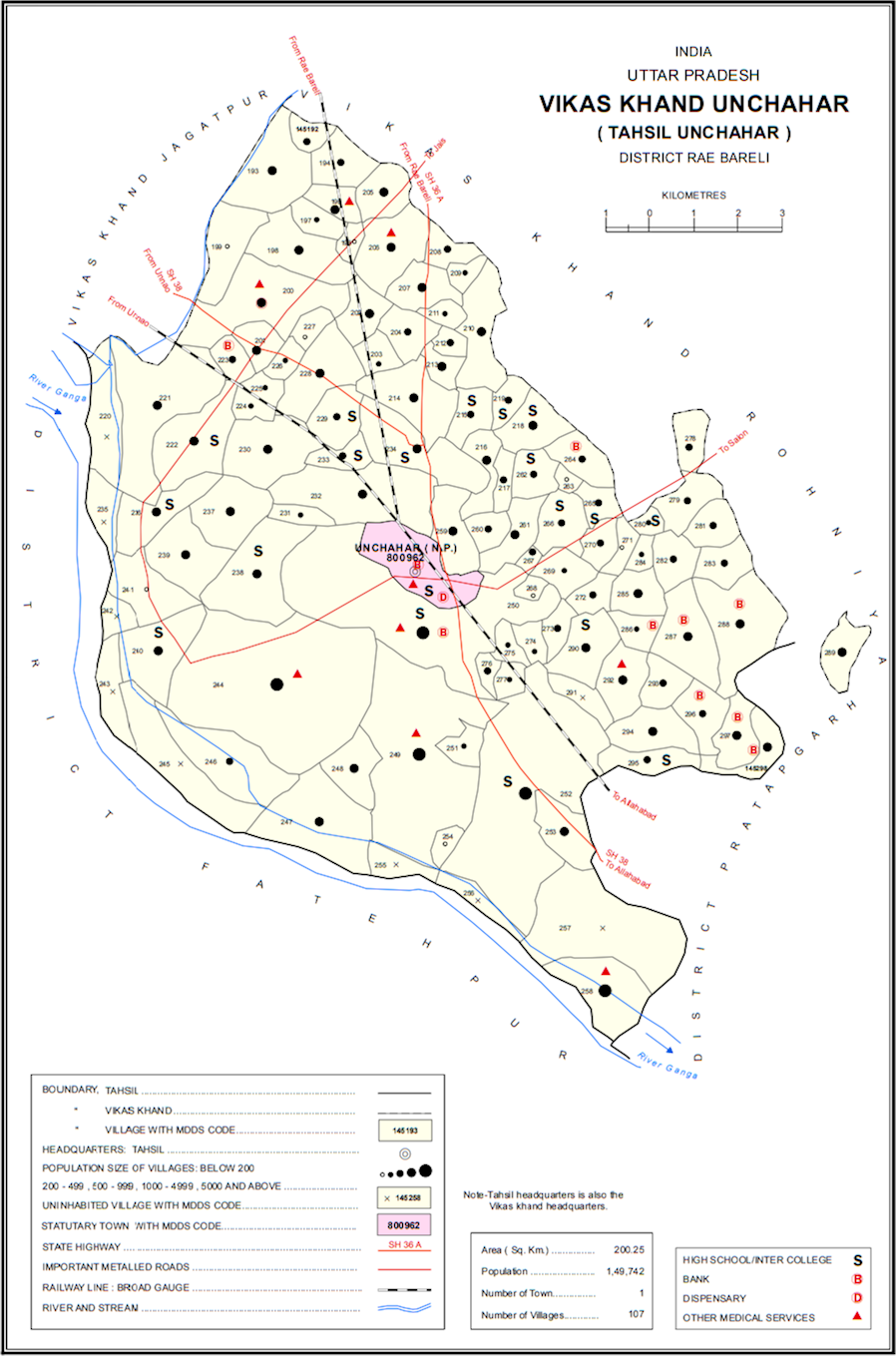
- Map showing Najanpur (#233) in Unchahar CD block

- Location in Uttar Pradesh, India
- Coordinates: 25.937723°N 81.272431°E
- Country India: India
- State: Uttar Pradesh
- District: Raebareli

Area
  - Total: 0.70 km^{2} (0.27 sq mi)

Population (2011)
  - Total: 548
  - Density: 780/km^{2} (2,000/sq mi)

Languages
  - Official: Hindi
- Time zone: UTC+5:30 (IST)
- Vehicle registration: UP-35

Najanpur is a village in Unchahar block of Raebareli district, Uttar Pradesh, India. It is located 35 km from Raebareli, the district headquarters. As of 2011, it has a population of 548 people, in 105 households. It has one primary school and no healthcare facilities.

The 1961 census recorded Najanpur as comprising 1 hamlet, with a total population of 160 people (86 male and 74 female), in 13 households and 13 physical houses. The area of the village was given as 172 acres.

The 1981 census recorded Najanpur as having a population of 225 people, in 48 households, and having an area of 70.00 hectares. The main staple foods were listed as wheat and rice.
