= Hatwa =

- Village
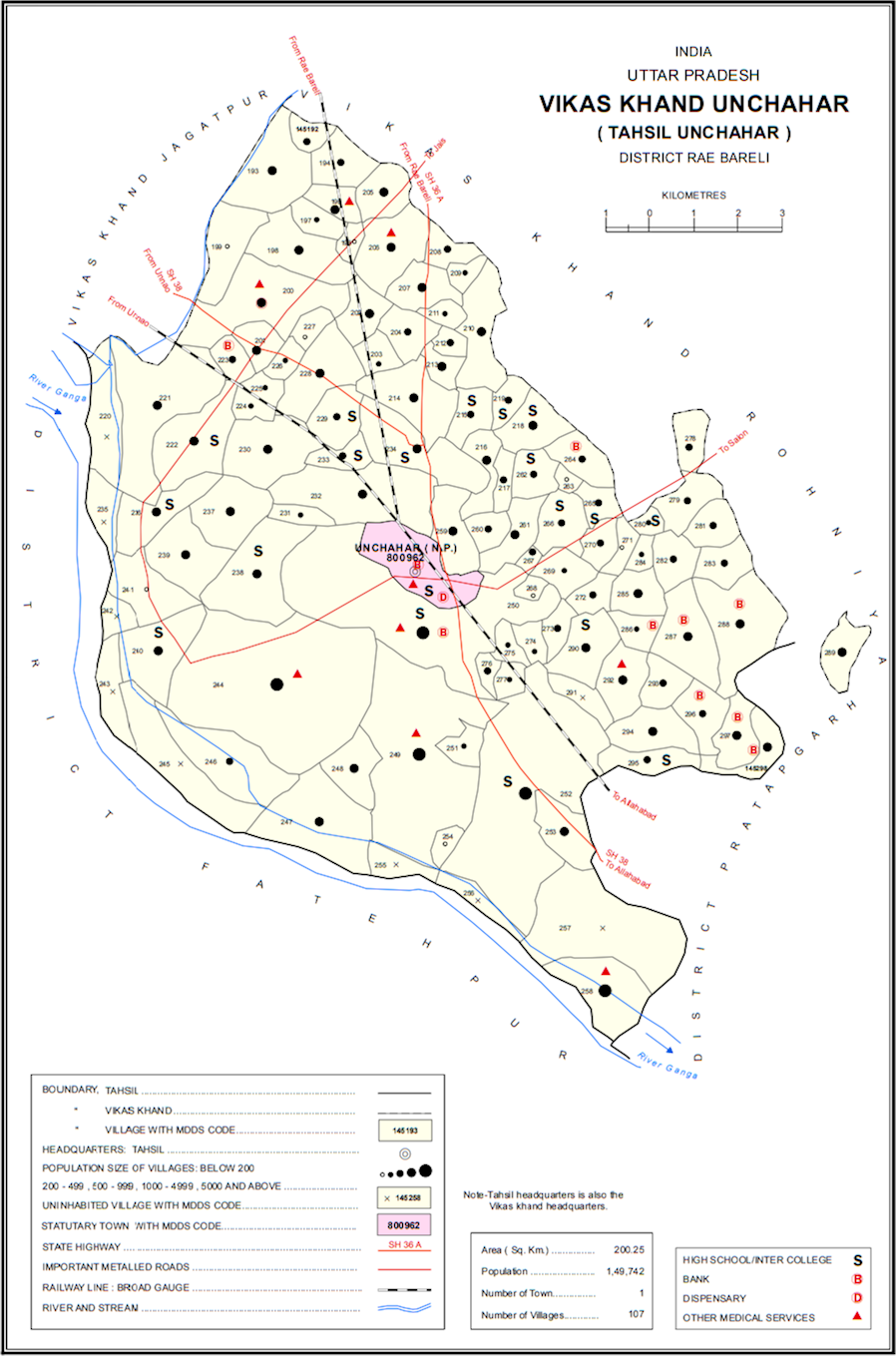
- Map showing Hatwa (#218) in Unchahar CD block

- Location in Uttar Pradesh, India
- Coordinates: 25.941968°N 81.317245°E
- Country India: India
- State: Uttar Pradesh
- District: Raebareli

Area
  - Total: 1.69 km^{2} (0.65 sq mi)

Population (2011)
  - Total: 1,062
  - Density: 628/km^{2} (1,630/sq mi)

Languages
  - Official: Hindi
- Time zone: UTC+5:30 (IST)
- Vehicle registration: UP-35

Hatwa is a village in Unchahar block of Raebareli district, Uttar Pradesh, India. It is located 36 km from Raebareli, the district headquarters. As of 2011, it has a population of 1,062 people, in 196 households.

The 1961 census recorded Hatwa as comprising 5 hamlets, with a total population of 418 people (214 male and 204 female), in 97 households and 97 physical houses. The area of the village was given as 383 acres.

The 1981 census recorded Hatwa as having a population of 500 people, in 102 households, and having an area of 163.89 hectares. The main staple foods were listed as wheat and rice.
