= Kalyanam =

Kalyanam may refer to:

Media

- Kalyanam (2009 TV series), a 2009 Indian Tamil-language soap opera
- Kalyanam (2016 TV series), a Singapore Tamil soap opera
- Kalyanam (film), a 2018 Indian Malayalam-language romantic-comedy film

Other

- the Hindu wedding ceremony
- Kalyanam, Delhi-based non-profit organization

== See also ==
- Kalyan (disambiguation)
- Kalyanamam Kalyanam (disambiguation)
