= Matrauli =

- Village
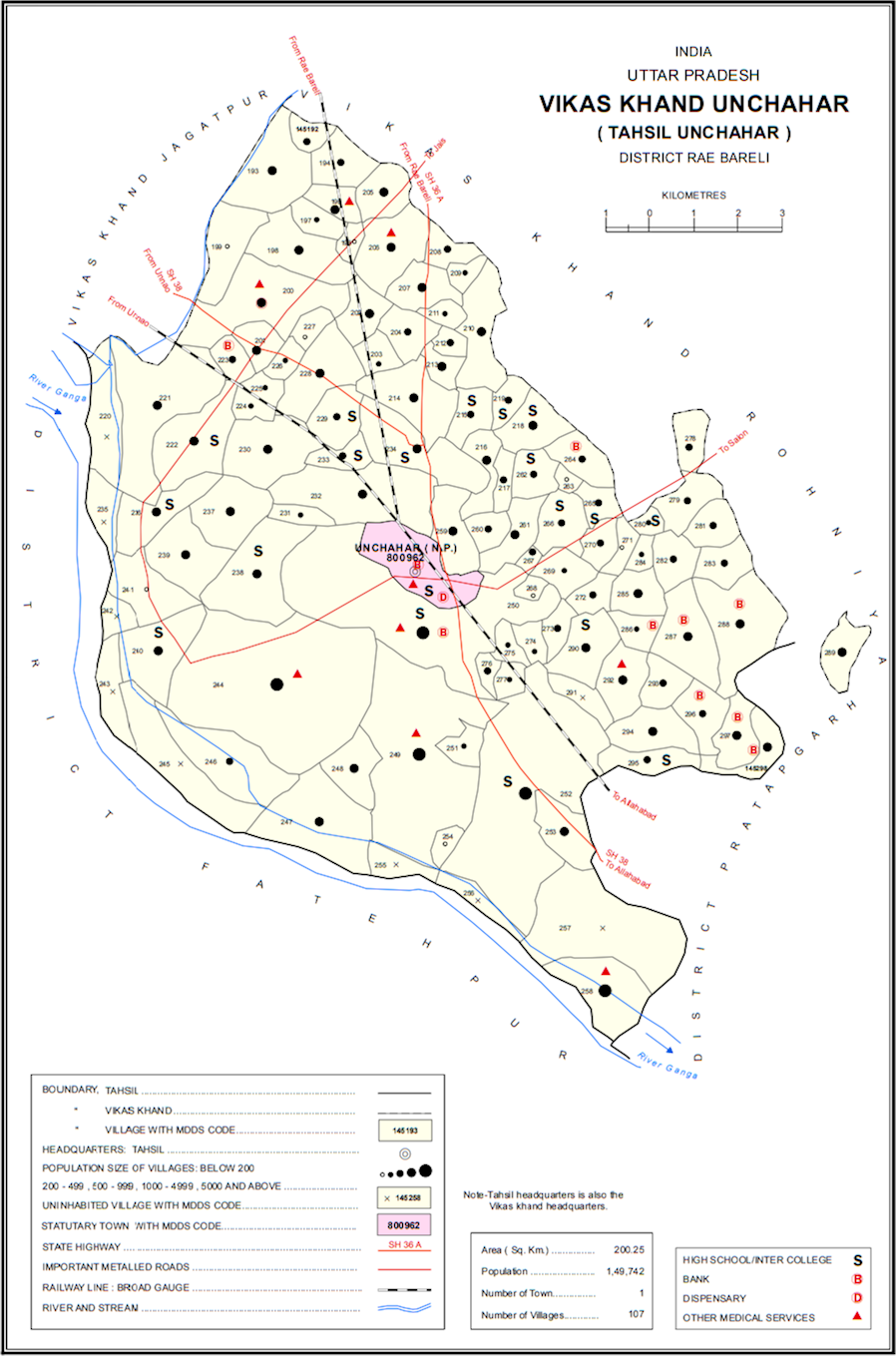
- Map showing Matrauli (#206) in Unchahar CD block

- Location in Uttar Pradesh, India
- Coordinates: 25.977399°N 81.280507°E
- Country India: India
- State: Uttar Pradesh
- District: Raebareli

Area
  - Total: 2.656 km^{2} (1.025 sq mi)

Population (2011)
  - Total: 4,105
  - Density: 1,546/km^{2} (4,003/sq mi)

Languages
  - Official: Hindi
- Time zone: UTC+5:30 (IST)
- Vehicle registration: UP-35

Matrauli is a village in Unchahar block of Raebareli district, Uttar Pradesh, India. It is located 30 km from Raebareli, the district headquarters. As of 2011, it has a population of 4,105 people, in 779 households.

The 1961 census recorded Matrauli as comprising 11 hamlets, with a total population of 1,151 people (609 male and 542 female), in 257 households and 253 physical houses. The area of the village was given as 636 acres.

The 1981 census recorded Matrauli (as "Matarauli") as having a population of 1,870 people, in 491 households, and having an area of 197.50 hectares. The main staple foods were listed as wheat and rice.
