= Kalyan, Pakistan =

Kalyan
- Location within Pakistan
- Coordinates: 31.17°N 74.27°E
- Country: Pakistan
- Province: Punjab
- District: Lahore
- Time zone: UTC+5 (PST)

Kalyan is a village of Kasur, District in the Punjab province of Pakistan. It is located to the south of the capital Lahore with an altitude of 208 metres.
