= Kalyani, Raebareli =

Kalyani Kalyāni
- Village
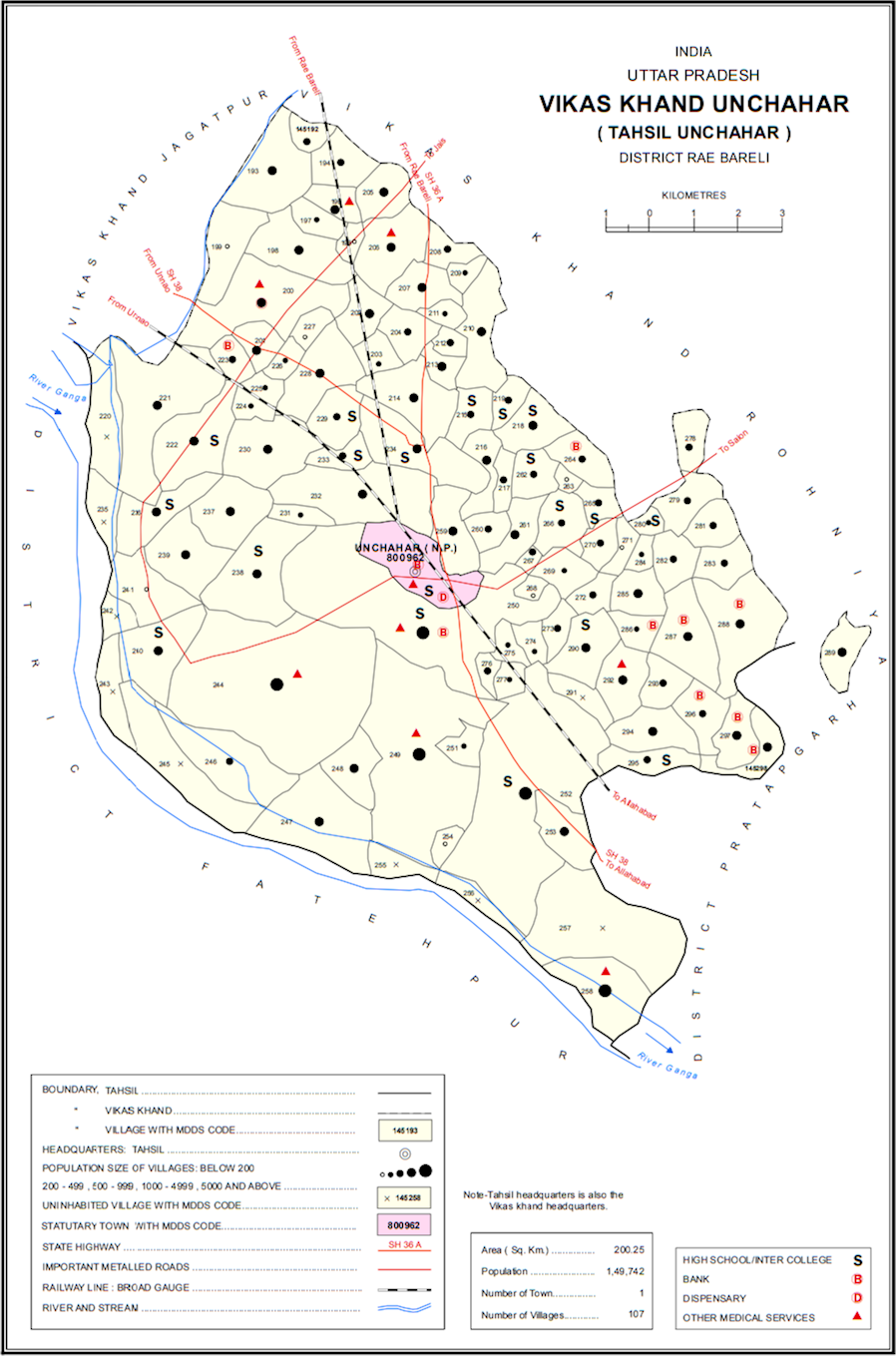
- Map showing Kalyani (#247) in Unchahar CD block

- Location in Uttar Pradesh, India
- Coordinates: 25.858234°N 81.272529°E
- Country India: India
- State: Uttar Pradesh
- District: Raebareli

Area
  - Total: 1.74 km^{2} (0.67 sq mi)

Population (2011)
  - Total: 1,681
  - Density: 966/km^{2} (2,500/sq mi)

Languages
  - Official: Hindi
- Time zone: UTC+5:30 (IST)
- Vehicle registration: UP-35

Kalyani is a village in Unchahar block of Raebareli district, Uttar Pradesh, India. It is located 44 km from Raebareli, the district headquarters. As of 2011, it has a population of 1,681 people, in 289 households. It has one primary school and no healthcare facilities.

The 1961 census recorded Kalyani as comprising 3 hamlets, with a total population of 427 people (221 male and 206 female), in 99 households and 99 physical houses. The area of the village was given as 430 acres.

The 1981 census recorded Kalyani as having a population of 679 people, in 141 households, and having an area of 174.01 hectares. The main staple foods were listed as wheat and rice.
