= List of Odia films of 1983 =

This is a list of films produced by the Ollywood film industry based in Bhubaneshwar and Cuttack in 1983:

== A-Z ==
Title	Director	Cast	Genre	Notes
1983
Aashar Akash	Gadadhar Putti	Bijaya Jena, Ajit Das		
Abhilasa	Sadhu Meher	Uttam Mohanty, Aparajita Mohanty, Sujata, Jaya Swami, Byomkesh Tripathi, Niranjan, Sadhu Meher	Drama	
Bhakta Salabega	Radha Panda	Uttam Mohanty		
Dekh Khabar Rakh Najar	Kumar Anand	Surendra Khuntia, Uttam Mohanty, Sriram Panda		
Jeebaku Debi Nahin	Nisith Bannerjee			
Jheeati Sita Pari	Bidhubhushan Nanda	Aparajita Mohanty		
Kalyani	Samiran Dutta	Hemant Das		
Maha Sati Savitri	Sona Mukherjee	Tapati Bhatacharya		
Ram Rahim	Sushil Mukherjee	Uttam Mohanty, Aparajita Mohanty, Tajudin Ahemad	Drama	
Subarna Sita	Sisir Misra	Shriram Panda		
Swapna Sagar	Prashanta Nanda	Prashanta Nanda, Shriram Panda, Mahasweta Roy, Anita Das		First 70mm film in Oriya
Udaya Bhanu	Surya Misra	Surya Misra, Gloria Mohanty		
