= Vezmeleh, Baneh =

Vezmeleh وزمله
- Village
- Location within Iran
- Coordinates: 35°58′17″N 46°05′30″E
- Country: Iran
- Province: Kurdistan
- County: Baneh
- Bakhsh: Nanur
- Rural District: Buin

Population (2006)
  - Total: 235
- Time zone: UTC+3:30 (IRST)
  - Summer (DST): UTC+4:30 (IRDT)

Vezmeleh (Persian: وزمله, also Romanized as Vezmaleh; also known as Vazmaleh Pahlavi Dezh, Vīzmālā, and Vīzmeleh) is a village in Buin Rural District, Nanur District, Baneh County, Kurdistan Province, Iran. At the 2006 census, its population was 235, in 34 families. The village is populated by Kurds.
