= Kolah Kabud, Kermanshah =

Kolah Kabud كلاه كبود
- Village
- Location within Iran
- Coordinates: 34°40′48″N 46°39′27″E
- Country: Iran
- Province: Kermanshah
- County: Ravansar
- Bakhsh: Central
- Rural District: Hasanabad

Population (2006)
  - Total: 233
- Time zone: UTC+3:30 (IRST)
  - Summer (DST): UTC+4:30 (IRDT)

Kolah Kabud (Persian: كلاه كبود, also Romanized as Kolāh Kabūd) is a village in Hasanabad Rural District, in the Central District of Ravansar County, Kermanshah Province, Iran. At the 2006 census, its population was 233, in 47 families.
