= Vezmeleh, Saqqez =

Vezmeleh وزمله
- Village
- Location within Iran
- Coordinates: 36°10′16″N 45°59′13″E
- Country: Iran
- Province: Kurdistan
- County: Saqqez
- Bakhsh: Central
- Rural District: Mir Deh

Population (2006)
  - Total: 253
- Time zone: UTC+3:30 (IRST)
  - Summer (DST): UTC+4:30 (IRDT)

Vezmeleh (Persian: وزمله, also Romanized as Vozmaleh) is a village in Mir Deh Rural District, in the Central District of Saqqez County, Kurdistan Province, Iran. At the 2006 census, its population was 253, in 45 families. The village is populated by Kurds.
