= Razianeh Kari =

Razianeh Kari رازیانه کاری
- Village
- Location within Iran
- Coordinates: 30°01′41″N 51°33′18″E
- Country: Iran
- Province: Fars
- County: Mamasani
- Bakhsh: Central
- Rural District: Bakesh-e Yek

Population (2006)
  - Total: 1,052
- Time zone: UTC+3:30 (IRST)
  - Summer (DST): UTC+4:30 (IRDT)

Razianeh Kari (Persian: رازیانه کاری, also Romanized as Rāzīāneh Kārī; also known as Rāyjānkārī and Rāzīān-e Kārī) is a village in Bakesh-e Yek Rural District, in the Central District of Mamasani County, Fars province, Iran. At the 2006 census, its population was 1,052, in 237 families.
