= Bilavar District =

District in Kermanshah province, Iran

Bilavar District Persian: بخش بیلوار
- District
- Location within Iran
- Coordinates: 34°41′06″N 47°01′19″E
- Country: Iran
- Province: Kermanshah
- County: Kermanshah
- Capital: Qaleh

Population (2016)
  - Total: 17,069
- Time zone: UTC+3:30 (IRST)

Bilavar District (Persian: بخش بیلوار) is in Kermanshah County, Kermanshah province, Iran. Its capital is the city of Qaleh.

== History ==
After the 2006 National Census, Posht Darband and Razavar Rural Districts were separated from the Central District in the formation of Bilavar District. After the 2016 census, the village of Qaleh was elevated to the status of a city.

== Demographics ==
=== Population ===
At the time of the 2011 census, the district's population was18,605 people in 5,006 households. The 2016 census measured the population of the district as 17,069 inhabitants in 4,979 households.

=== Administrative divisions ===
Bilavar District Population
Administrative Divisions	2011	2016
Posht Darband RD	10,363	9,080
Razavar RD	8,242	7,989
Qaleh (city) (Note: Became a city after the 2016 census)		
Total	18,605	17,069
RD = Rural District
