= Feroze Gandhi Unchahar Thermal Power Station =

Thermal power plant in Raebareli, India

Feroze Gandhi Unchahar Thermal Power Plant
- Country: India
- Location: Unchahar, Raebareli, Uttar Pradesh
- Coordinates: 25°54′52″N 81°19′36″E
- Status: Operational
- Commission date: 1988
- Operator: NTPC

Thermal power station
- Primary fuel: Coal

Power generation
- Units operational: 5
- Nameplate capacity: 1560.00 MW

External links
- Website: www.ntpc.co.in/power-generation/coal-based-power-stations/unchahar

Feroze Gandhi Unchahar Thermal Power Plant is located at Unchahar in Raebareli district in Indian state of Uttar Pradesh. The power plant is one of the coal based power plants of NTPC Limited. In the year 1992, Uttar Pradesh State Electricity Board (U.P.S.E.B.) transferred Unchahar Thermal Power Station to NTPC Limited against payment overdue and later on renamed it to Feroze Gandhi Unchahar Thermal Power Plant by NTPC Limited.

== Description ==
Feroze Gandhi Unchahar Thermal Power Plant has an installed capacity of 1,550 megawatts (2,080,000 hp), inclusive of Fourth Stage, that got operational in April 2017. The First unit was commissioned in November 1988. The coal for the plant is derived from North Karanpura Coalfield. The water source is from Sarda Sahyak Canal.

=== Installed capacity ===
Stage	Unit Number	Installed Capacity (MW)	Date of Commissioning	Status
First	1	210	1988 November	Running
First	2	210	1989 March	Running
Second	3	210	1999 January	Running
Second	4	210	1999 October	Running
Third	5	210	2006 September	Running
Fourth & Solar	6	500 ,10	2017 April	Running

== 2017 Boiler explosion ==
A massive explosion ripped a boiler at National Thermal Power Limited (NTPC) Unchahar plant in Uttar Pradesh’s Rae Bareli district on Wednesday, 1 November 2017, killing at least 25 people and injuring nearly 100. The casualties have risen to 32 by Friday. Doctors warned the toll was likely to rise as more than a dozen contractual laborers were battling for life with more than 90 percent burn wounds.

In what is one of the worst industrial disasters in eight years (after Jaipur's Indian Oil fire in 2009), local emergency response was overwhelmed with the scale of disaster. Help was sought from neighboring town and cities including Lucknow and Allahabad. Almost all the injured have been transferred to hospitals in state capital, Lucknow for better treatment.
