= Newada, Raebareli =

Newada Newāda
- Village
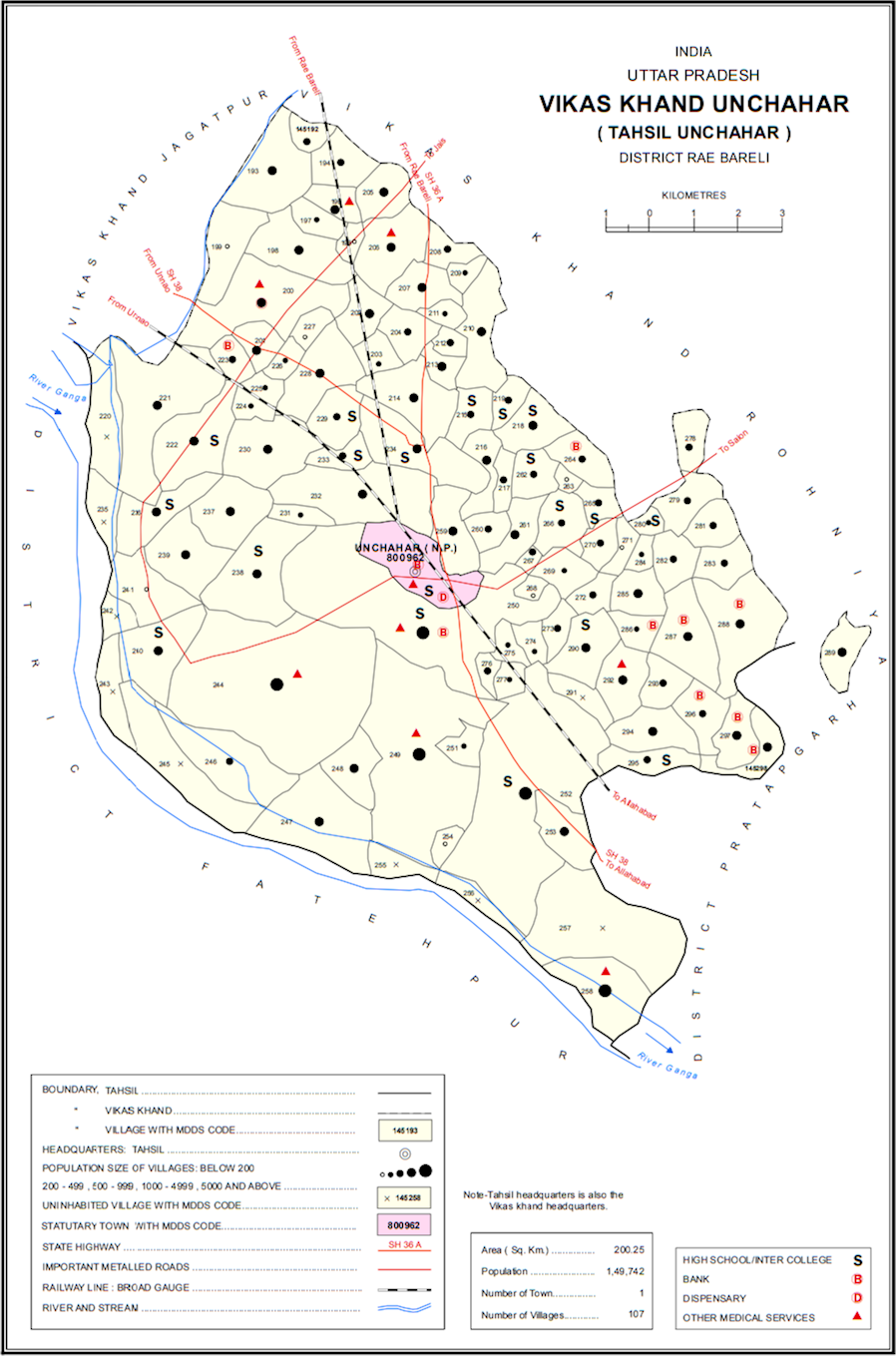
- Map showing Newada (#208) in Unchahar CD block

- Location in Uttar Pradesh, India
- Coordinates: 25.979826°N 81.29371°E
- Country India: India
- State: Uttar Pradesh
- District: Raebareli

Area
  - Total: 1.205 km^{2} (0.465 sq mi)

Population (2011)
  - Total: 814
  - Density: 676/km^{2} (1,750/sq mi)

Languages
  - Official: Hindi
- Time zone: UTC+5:30 (IST)
- Vehicle registration: UP-35

Newada is a village in Unchahar block of Raebareli district, Uttar Pradesh, India. It is located 29 km from Raebareli, the district headquarters. As of 2011, it has a population of 814 people, in 137 households.

The 1961 census recorded Newada as comprising 2 hamlets, with a total population of 369 people (189 male and 190 female), in 77 households and 72 physical houses. The area of the village was given as 149 acres.

The 1981 census recorded Newada as having a population of 427 people, in 105 households, and having an area of 57.17 hectares. The main staple foods were listed as wheat and rice.
