= Razavar Rural District =

Rural district in province, Iran

Razavar Rural District Persian: دهستان رازآور
- Rural District
- Location within Iran
- Coordinates: 34°42′19″N 46°55′07″E
- Country: Iran
- Province: Kermanshah
- County: Kermanshah
- District: Bilavar
- Capital: Qaleh

Population (2016)
  - Total: 7,989
- Time zone: UTC+3:30 (IRST)

Razavar Rural District (Persian: دهستان رازآور) is in Bilavar District of Kermanshah County, Kermanshah province, Iran. It is administered from the city of Qaleh.

== Demographics ==
=== Population ===
At the time of the 2006 National Census, the rural district's population (as a part of the Central District) was 8,248 in 1,871 households. There were 8,242 inhabitants in 2,219 households at the following census of 2011, by which time the rural district had been separated from the district in the formation of Bilavar District. The 2016 census measured the population of the rural district as 7,989 in 2,280 households. The most populous of its 25 villages was Qaleh (now a city), with 1,130 people.
