= Posht Darband Rural District =

Rural district in Kermanshah province, Iran

Posht Darband Rural District Persian: دهستان پشت دربند
- Rural District
- Location within Iran
- Coordinates: 34°41′04″N 47°08′00″E
- Country: Iran
- Province: Kermanshah
- County: Kermanshah
- District: Bilavar
- Capital: Marzbani

Population (2016)
  - Total: 9,080
- Time zone: UTC+3:30 (IRST)

Posht Darband Rural District (Persian: دهستان پشت دربند) is in Bilavar District of Kermanshah County, Kermanshah province, Iran. Its capital is the village of Marzbani.

== Demographics ==
=== Population ===
At the time of the 2006 National Census, the rural district's population (as a part of the Central District) was 11,168 in 2,600 households. There were 10,363 inhabitants in 2,787 households at the following census of 2011, by which time the rural district had been separated from the district in the formation of Bilavar District. The 2016 census measured the population of the rural district as 9,080 in 2,699 households. The most populous of its 48 villages was Razin, with 952 people.
