= Miyan Darband Rural District =

Rural district in Kermanshah province, Iran

Miyan Darband Rural District Persian: دهستان ميان دربند
- Rural District
- Location within Iran
- Coordinates: 34°32′50″N 47°00′32″E
- Country: Iran
- Province: Kermanshah
- County: Kermanshah
- District: Central
- Capital: Qazanchi

Population (2016)
  - Total: 22,452
- Time zone: UTC+3:30 (IRST)

Miyan Darband Rural District (Persian: دهستان ميان دربند) is in the Central District of Kermanshah County, Kermanshah province, Iran. Its capital is the village of Qazanchi.

== Demographics ==
=== Population ===
At the time of the 2006 National Census, the rural district's population was 26,915 in 6,259 households. There were 31,091 inhabitants in 8,287 households at the following census of 2011. The 2016 census measured the population of the rural district as 22,452 in 5,943 households. The most populous of its 109 villages was Qazanchi, with 2,755 people.
