= Kermanshah County =

County in Kermanshah province, Iran

Kermanshah County Persian: شهرستان کرمانشاه
- County
- Location of Kermanshah County in Kermanshah province (center, pink)

- Location of Kermanshah province in Iran
- Coordinates: 34°17′N 46°58′E
- Country: Iran
- Province: Kermanshah
- Capital: Kermanshah
- Districts: Central, Bilavar, Firuzabad, Kuzaran, Mahidasht

Population (2016)
  - Total: 1,083,833
- Time zone: UTC+3:30 (IRST)

Kermanshah County (Persian: شهرستان کرمانشاه) is in Kermanshah province, Iran. Its capital is the city of Kermanshah. (Note: Formerly Bakhtaran (باختران))

== History ==
After the 2006 National Census, Posht Darband and Razavar Rural Districts were separated from the Central District in the formation of Bilavar District. After the 2016 census, the village of Qaleh was elevated to the status of a city.

== Demographics ==
=== Religion ===
A majority in Kermanshah are Shia Muslims, with minorities of Sunni Muslims and believers of Yarsanism.

=== Population ===
At the time of the 2006 census, the county's population was 950,400 in 235,408 households. The following census in 2011 counted 1,030,978 people in 288,260 households. The 2016 census measured the population of the county as 1,083,833 in 323,291 households.

=== Administrative divisions ===
Kermanshah County's population history and administrative structure over three consecutive censuses are shown in the following table.

Kermanshah County Population
Administrative Divisions	2006	2011	2016
Central District	888,990	951,762	1,011,428
Bala Darband RD	17,483	18,373	10,937
Dorudfaraman RD	29,608	36,550	24,165
Miyan Darband RD	26,915	31,091	22,452
Posht Darband RD	11,168		
Qarah Su RD	10,966	14,343	7,223
Razavar RD	8,248		
Kermanshah (city)	784,602	851,405	946,651
Bilavar District		18,605	17,069
Posht Darband RD		10,363	9,080
Razavar RD		8,242	7,989
Qaleh (city) (Note: Became a city after the 2016 census)			
Firuzabad District	24,849	25,255	21,197
Jalalvand RD	6,448	5,619	4,674
Osmanvand RD	4,654	4,718	4,405
Sar Firuzabad RD	13,290	14,149	11,314
Halashi (city)	457	769	804
Kuzaran District	15,162	14,465	13,682
Haft Ashiyan RD	1,828	1,628	1,444
Sanjabi RD	9,575	8,903	8,231
Kuzaran (city)	3,759	3,934	4,007
Mahidasht District	21,399	20,402	18,628
Chaqa Narges RD	7,296	6,507	6,098
Mahidasht RD	13,107	12,955	11,707
Robat (city)	996	940	823
Total	950,400	1,030,978	1,083,833
RD = Rural District

== See also ==
Media related to Kermanshah County at Wikimedia Commons
