= Central District (Kermanshah County) =

District in Kermanshah province, Iran

Central District (Kermanshah County) Persian: بخش مرکزی شهرستان کرمانشاه
- District
- Location within Iran
- Coordinates: 34°23′10″N 47°04′06″E
- Country: Iran
- Province: Kermanshah
- County: Kermanshah
- Capital: Kermanshah

Population (2016)
  - Total: 1,011,428
- Time zone: UTC+3:30 (IRST)

The Central District of Kermanshah County (Persian: بخش مرکزی شهرستان کرمانشاه) is in Kermanshah province, Iran. Its capital is the city of Kermanshah.

== History ==
After the 2006 National Census, Posht Darband and Razavar Rural Districts were separated from the district in the formation of Bilavar District.

== Demographics ==
=== Population ===
At the time of the 2006 census, the district's population was 888,990 in 222,022 households. The following census in 2011 counted 951,762 people in 268,312 households. The 2016 census measured the population of the district as 1,011,428 inhabitants in 302,960 households.

=== Administrative divisions ===
Central District (Kermanshah County) Population
Administrative Divisions	2006	2011	2016
Bala Darband RD	17,483	18,373	10,937
Dorudfaraman RD	29,608	36,550	24,165
Miyan Darband RD	26,915	31,091	22,452
Posht Darband RD (Note: Transferred to Bilavar District)	11,168		
Qarah Su RD	10,966	14,343	7,223
Razavar RD	8,248		
Kermanshah (city)	784,602	851,405	946,651
Total	888,990	951,762	1,011,428
RD = Rural District
