= Shiraz (disambiguation) =

Shiraz is a city in Iran.

Shiraz may also refer to:

== Places ==
- Shiraz (electoral district), a constituency for the Islamic Consultative Assembly
- Shiraz, East Azerbaijan, a village in Iran
- Shiraz County, an administrative subdivision of Iran
- Vosketap, Armenia, formerly called Shiraz

== People ==
- Hovhannes Shiraz (1915–1984), Armenian poet
- Ara Shiraz (1941–2014), Armenian sculptor
- Estee Shiraz, American-Israeli entrepreneur, communication expert and mediator
- Sipan Shiraz (1967–1997), Armenian poet
- Shiraz Ali (born 1934), former Bermudian cricketer
- Shiraz Minwalla (born 1973), Indian string theorist
- Shiraz Shariff (born 1954), Indo-Canadian politician from Alberta, Canada
- Shiraz Shivji (born 1947), Indian-American computer designer
- Shiraz Sumar (born 1950), Indian-Tanzanian cricketer who played for East Africa
- Shiraz Tal (born 1974), Israeli model and actor
- Ghalib Shiraz Dhalla (born 1978), Indian-American writer
- Shiraz (singer) (born 1983), Lebanese singer

== Others ==
- Shiraz (band), a South African group from the 1980s
- Shiraz (film), a 1928 silent film about the Taj Mahal directed by Franz Osten
- Shiraz (grape), a synonym for the syrah variety
- Shiraz, another name for the Lahore pigeon breed
- Shiraz University, Shiraz, Iran
- Shiraz wine, produced around the town of Shiraz, Iran
- Shiraz, another name for the Persian cat breed
- Shiraz (Vivier), a piano piece by Claude Vivier

== See also ==
- Shirazi (disambiguation)
