= Kahrar =

Kahrar (Persian: كهرار), also rendered as Qahrar, may refer to:

- Kahrar-e Dejgah
- Kahrar-e Mowqufeh
- Kahrar-e Olya
- Kahrar-e Sofla
