= Shirazi =

Shirazi (Persian: شیرازی) an adjective meaning from "Shiraz" a city in Iran (Persia), may refer to:

== People ==
- Demonym for Shiraz, a city in southwestern Iran
- Shirazi people, a subgroup of the Swahili people inhabiting the Swahili Coast
- Abu Ishaq al-Shirazi (1003–1083), a leading Shafi'i scholar who was the first teacher at the Nizamiyya of Baghdad
- Qutb al-Din al-Shirazi (1236–1311), Persian polymath
- Abdullah Musawi Shirazi (1892–1984), Iranian Grand Ayatollah
- Ali Sayad Shirazi (1944–1999), Iranian general of the Iran-Iraq War
- Hasan al-Shirazi (1935–1980), Iranian-Iraqi Ayatollah, and activist
- Kamran Shirazi (born 1952), Iranian International Chess Master
- Lutfullah Khan Shirazi, Mughal faujdar of Kamrup and Sylhet
- Mirza Muhammad-Hassan Shirazi (1815–1895), Iranian-Iraqi grand Ayatollah widely known for his 1891 verdict against the usage of tobacco
- Mohammad Shirazi (general) (died 2026), Iranian military officer
- Muhammad al-Shirazi (1928–2001), Iranian-Iraqi grand Ayatollah, and author
- Muhammad-Ridha al-Shirazi (1958–2008), Iranian-Iraqi Ayatollah
- Bagher Shirazi (1936–2007), Iranian-Iraqi professor and architect
- Mu'ayyad fi'l-Din al-Shirazi (1000–1078), 11th-century Persian Isma'ili scholar
- Mujtaba al-Shirazi (born 1943), Iranian-Iraqi Ayatollah
- Naser Makarem Shirazi (born 1924), Iranian grand Ayatollah
- Nitzan Shirazi (1971–2014), Israeli footballer and manager
- Sadr al-Din Muhammad al-Shirazi or Mulla Sadra (1571–1636), Persian philosopher and theologian
- Sadiq al-Shirazi (born 1942), Iranian-Iraqi grand Ayatollah
- Shlomo Shirazi (born 1960), Israeli football defender
- Razi Shirazi (born 1927), Iranian-Iraqi grand Ayatollah
- Báb (Sayyid `Alí Muḥammad Shírází, 1819–1850), founder of Bábism and a central figure in the Bahá'í Faith
- Firuzabadi, also known as Abu Tahir Majid al-Din Muhammad ibn Ya'qub ibn Muhammad ibn Ibrahim al-Shirizi al-Fairuzabadi

== Places ==
- Shirazi, Kenya
- Shirazi, Iran
- Shirazi-ye Olya, Iran
- Shirazi-ye Sofla, Iran
- Shirazi-ye Vosta, Iran

== Other uses ==
- Shirazi, another name for the Lahore pigeon breed
- Shirazi era, a mythic origin in the history of Southeast Africa
- Shirazi salad, an Iranian salad
- Shirazi, another name for the Persian cat breed

== See also ==
- Shiraz (disambiguation)
