= Qurbaghestan =

Qurbaghestan (Persian: قورباغستان), also rendered as Qorbaghestan or Qarabghestan or Qarbaghastan or Qarbaghestan or Gherbaghestan or Gurbaghistan may refer to:

- Qurbaghestan-e Olya
- Qurbaghestan-e Sofla
