= Kanjur, Iran =

Kanjur (Persian: كنجور) in Iran may refer to:

- Kanjur-e Olya
- Kanjur-e Sofla
