= Dashtelah =

Dashtelah (Persian: دشتله) may refer to:

- Dashtelah-ye Olya
- Dashtelah-ye Sofla
