= Gavshan =

Gavshan (Persian: گاوشان) may refer to:

- Gavshan-e Olya
- Gavshan-e Sofla
