= Nirevand =

Nirevand نيروند
- Village
- Location within Iran
- Coordinates: 34°10′57″N 47°14′11″E
- Country: Iran
- Province: Kermanshah
- County: Kermanshah
- Bakhsh: Central
- Rural District: Qarah Su

Population (2006)
  - Total: 62
- Time zone: UTC+3:30 (IRST)
  - Summer (DST): UTC+4:30 (IRDT)

Nirevand (Persian: نيروند, also Romanized as Nīrevand) is a village in Qarah Su Rural District, in the Central District of Kermanshah County, Kermanshah Province, Iran. At the 2006 census, its population was 62, in 13 families.
