= Varva =

Varva may refer to:

- Varva, Iran
- Varva, Ukraine
- Varva, Reidgotaland
