= Poshteh Kash =

Poshteh Kash پشته كش
- Village
- Location within Iran
- Coordinates: 34°16′30″N 47°05′06″E
- Country: Iran
- Province: Kermanshah
- County: Kermanshah
- Bakhsh: Central
- Rural District: Qarah Su

Population (2006)
  - Total: 306
- Time zone: UTC+3:30 (IRST)
  - Summer (DST): UTC+4:30 (IRDT)

Poshteh Kash (Persian: پشته كش) is a village in Qarah Su Rural District, in the Central District of Kermanshah County, Kermanshah Province, Iran. At the 2006 census, its population was 306, in 66 families.
