= Siyaban =

Siyaban سيابان
- Village
- Location within Iran
- Coordinates: 34°12′52″N 47°12′16″E
- Country: Iran
- Province: Kermanshah
- County: Kermanshah
- Bakhsh: Central
- Rural District: Qarah Su

Population (2006)
  - Total: 125
- Time zone: UTC+3:30 (IRST)
  - Summer (DST): UTC+4:30 (IRDT)

Siyaban (Persian: سيابان, also Romanized as Sīyābān) is a village in Qarah Su Rural District, in the Central District of Kermanshah County, Kermanshah Province, Iran. At the 2006 census, its population was 125, in 27 families.
