= Sirazi =

Sirazi may refer to:

- something of, from or related to the Siraz region of northern India
- Sirazi language, an Indo-Aryan language
- Širāzi, an alternative spelling for Shirazi
