= Shirazi-ye Vosta =

Shirazi-ye Vosta شيرازي وسطي
- Village
- Location within Iran
- Coordinates: 34°06′53″N 47°24′40″E
- Country: Iran
- Province: Kermanshah
- County: Kermanshah
- Bakhsh: Central
- Rural District: Qarah Su

Population (2006)
  - Total: 24
- Time zone: UTC+3:30 (IRST)
  - Summer (DST): UTC+4:30 (IRDT)

Shirazi-ye Vosta (Persian: شيرازي وسطي, also Romanized as Shīrāzī-ye Vosţá; also known as Shīrāzī-ye Babrī) is a village in Qarah Su Rural District, in the Central District of Kermanshah County, Kermanshah Province, Iran. At the 2006 census, its population was 24, in 4 families.
