= Gavshan-e Sofla =

Gavshan-e Sofla گاوشان سفلي
- Village
- Location within Iran
- Coordinates: 34°12′59″N 47°12′31″E
- Country: Iran
- Province: Kermanshah
- County: Kermanshah
- Bakhsh: Central
- Rural District: Qarah Su

Population (2006)
  - Total: 103
- Time zone: UTC+3:30 (IRST)
  - Summer (DST): UTC+4:30 (IRDT)

Gavshan-e Sofla (Persian: گاوشان سفلي, also Romanized as Gāvshān-e Soflá; also known as Gāvshān-e Pā'īn) is a village in Qarah Su Rural District, in the Central District of Kermanshah County, Kermanshah Province, Iran. At the 2006 census, its population was 103, in 25 families.
