= Gavshan-e Olya =

Gavshan-e Olya گاوشان عليا
- Village
- Location within Iran
- Coordinates: 34°12′53″N 47°12′14″E
- Country: Iran
- Province: Kermanshah
- County: Kermanshah
- Bakhsh: Central
- Rural District: Qarah Su

Population (2006)
  - Total: 176
- Time zone: UTC+3:30 (IRST)
  - Summer (DST): UTC+4:30 (IRDT)

Gavshan-e Olya (Persian: گاوشان عليا, also Romanized as Gāvshān-e ‘Olyā; also known as Gāvshān-e Bālā) is a village in Qarah Su Rural District, in the Central District of Kermanshah County, Kermanshah Province, Iran. At the 2006 census, its population was 176, in 38 families.
