= Dashtelah-ye Sofla =

Dashtelah-ye Sofla دشتله سفلي
- Village
- Location within Iran
- Coordinates: 34°11′44″N 47°17′52″E
- Country: Iran
- Province: Kermanshah
- County: Kermanshah
- Bakhsh: Central
- Rural District: Qarah Su

Population (2006)
  - Total: 57
- Time zone: UTC+3:30 (IRST)
  - Summer (DST): UTC+4:30 (IRDT)

Dashtelah-ye Sofla (Persian: دشتله سفلي, also Romanized as Dashtelah-ye Soflá) is a village in Qarah Su Rural District, in the Central District of Kermanshah County, Kermanshah Province, Iran. At the 2006 census, its population was 57, in 13 families.
