= Kahrar-e Mowqufeh =

Kahrar-e Mowqufeh كهرارموقوفه
- Village
- Location within Iran
- Coordinates: 34°11′17″N 47°12′55″E
- Country: Iran
- Province: Kermanshah
- County: Kermanshah
- Bakhsh: Central
- Rural District: Qarah Su

Population (2006)
  - Total: 215
- Time zone: UTC+3:30 (IRST)
  - Summer (DST): UTC+4:30 (IRDT)

Kahrar-e Mowqufeh (Persian: كهرارموقوفه, also Romanized as Kahrār-e Mowqūfeh; also known as Qahrār-e Mowqūfeh) is a village in Qarah Su Rural District, in the Central District of Kermanshah County, Kermanshah Province, Iran. At the 2006 census, its population was 215, in 45 families.
