= Kanjur-e Olya =

Kanjur-e Olya كنجورعليا
- Village
- Location within Iran
- Coordinates: 34°14′39″N 47°11′27″E
- Country: Iran
- Province: Kermanshah
- County: Kermanshah
- Bakhsh: Central
- Rural District: Qarah Su

Population (2006)
  - Total: 148
- Time zone: UTC+3:30 (IRST)
  - Summer (DST): UTC+4:30 (IRDT)

Kanjur-e Olya (Persian: كنجورعليا, also Romanized as Kanjūr-e ‘Olyā; also known as Kanjūr and Kanjūr-e Bālā) is a village in Qarah Su Rural District, in the Central District of Kermanshah County, Kermanshah Province, Iran. At the 2006 census, its population was 148, in 27 families.
