= Chub Deraz =

Village in Kermanshah province, Iran

Chub Deraz Persian: چوبدراز
- Village
- Location within Iran
- Coordinates: 34°15′17″N 47°10′28″E
- Country: Iran
- Province: Kermanshah
- County: Kermanshah
- District: Central
- Rural District: Qarah Su

Population (2016)
  - Total: 371
- Time zone: UTC+3:30 (IRST)

Chub Deraz (Persian: چوبدراز) (Note: Also romanized as Chūb Derāz) is a village in Qarah Su Rural District of the Central District of Kermanshah County, Kermanshah province, Iran.

== Demographics ==
=== Population ===
At the time of the 2006 National Census, the village's population was 376 in 74 households. The following census in 2011 counted 364 people in 80 households. The 2016 census measured the population of the village as 371 people in 80 households. It was the most populous village in its rural district.
