= Varva, Iran =

Varva وروا
- Village
- Location within Iran
- Coordinates: 34°12′01″N 47°14′42″E
- Country: Iran
- Province: Kermanshah
- County: Kermanshah
- Bakhsh: Central
- Rural District: Qarah Su

Population (2006)
  - Total: 117
- Time zone: UTC+3:30 (IRST)
  - Summer (DST): UTC+4:30 (IRDT)

Varva (Persian: وروا, also Romanized as Varvā) is a village in Qarah Su Rural District, in the Central District of Kermanshah County, Kermanshah Province, Iran. At the 2006 census, its population was 117, in 27 families.
