= Qurbaghestan-e Olya =

Village in Kermanshah, Iran

Qurbaghestan-e Olya قورباغستان عليا
- Village
- Location within Iran
- Coordinates: 34°14′17″N 47°11′56″E
- Country: Iran
- Province: Kermanshah
- County: Kermanshah
- Bakhsh: Central
- Rural District: Qarah Su

Population (2006)
  - Total: 160
- Time zone: UTC+3:30 (IRST)
  - Summer (DST): UTC+4:30 (IRDT)

Qurbaghestan-e Olya (Persian: قورباغستان عليا, also Romanized as Qurbāghestān-e ‘Olyā; also known as Gherbaghestan, Gurbāghistān, Qarabāghestān-e Bālā, Qarbāghastān-e Bālā, Qorbāghestān, Qorbāghestān-e Bālā, and Qorbāghestān-e ‘Olyā) is a village in Qarah Su Rural District, in the Central District of Kermanshah County, Kermanshah Province, Iran. At the 2006 census, its population was 160, in 32 families.
