= Kahrar-e Sofla =

Kahrar-e Sofla كهرارسفلي
- Village
- Location within Iran
- Coordinates: 34°12′25″N 47°13′48″E
- Country: Iran
- Province: Kermanshah
- County: Kermanshah
- Bakhsh: Central
- Rural District: Qarah Su

Population (2006)
  - Total: 350
- Time zone: UTC+3:30 (IRST)
  - Summer (DST): UTC+4:30 (IRDT)

Kahrar-e Sofla (Persian: كهرارسفلي, also Romanized as Kahrār-e Soflá; also known as Kahrār and Qahrār-e Pā’īn) is a village in Qarah Su Rural District, in the Central District of Kermanshah County, Kermanshah Province, Iran. At the 2006 census, its population was 350, in 75 families.
