= Qurbaghestan-e Sofla =

Village in Kermanshah, Iran

Qurbaghestan-e Sofla قورباغستان سفلي
- Village
- Location within Iran
- Coordinates: 34°14′52″N 47°13′20″E
- Country: Iran
- Province: Kermanshah
- County: Kermanshah
- Bakhsh: Central
- Rural District: Qarah Su

Population (2006)
  - Total: 301
- Time zone: UTC+3:30 (IRST)
  - Summer (DST): UTC+4:30 (IRDT)

Qurbaghestan-e Sofla (Persian: قورباغستان سفلي, also Romanized as Qūrbāghestān-e Soflá; also known as Gherbaghestané Soflá, Gurbaghistan, Qarabāghestān-e Pā’īn, Qarbaghastān-e Pā’īn, Qarbāghestān-e Pā’īn, Qorbāghestān, and Qorbāghestān-e Pā’īn) is a village in Qarah Su Rural District, in the Central District of Kermanshah County, Kermanshah Province, Iran. At the 2006 census, its population was 301, in 62 families.
