= Kanjur-e Sofla =

Kanjur-e Sofla كنجورسفلي
- Village
- Location within Iran
- Coordinates: 34°15′14″N 47°11′55″E
- Country: Iran
- Province: Kermanshah
- County: Kermanshah
- Bakhsh: Central
- Rural District: Qarah Su

Population (2006)
  - Total: 298
- Time zone: UTC+3:30 (IRST)
  - Summer (DST): UTC+4:30 (IRDT)

Kanjur-e Sofla (Persian: كنجورسفلي, also Romanized as Kanjūr-e Soflá; also known as Ganjūr-e Pā’īn, Kanjūr, and Kanjūr-e Pā’īn) is a village in Qarah Su Rural District, in the Central District of Kermanshah County, Kermanshah Province, Iran. At the 2006 census, its population was 298, in 65 families.
