= Hovhannes Shiraz House-Museum =

- Հովհաննես Շիրազի տուն-թանգարան
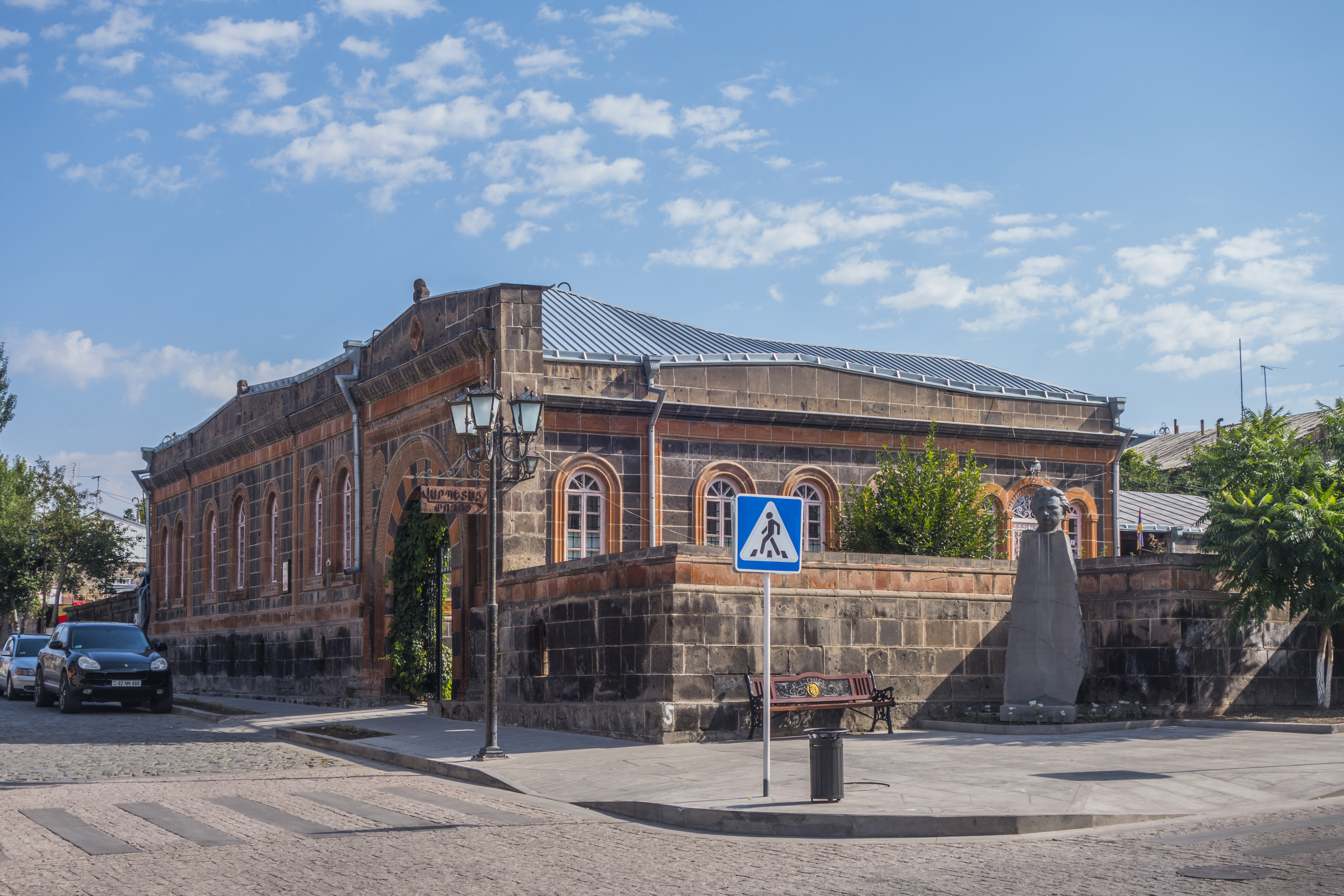
- Established: 2003
- Location: Gyumri, Armenia
- Coordinates: 40°47′16″N 43°50′35″E
- Type: Museum
- Director: Ara Papanyan
- Website: www.shiraz.am/en/

The Hovhannes Shiraz House-Museum (Armenian: Հովհաննես Շիրազի տուն-թանգարան) was founded in 1983 in the Kumayri historic district of Gyumri, Armenia, and opened in 2003. The museum is devoted to the exhibition and preservation of the Armenian poet Hovhannes Shiraz's personal belongings, manuscripts and works.

The building was built in 1886 using red tuff stone from the Shirak province, and was the home of a wealthy merchant named Qeshishyan. Shiraz only lived in this house for the year before his March 1984 death.

In order to preserve his legacy, the building later became a house-museum by a resolution of the Government of Armenia. The 1988 Armenian earthquake interrupted the museum's refurbishment but today, the western facade has a luxurious gate that leads to a large courtyard. The museum consists of six rooms. The first presents information about the poet's childhood. The second room is furnished as it was during Shiraz's lifetime. The other four rooms house the author's creative works, paintings, sculptures, etc. On display is a painting by the American author John Steinbeck, thanking Shiraz for his hospitality in Yerevan.

The House-Museum is located on 101 Varpetats Street, Gyumri, 3104, Armenia.

In 2024, in honor of the events dedicated to the 110th anniversary of Hovhannes Shiraz, the fund of the Hovhannes Shiraz Memorial House-Museum in Gyumri received new exhibits. Shirak State University donated archival documents to the museum, including orders from Leninakan Pedagogical Institute from 1935-1936 concerning the student Hovhannes Shiraz.

== Gallery ==
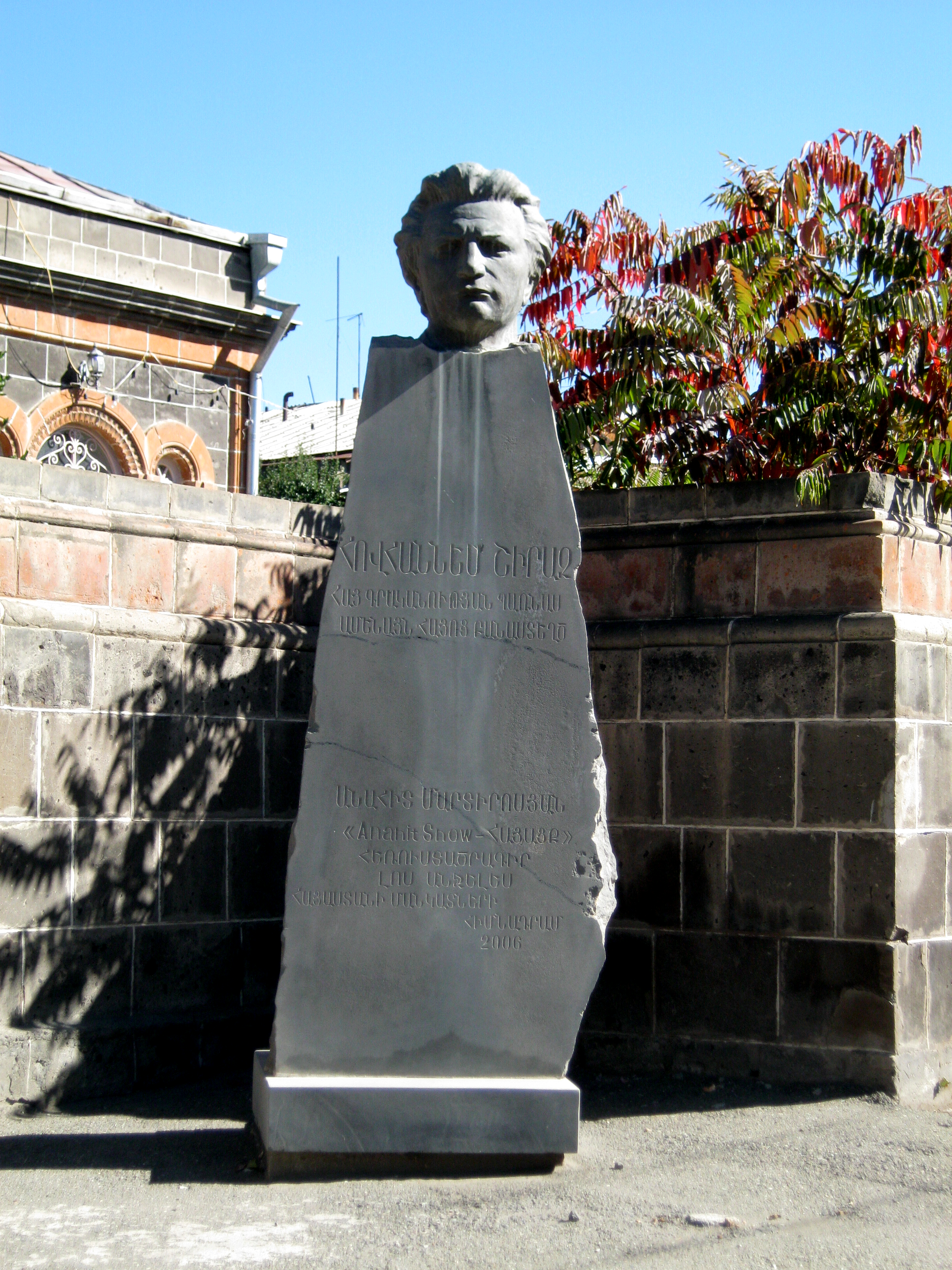

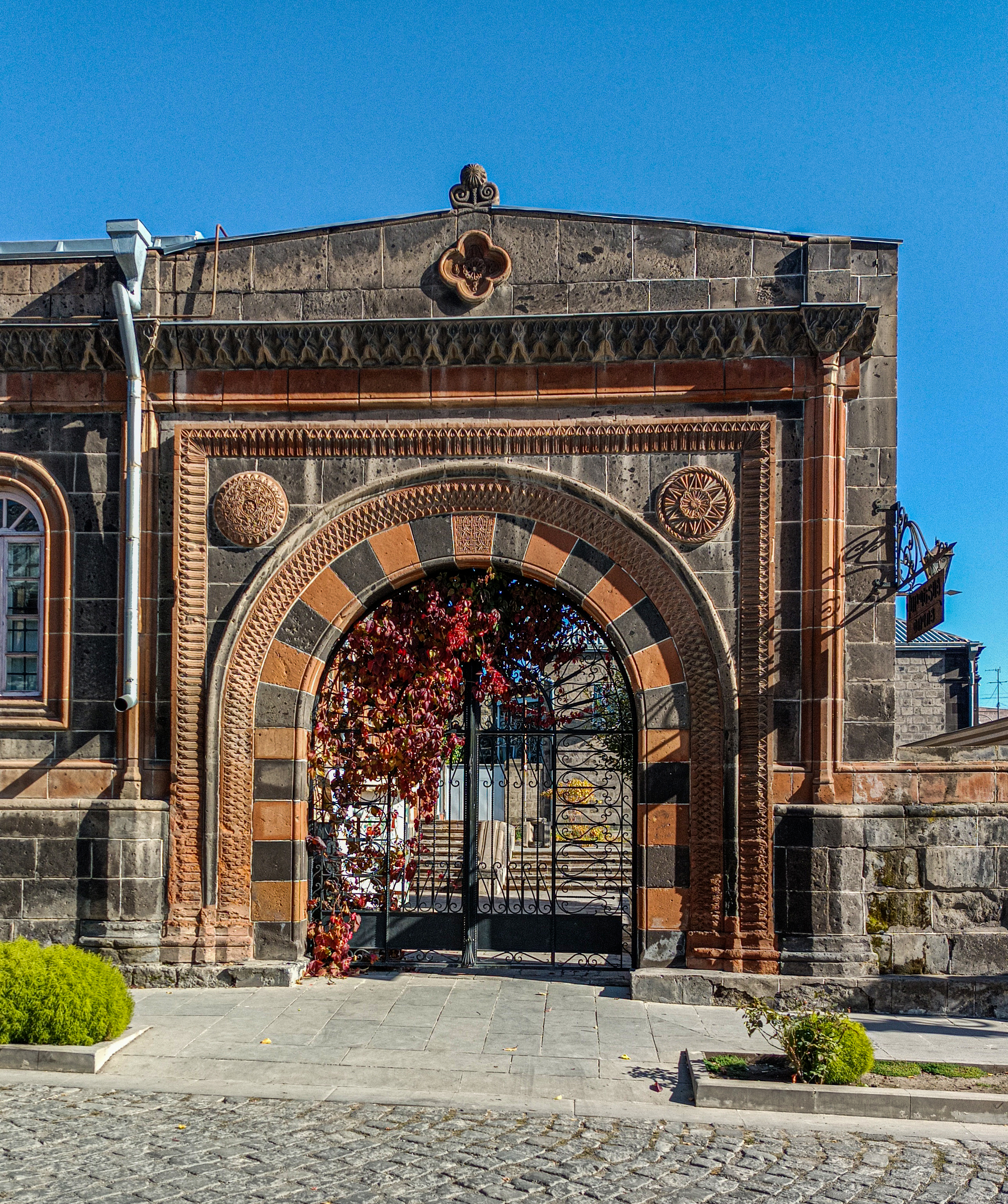

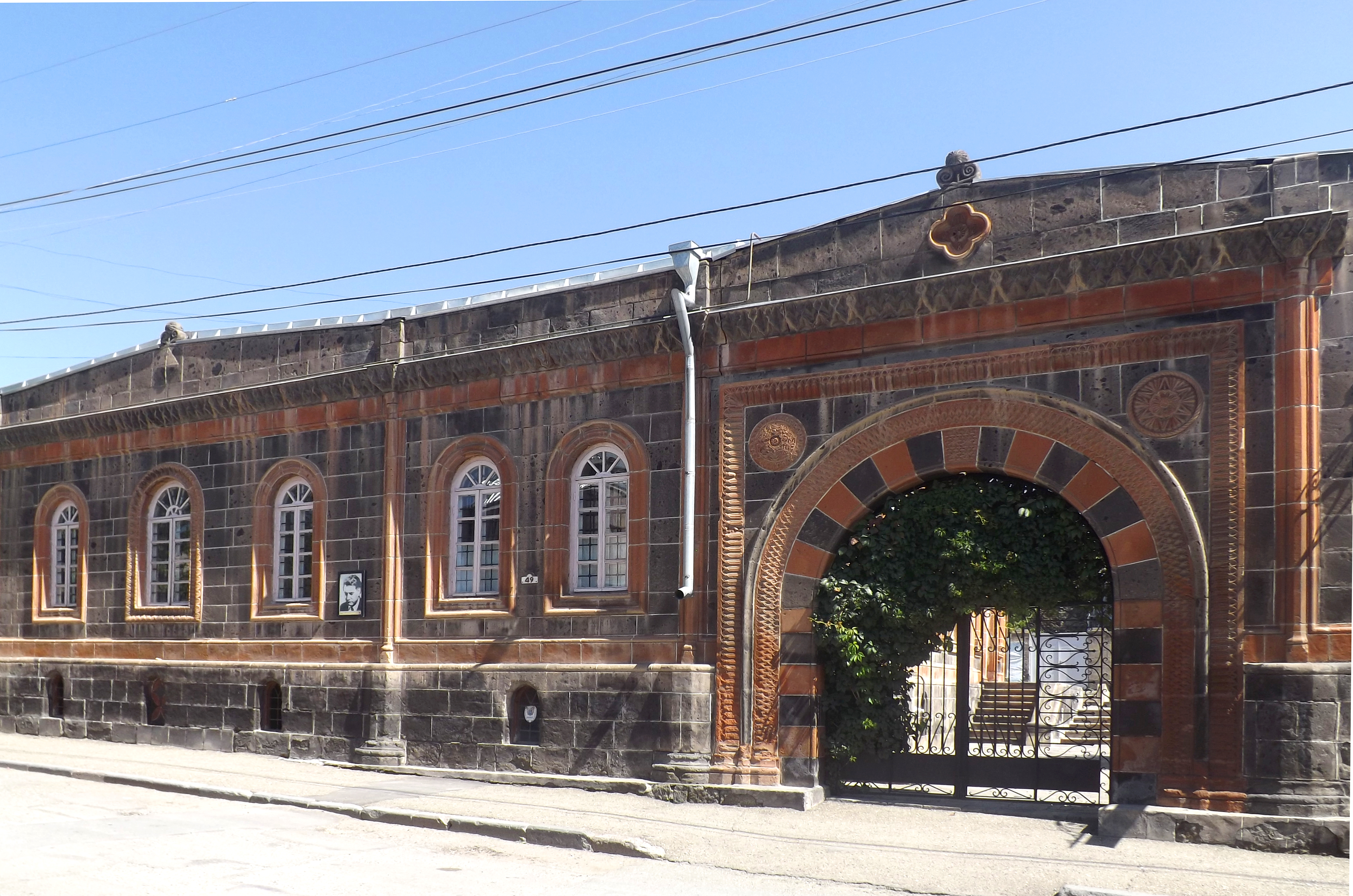

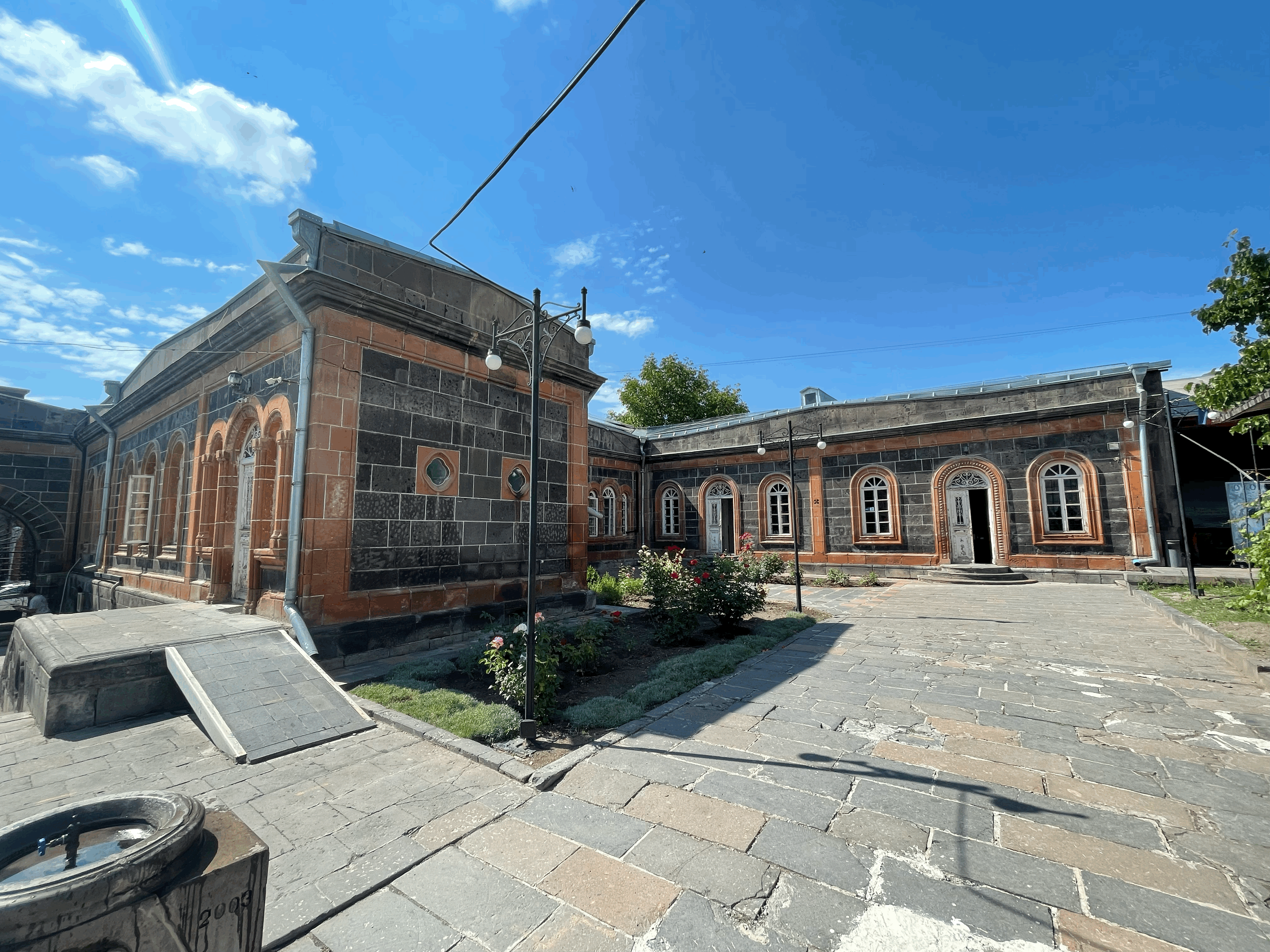

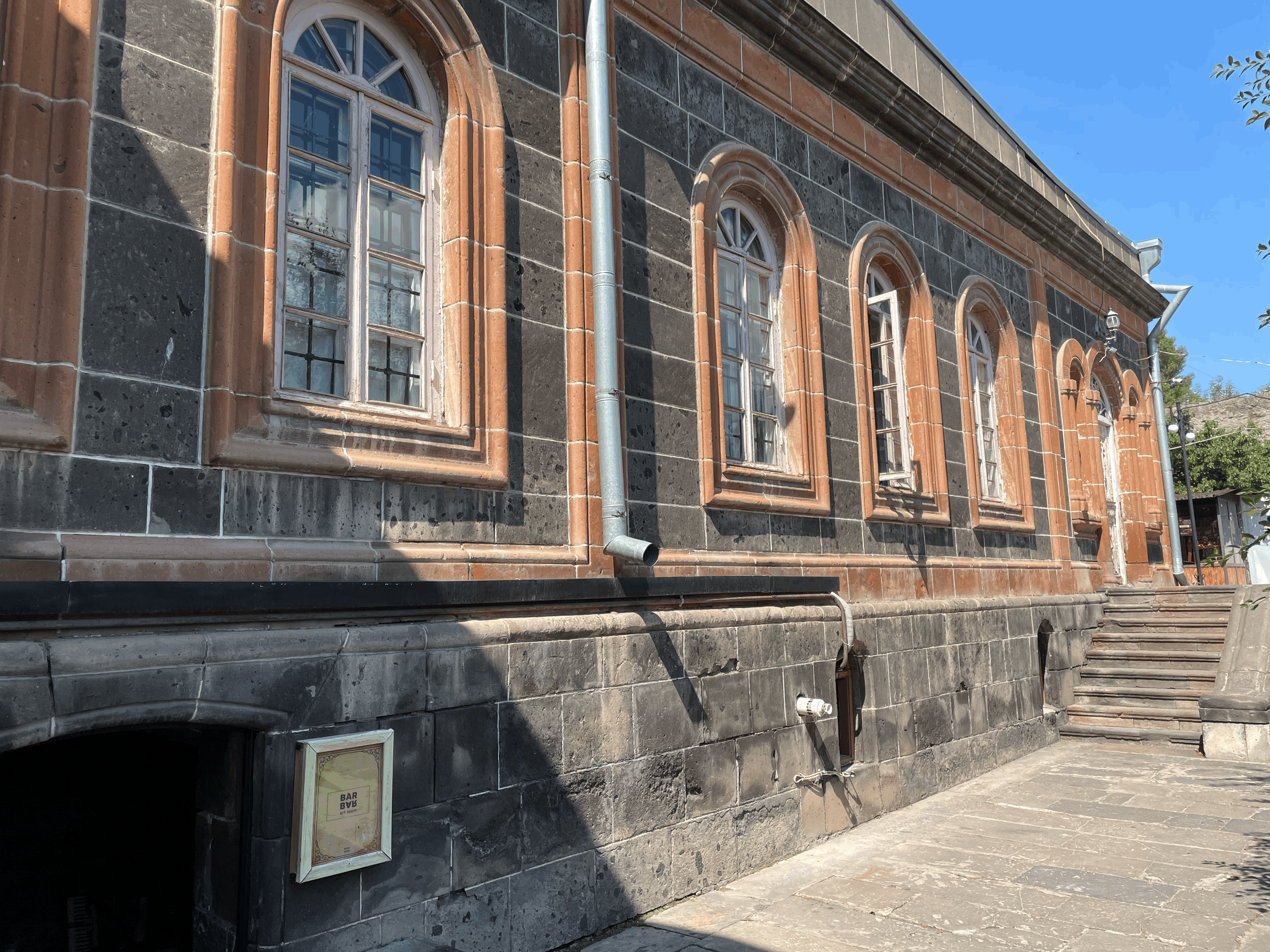

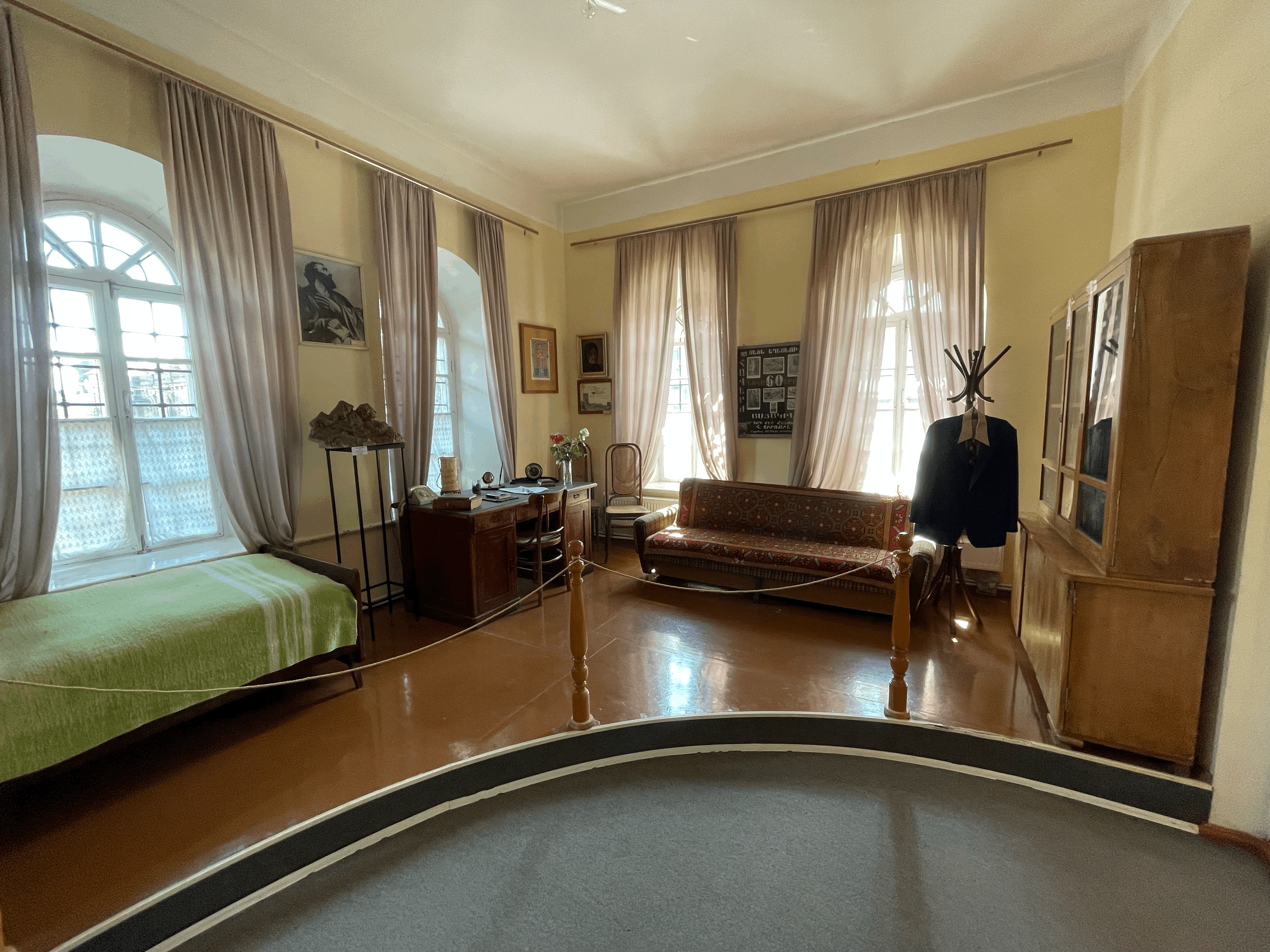

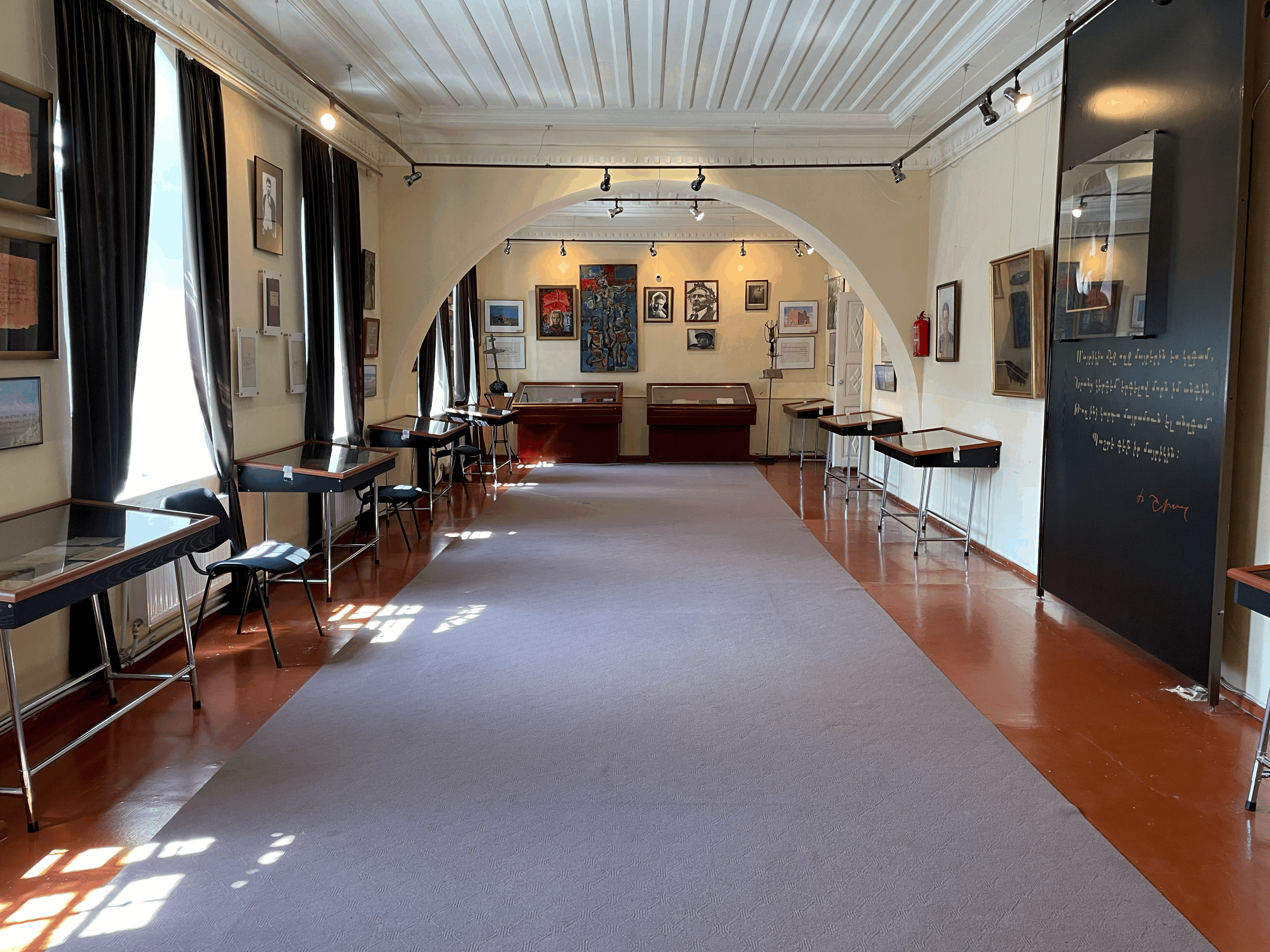

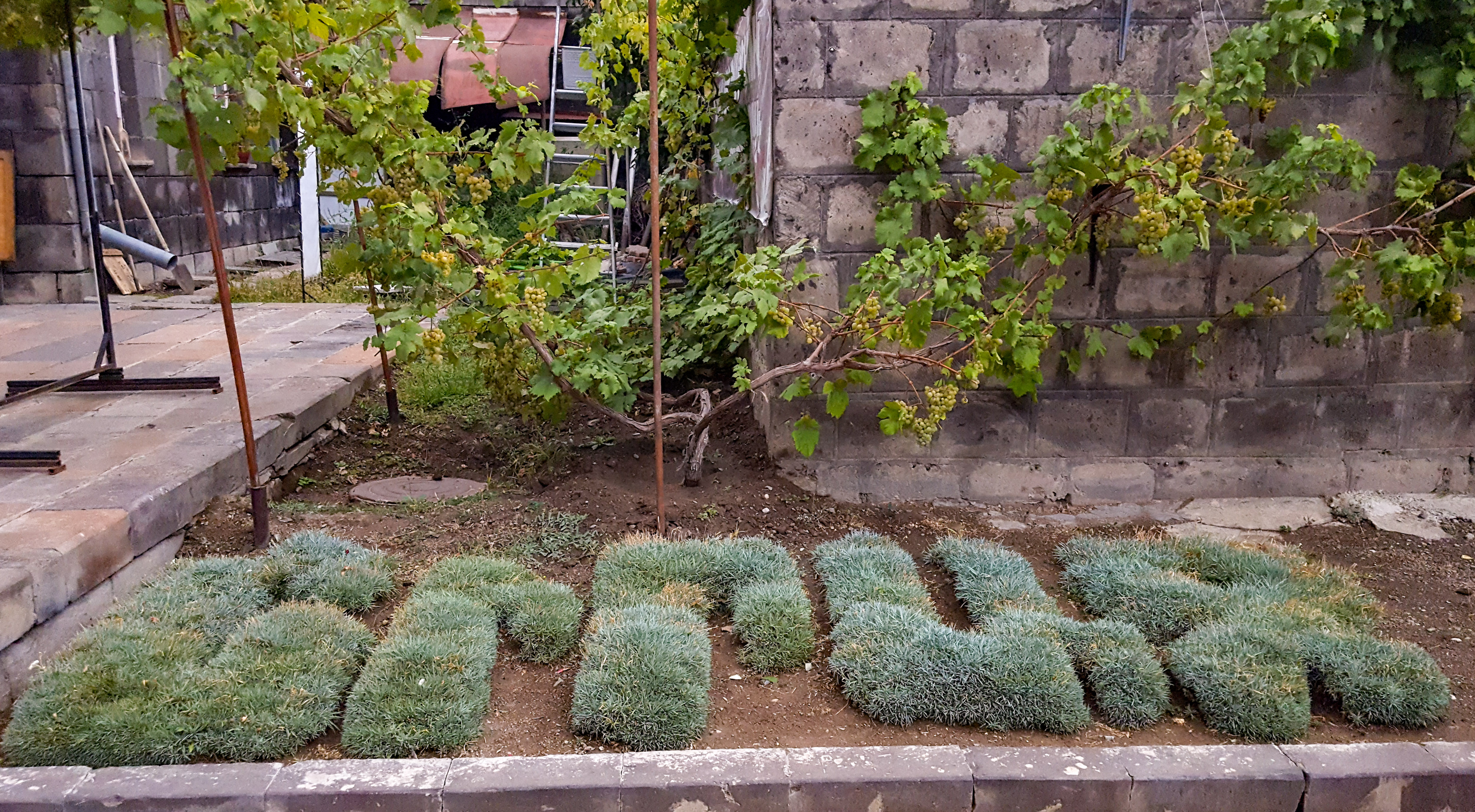

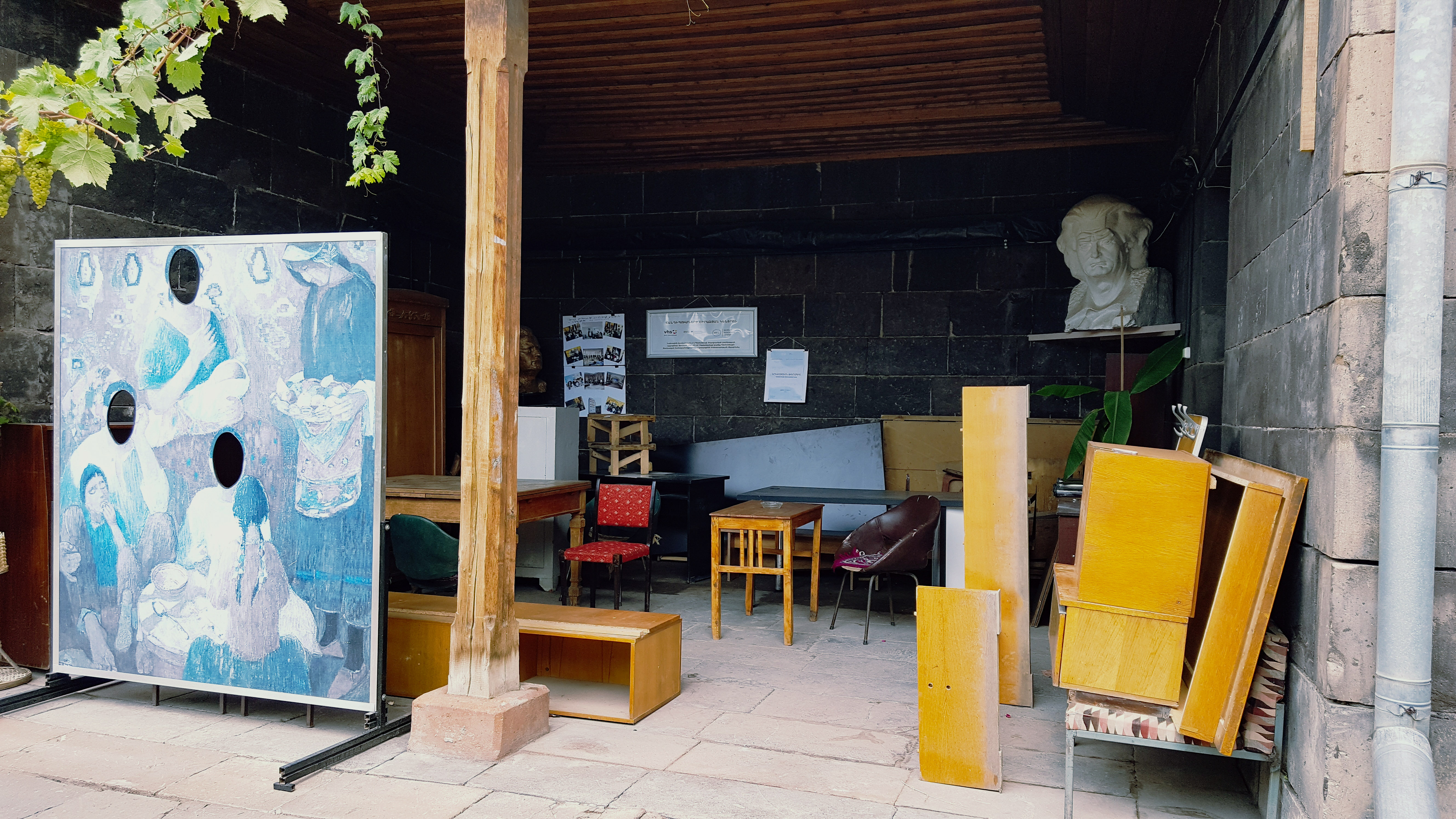

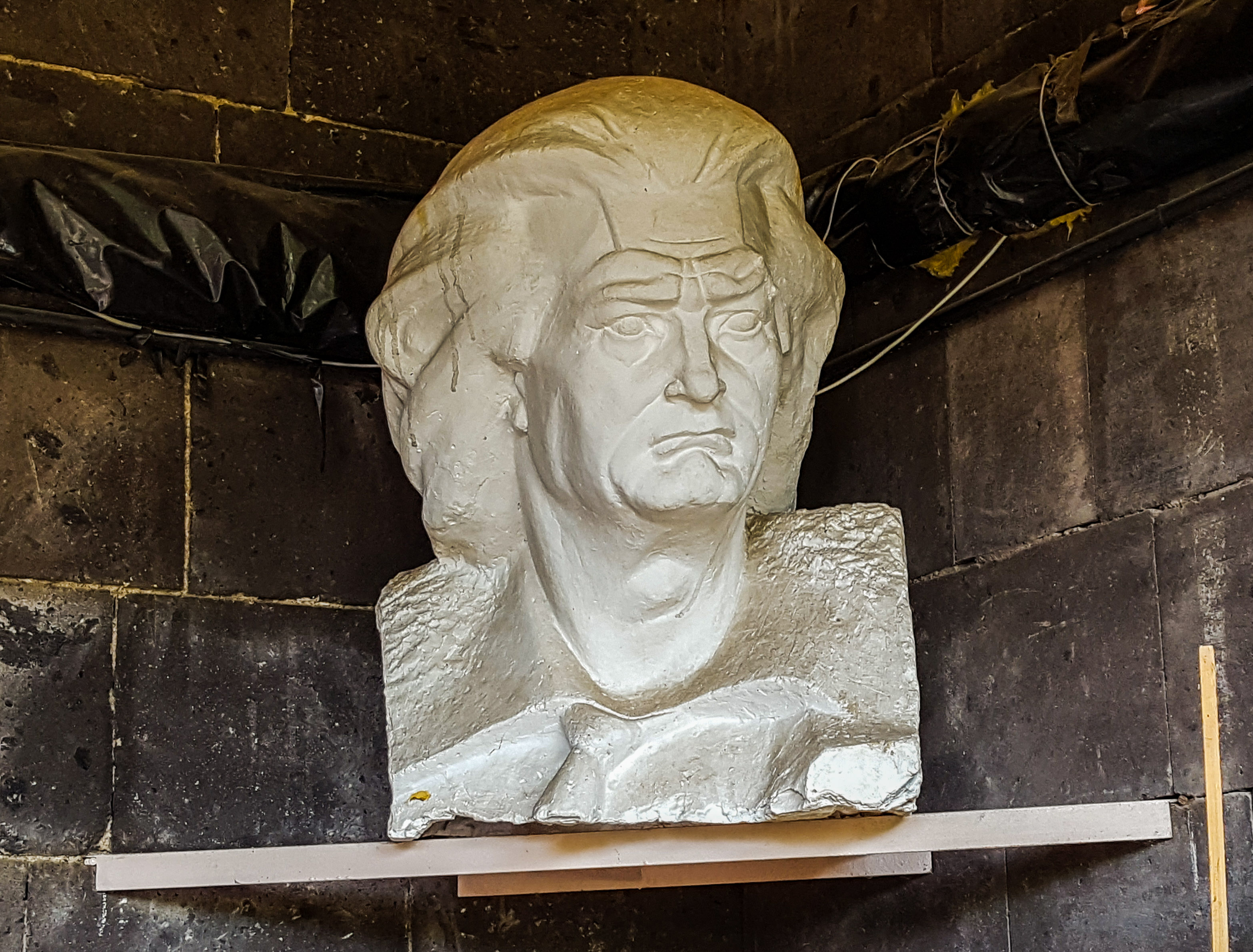

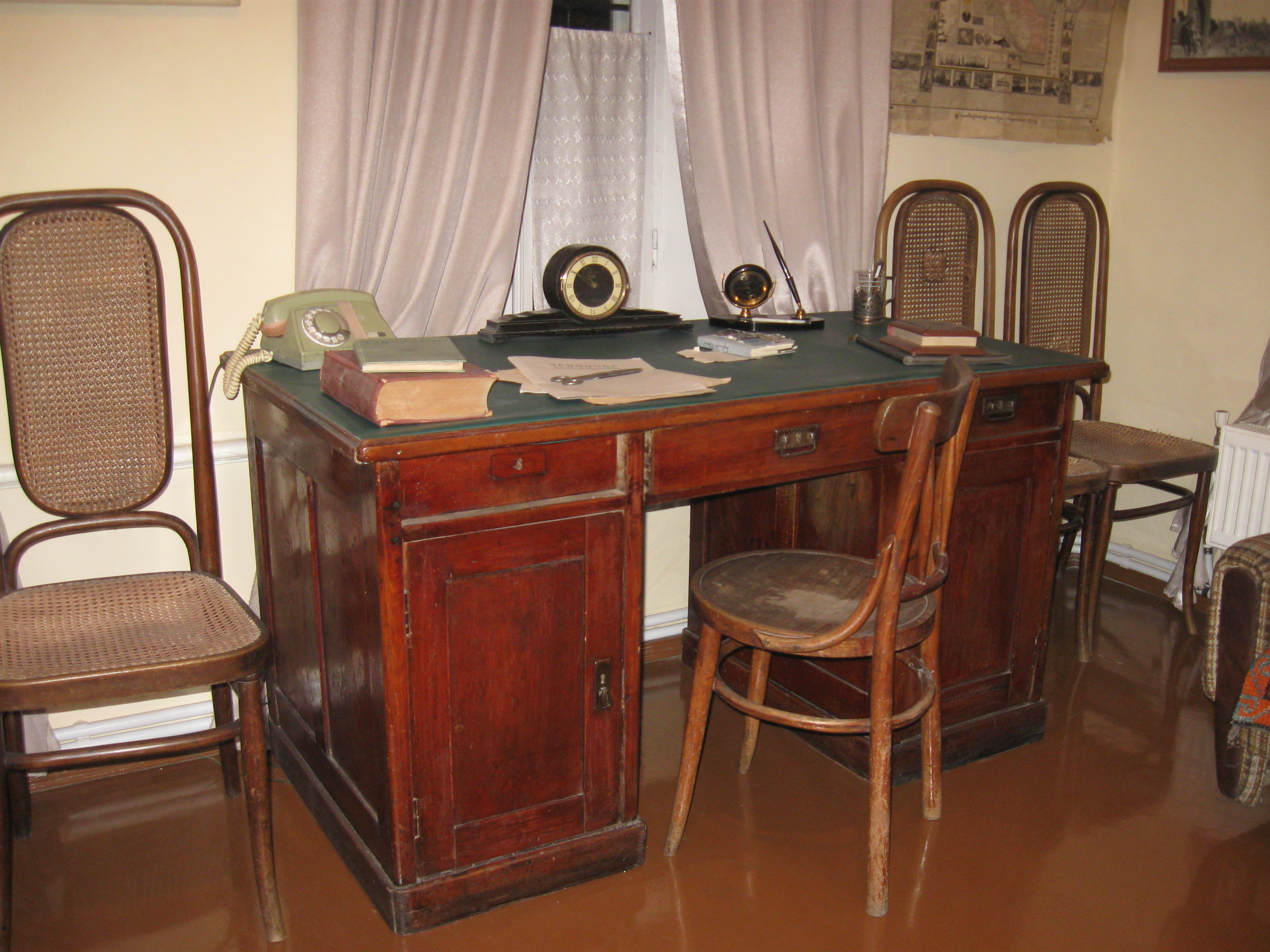

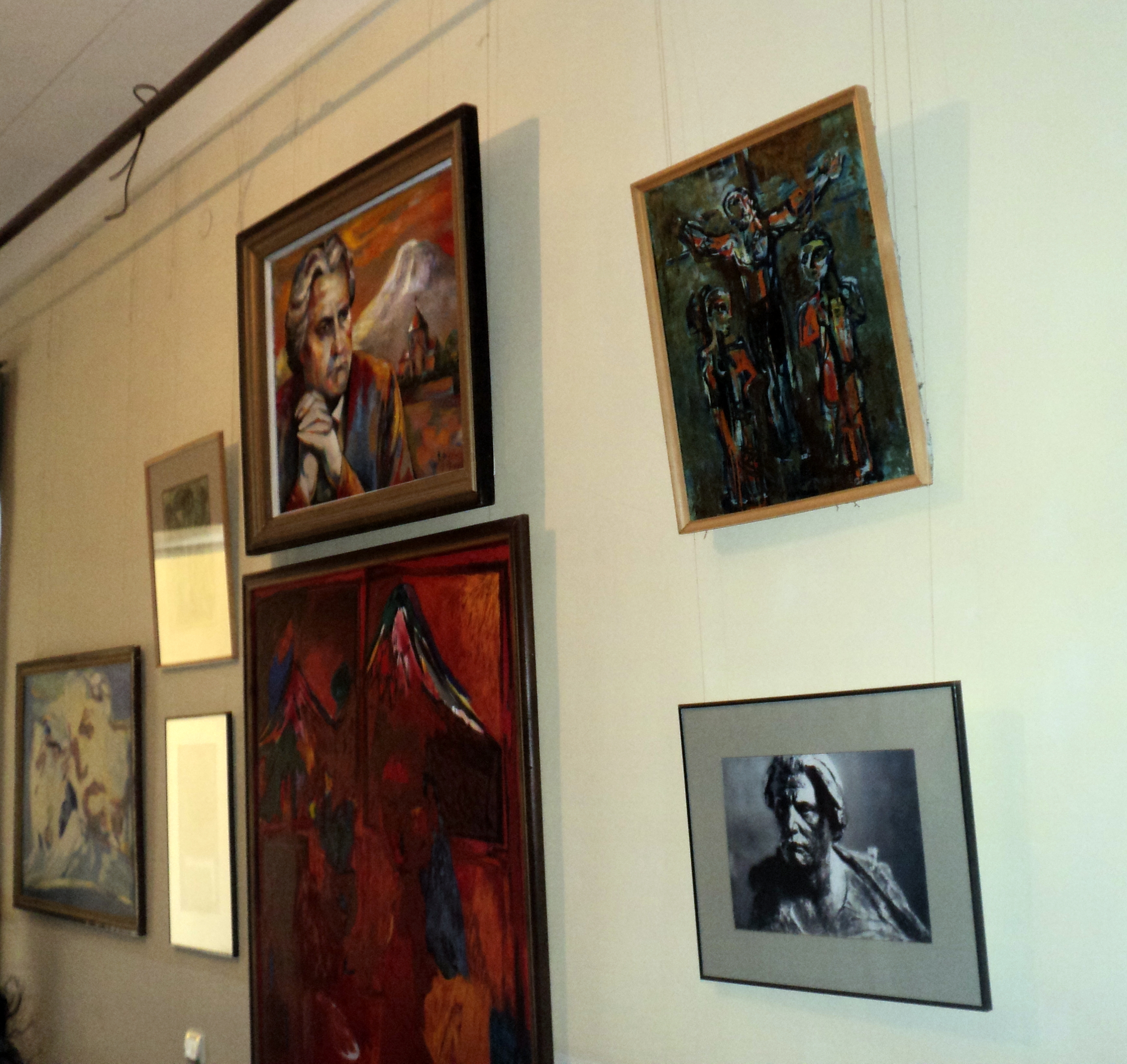

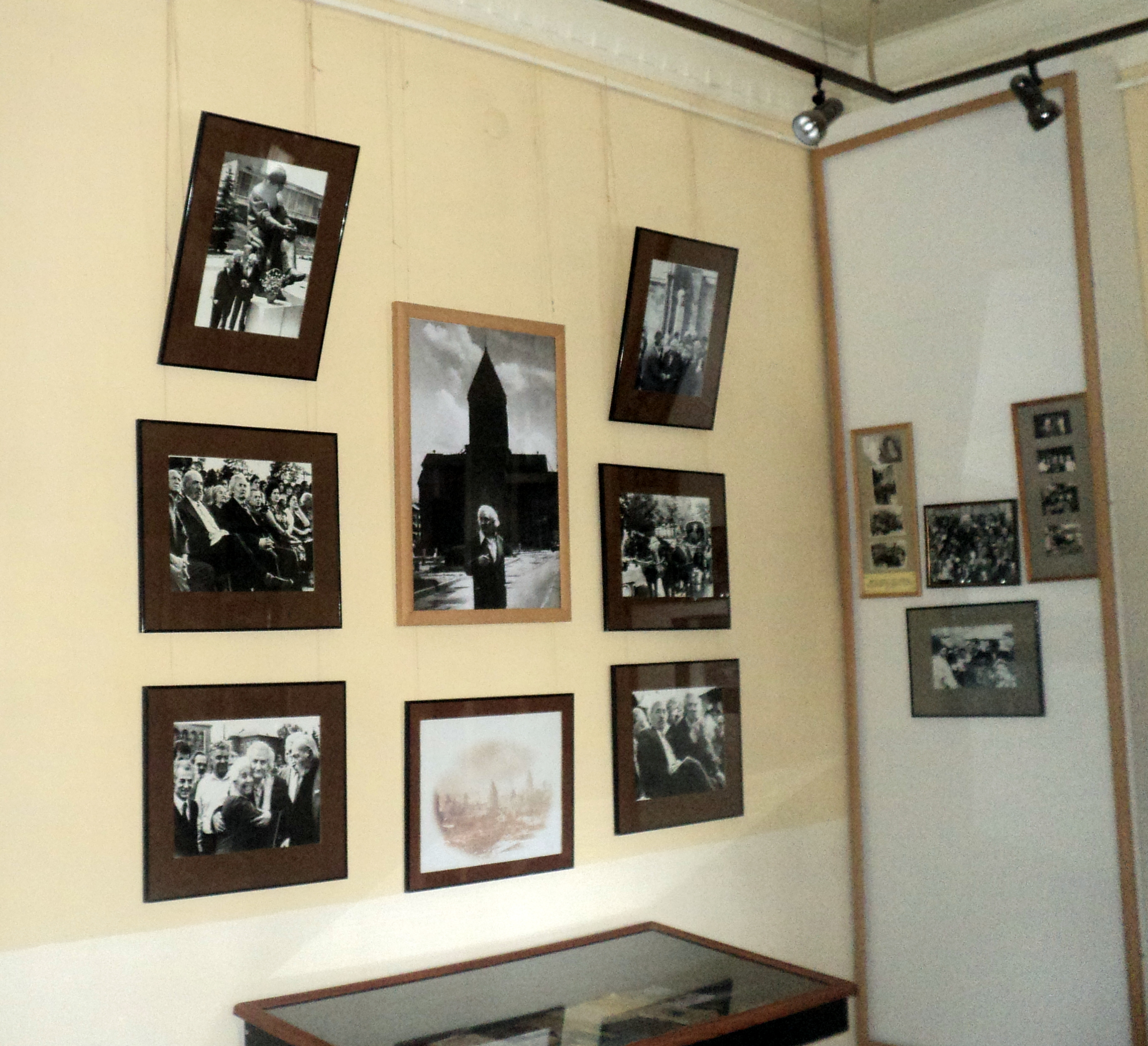

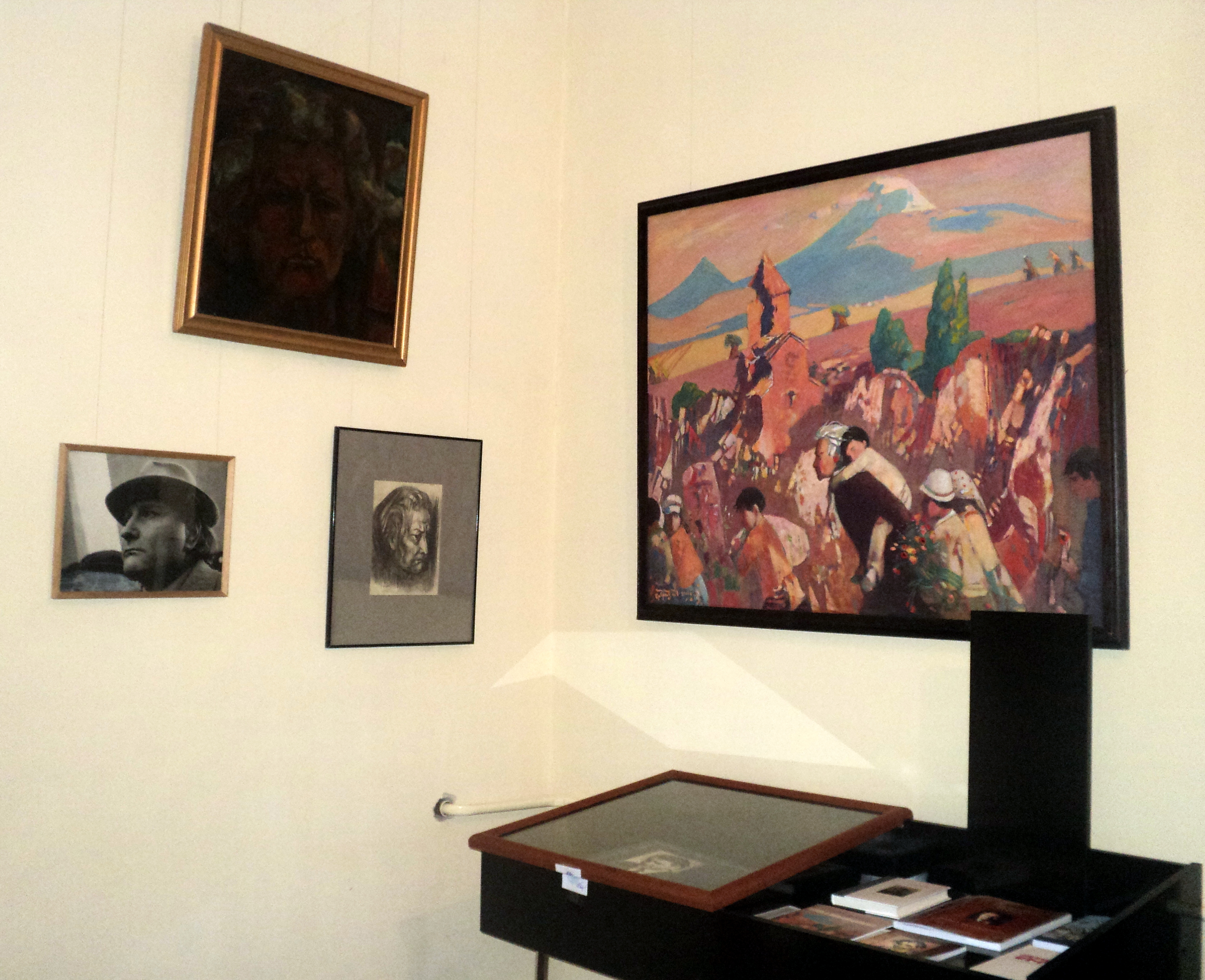
