= Shirazi-ye Olya =

Shirazi-ye Olya شيرازي عليا
- Village
- Location within Iran
- Coordinates: 34°08′29″N 47°23′35″E
- Country: Iran
- Province: Kermanshah
- County: Kermanshah
- Bakhsh: Central
- Rural District: Qarah Su

Population (2006)
  - Total: 37
- Time zone: UTC+3:30 (IRST)
  - Summer (DST): UTC+4:30 (IRDT)

Shirazi-ye Olya (Persian: شيرازي عليا, also romanized as Shīrāzī-ye ‘Olyā; also known as Shīrāzī) is a village in Qarah Su Rural District, in the Central District of Kermanshah County, Kermanshah Province, Iran. At the 2006 census, its population was 37, in 8 families.
