= Kahriz, Qarah Su =

Neighborhood in Kermanshah province, Iran

Kahriz Persian: كهريز
- Neighbourhood
- Location within Iran
- Coordinates: 34°18′22″N 47°07′20″E
- Country: Iran
- Province: Kermanshah
- County: Kermanshah
- District: Central
- City: Kermanshah

Population (2011)
  - Total: 6,457
- Time zone: UTC+3:30 (IRST)

Kahriz (Persian: كهريز) (Note: Also romanized as Kahrīz) is a neighborhood in the city of Kermanshah, Iran. It was a village in Central District of Kermanshah County, Kermanshah province. and was the capital of Qarah Su Rural District. In 2012, this village, along with several other villages, was annexed to the urban area of Kermanshah and became one of the neighborhoods of that city.

== Demographics ==
=== Population ===
At the time of the 2006 National Census, Kahriz's population was 3,542 in 752 households, when it was a village in Qarah Su Rural District. The following census in 2011 counted 6,457 people in 1,705 households. After the census, the village was absorbed by the city of Kermanshah.
