= Shirazi-ye Sofla =

Shirazi-ye Sofla شيرازي سفلي
- Village
- Location within Iran
- Coordinates: 34°06′34″N 47°25′02″E
- Country: Iran
- Province: Kermanshah
- County: Kermanshah
- Bakhsh: Central
- Rural District: Qarah Su

Population (2006)
  - Total: 75
- Time zone: UTC+3:30 (IRST)
  - Summer (DST): UTC+4:30 (IRDT)

Shirazi-ye Sofla (Persian: شيرازي سفلي, also Romanized as Shīrāzī-ye Soflá) is a village in Qarah Su Rural District, in the Central District of Kermanshah County, Kermanshah Province, Iran. At the 2006 census, its population was 75, in 12 families.
