= Sipan Shiraz =

Armenian poet, sculptor and painter

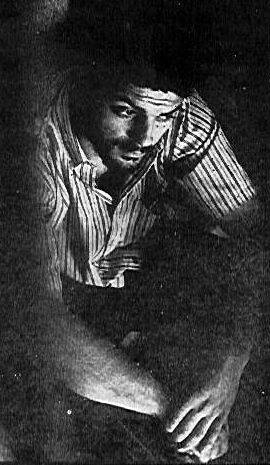
- Born: June 25, 1967; Yerevan, Armenia
- Died: April 15, 1997 (aged 29); Yerevan, Armenia
- Occupation: Poet
- Writing career
- Genre: Lyric poetry

Sipan Shiraz (Armenian: Սիփան Շիրազ; June 25, 1967 – April 15, 1997) was an Armenian poet, sculptor and painter.

== Biography ==
Born Sipan Hovhannesi Karapetyan, he was the son of Armenian poet Hovhannes Shiraz and his second wife, Shushanik. He studied sculpting at Panos Terlemezyan State Art College and Yerevan State Art Institute. Shiraz was an author of poetry books and memoirs about his father. He was a member of the Writers Union of Armenia and also worked at Yerevan radio. According to poet Artashes Ghazaryan, "Sipan lived as a meteor".

During his short life he published 7 books of poems. He is buried at Yerevan Central Cemetery’s Pantheon.

== Bibliography ==
- Mahamerdz tari, Yerevan, 1992, 149 p., ISBN 5-550-00815-7
- Hayrik, Yerevan, 1993, 103 p.
- Selected poems, 2008, 272 p.
