= Ara Shiraz =

Armenian sculptor (1941–2014)

- Արա Շիրազ
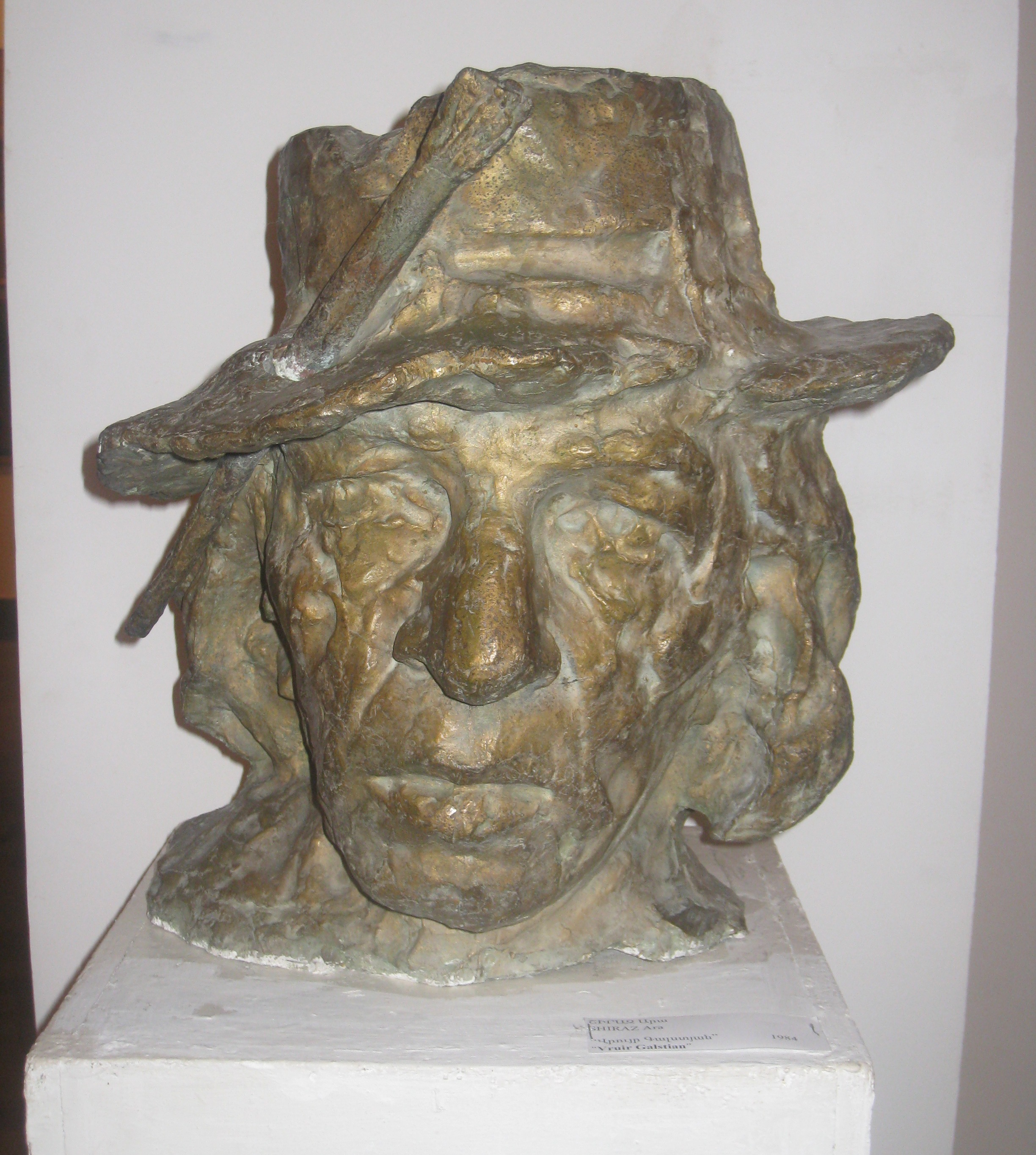
- Head bust of Ara Shiraz
- Born: Aramazd Karapetyan; June 8, 1941; Yerevan, Armenian SSR, Soviet Union
- Died: March 18, 2014 (aged 72); Yerevan, Armenia
- Known for: Sculpture
- Notable work: State of Andranik (2002)
- Spouse: Marie Rose Abousefian (m. 1967; div. 1971)
- Children: Lusine (LuLu) Shiraz
- Parents: Hovhannes Shiraz (father); Silva Kaputikyan (mother)

Ara Shiraz (Armenian: Արա Շիրազ, June 8, 1941 – March 18, 2014) was an Armenian sculptor. His mother and father were the poets Silva Kaputikyan and Hovhannes Shiraz.

== Biography ==
Ara Shiraz was born Aramazd Karapetyan (Armenian: Արամազդ Կարապետյան) in Yerevan in 1941. He graduated from the Institute of Fine Arts and Theatre of Yerevan in 1966. He participated in numerous exhibitions of young artists in Armenia and the Soviet Union. He was a member of the Painters Union of Armenia from 1968 until his death. His works have been exhibited in major cities of the U.S.S.R. (Moscow, Leningrad, Tbilisi) as part of solo and group shows. He took part in the Festival of Armenian Art "From Urartu to the Present" (Paris, 1970).

Shiraz was characterized by his monumental sculptural works. He was awarded the State Award of Armenia for his ornamental sculptures decorating the facade of the Dvin Hotel in Yerevan. In 1977 he was granted the title of Emeritus Artist of Armenia. In 1987 he was elected the president of the Artists' Union of Armenia, and a member of the Secretariat of the Artists' Union of the U.S.S.R.

In 2017, his works were displayed at the National Gallery of Armenia in an exhibition titled "Ara Shiraz: Retrospective".

== Works ==
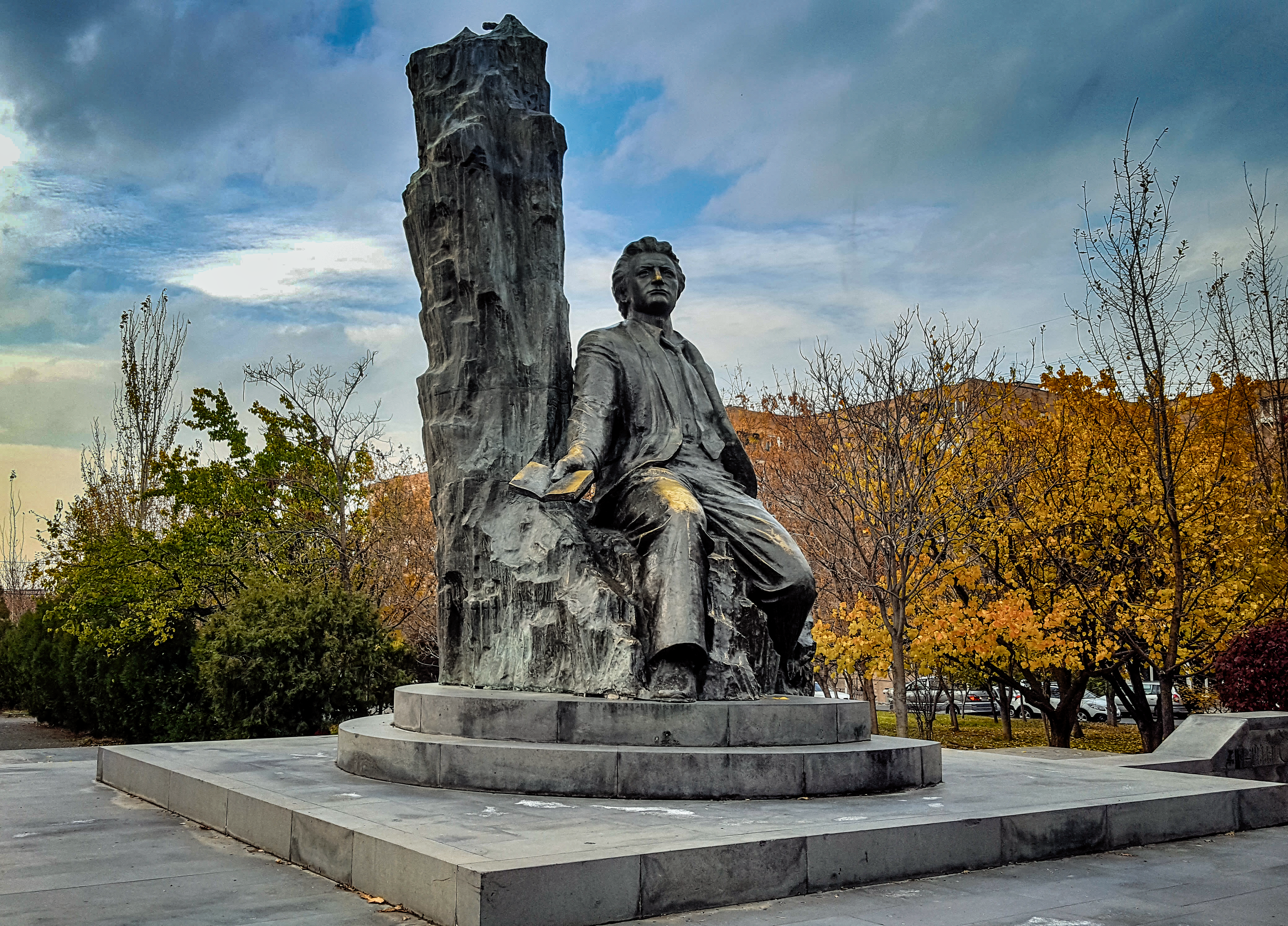
Statue of Hovhannes Shiraz in the Malatia-Sebastia district of Yerevan.

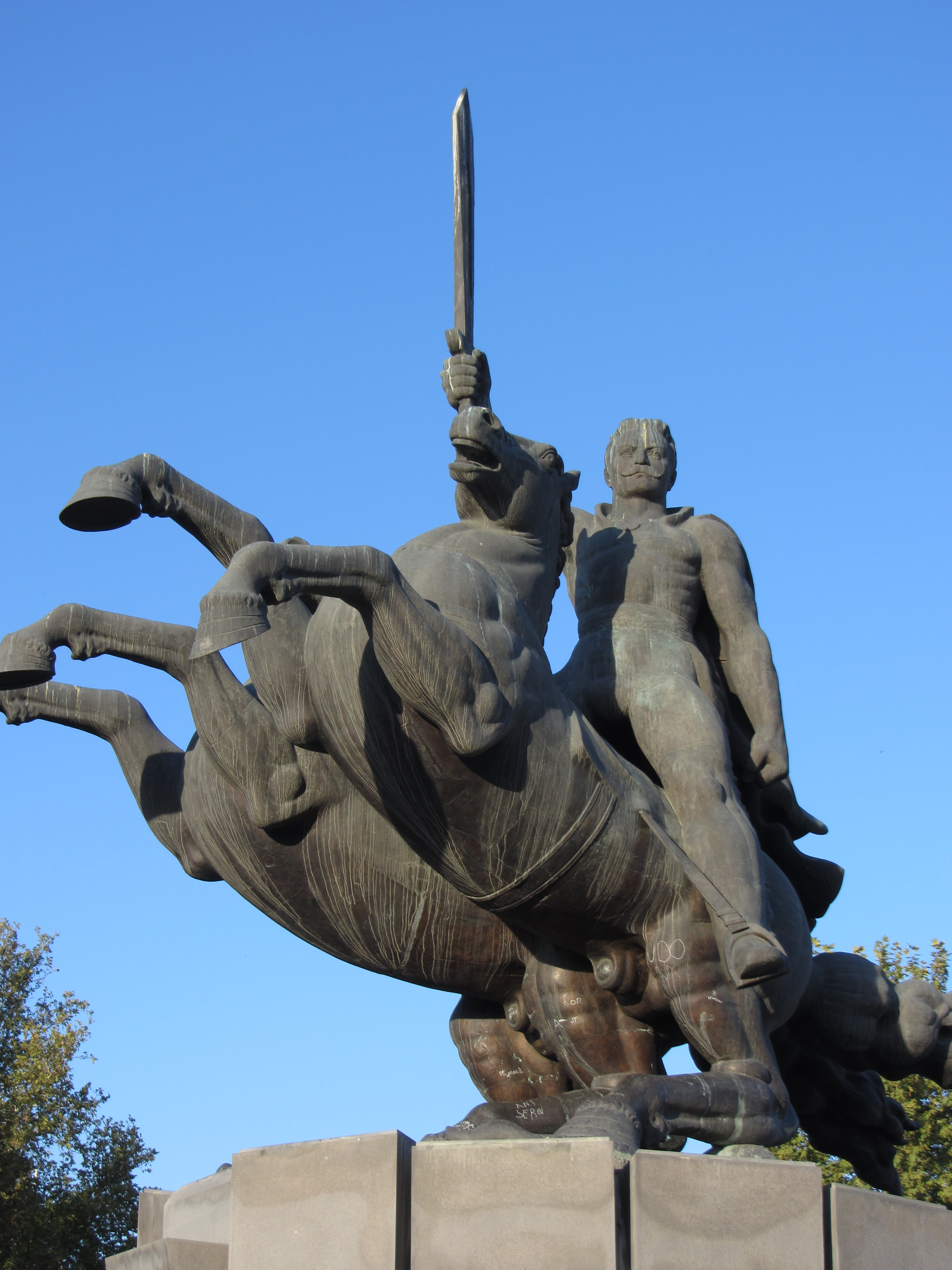
Statue of Andranik (2002) near Saint Gregory Cathedral.

Shiraz' most renowned works include the busts of Pablo Picasso, Yervand Kochar, Hovhannes Shiraz and Vruir Galstian. Many of his sculptural compositions are on permanent exhibit in the Modern Art Museum of Armenia, the State Gallery of Armenia, the Tretyakov Gallery and the Eastern Nations Museum of Art in Moscow.

Shiraz's paintings and sculptures are found in many private collections throughout the world: Moscow, St. Petersburg, Tbilisi, Yerevan, Beirut, Paris, London, New York City, Los Angeles, Chicago, Detroit and Montreal.

His works include:

- Yeghishe Charents, Charentsavan (1977)
- Paruyr Sevak, Yerevan (1978)
- Aleksandr Miasnikian, Yerevan (1980)
- William Saroyan, Komitas Pantheon, Yerevan (1984)
- Tigran Petrosian, Chess House, Yerevan (1989)
- Hovhannes Shiraz, Komitas Pantheon (1989)
- Sergei Parajanov, Komitas Pantheon (1999)
- Andranik, Saint Gregory the Illumminator Cathedral (2002)
- Hovhannes Shiraz, Malatia-Sebastia District, Yerevan (2005)
- Vazgen I, Vaskenian Theological Academy, Sevan (2008)

== Awards ==
- Honored Artist of the Armenian SSR (1977)
- State Prize of the Armenian SSR (1979)
- RA President Award (2008)
- People's Artist of Armenia (2009)
