= Hovhannes Shiraz =

Armenian poet (1915–1984)

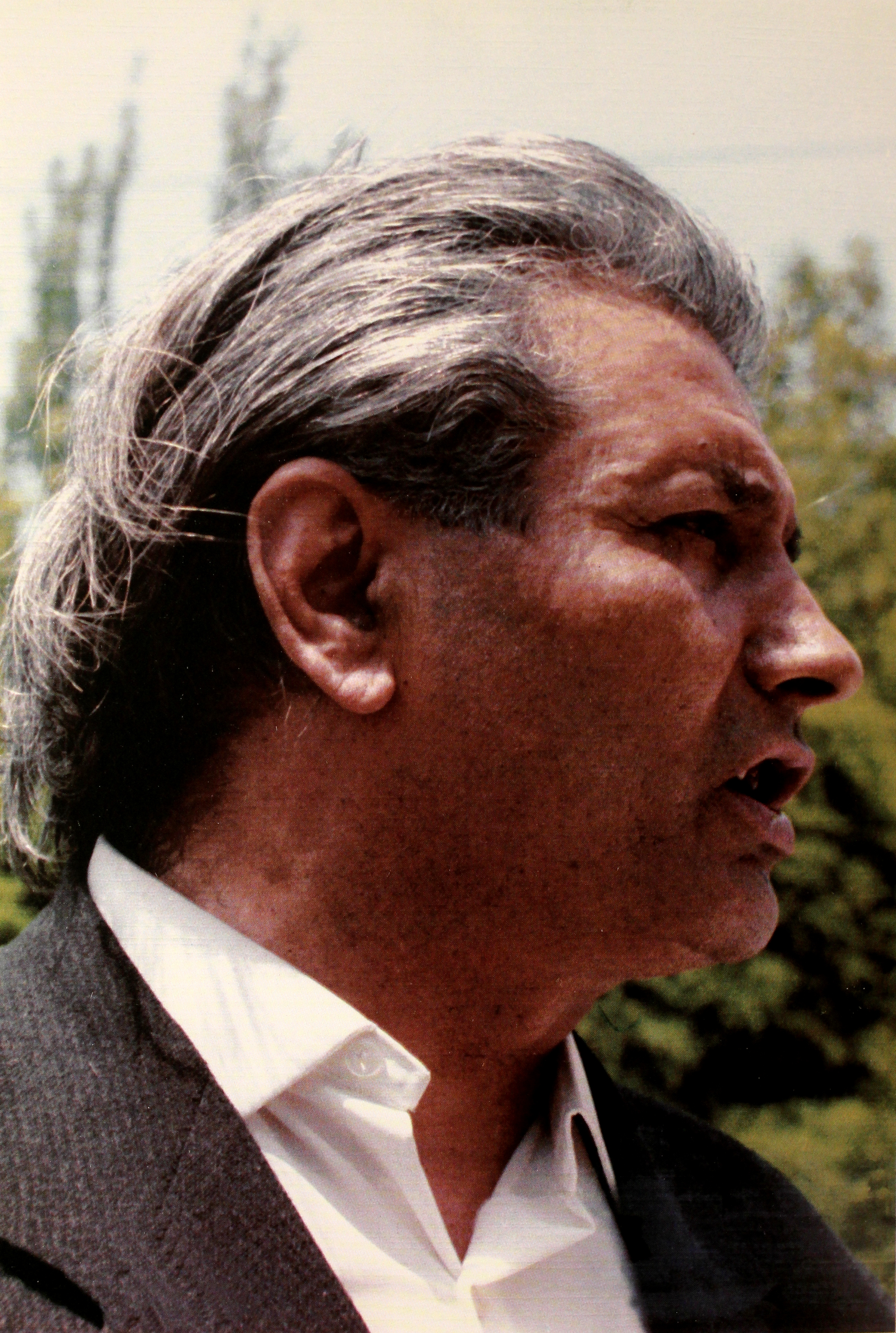
- Born: Onik Tadevosi Karapetyan; 27 April 1915; Alexandropol, Russian Empire
- Died: 14 March 1984 (aged 69); Yerevan, Armenian SSR, Soviet Union
- Resting place: Komitas Pantheon
- Occupation: Poet
- Spouses: Silva Kaputikyan (divorced); Shushanik Aristakesyan
- Children: 8, including Ara and Sipan
- Writing career
- Genre: Lyric poetry
- Notable awards: State Prize of the Armenian SSR (1975)

Hovhannes Shiraz (Armenian: Հովհաննես Շիրազ; April 27, 1915 – March 14, 1984) was an Armenian poet.

== Biography ==
Shiraz was born Onik Tadevosi Karapetyan in the city of Alexandropol, then part of the Russian Empire (now Gyumri, Armenia). His mother, Astghik, was widowed by the Armenian genocide shortly before his birth. Shiraz grew up in considerable poverty. His first work, called Beginning of Spring, was published in 1935. Novelist Atrpet gave the talented poet the epithet "Shiraz", because "this youth's poems have the fragrance of roses, fresh and covered with dew, like the roses of Shiraz" (Shiraz being one of Iran's major cities, famous for its roses and poets). Another version of his pen name is "Shirak azn"—a child of Shirak, the region he was from.

In 1937 Hovhannes Shiraz entered the Armenian Literature Department at Yerevan State University, where he studied until 1941. He also studied at the Moscow Maxim Gorky Literature Institute. In 1958, he published the first volume of his anthology Knar Hayastani (Lyre of Armenia). The second and third volumes were published in 1965 and 1974. These collections include the best examples of Shiraz's poetry.

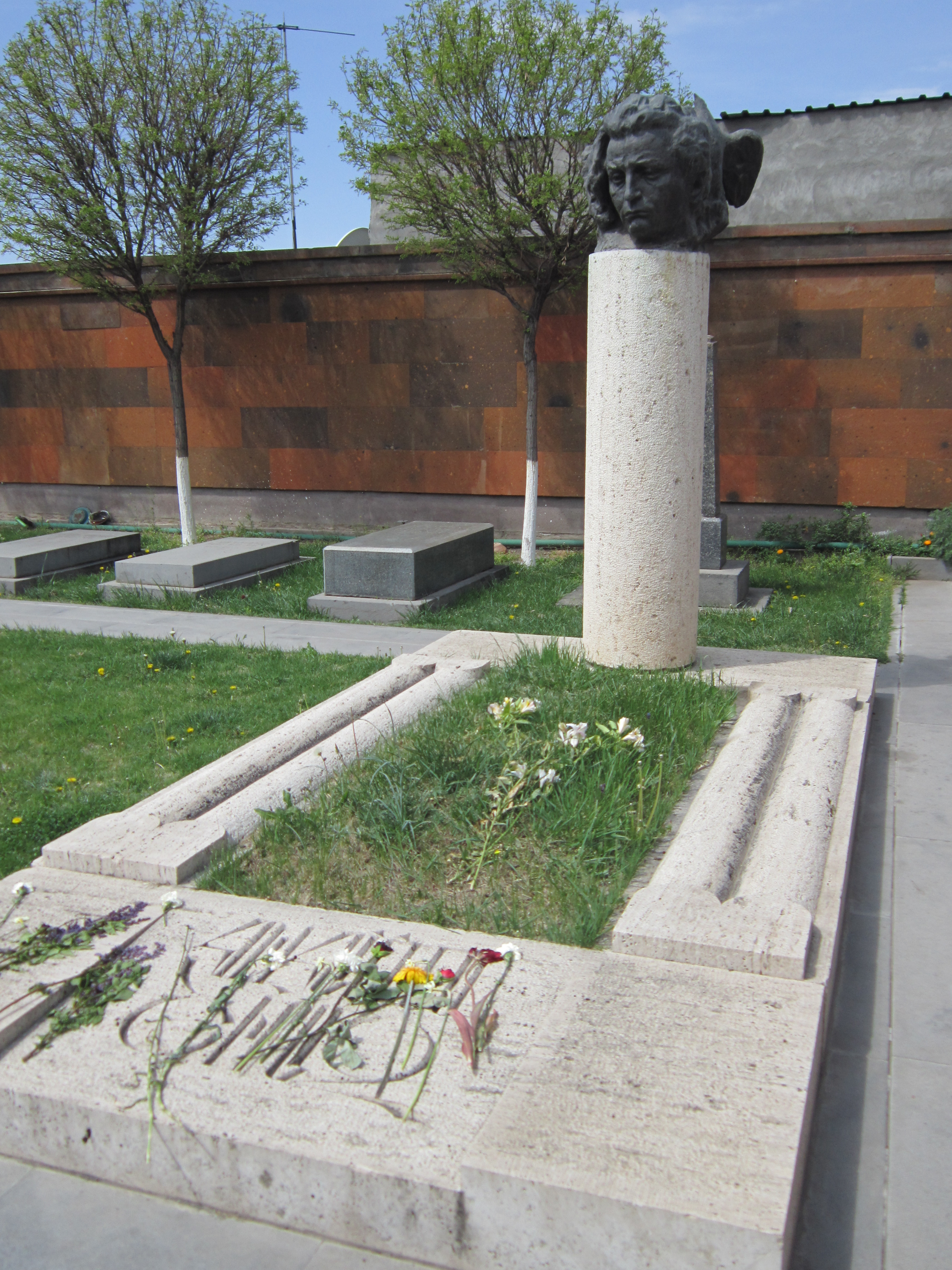
Hovhannes Shiraz's tombstone in Komitas Pantheon

Shiraz mostly wrote and published poetry. He is the author of many popular patriotic and love poems including "Ani", "My Mother", "May my love remain a secret", "Siamanto and Khjezare", "Expromptu", "Like the Pagan Love", "My Holy Homeland", "The Fate of Armenians", "To Andranik", etc. He wrote "The Armenian Dante-esque" about the Armenian genocide, a subject that was banned in Soviet Union. The first version of this masterpiece was written in 1941. Only short passages from this work were published in Soviet Armenia during his lifetime, and some chapters were published in Beirut and Tehran. The entire poem (over 8000 lines) was published in 1990 in Yerevan.

He first married the famous Armenian poet Silva Kaputikyan. His son with Kaputikyan, Ara Shiraz, was a sculptor. Shiraz had seven children with his second wife, Shushanik Shiraz (Aristakesyan), one of whom was Sipan Shiraz, a poet.

He was buried at Komitas Pantheon in Yerevan, along with other distinguished Armenians.

Yerevan school #169, and a street in Julfa, Isfahan, are named after him. The Hovhannes Shiraz House-Museum is located in a nineteenth-century building in Gyumri.

In 2014, the Central Bank of Armenia issued a 10000 dram silver commemorative coin dedicated to the centenary of Hovhannes Shiraz’s birthday.

== Personality ==
Shiraz was known for his good sense of humour. In 1963 John Steinbeck visited the poet's apartment in Yerevan, and later wrote in a letter: "...men are closest together when they laugh together. And I remember that in Yerevan we laughed together a great deal."

Yevgeny Yevtushenko and Alexander Gitovich dedicated poems to Shiraz.

Shiraz was an anti-establishment poet, popular among the people of Soviet Armenia, who fought against its corrupt Soviet leadership all his life. In 1974, when the well-known literary critic Suren Aghababyan informed Shiraz about his award of the Order of Lenin, Shiraz responded: "And what they [the Soviet government] want in exchange? To buy my silence?"

== Poetry ==
Shiraz is an author of about forty poetry books and translations. His rich vocabulary and sensitive style, enhanced by folk and colloquial elements, made his poetry one of the highest achievements of Armenian literature. Critics consider many of his works to be masterpieces. According to Paruyr Sevak, "Modern Armenian poetry has risen on the ridge of Shiraz". "Shiraz is a great talent, we should be proud and consider as a great honor that we personally know him", wrote William Saroyan. Shiraz built his poems with Armenian "tuff of emotions", added Yevgeny Yevtushenko.

In my dreams my door was knocked at,
"Who is it?" I asked from inside.
Some elderly lady from the outside
Answered and said, "I'd sacrifice myself for you."

"I've come to ask for a piece of bread as charity
I'm a poor orphan woman with no one to support me."
At this point I opened my door immediately,
Only to find a miracle; it was my deceased mother indeed!

I was shocked but fell into her arms;
And my mother said, "It's me, it's me,
I've come to try you and to check on you.
I hope life hasn't changed your spirit and also you?!"

I came in the form of a beggar
So that the whole world can be a witness
To see if your conscience, my dear son,
If your conscience also died along with me?!"

(Translated from Armenian by Daniel Janoyan)

Poems of Shiraz are known throughout the former USSR (his works were translated by Arseny Tarkovsky and Nikolay Aseev) and abroad. As Andrey Dementyev writes, Hovhannes Shiraz, like Sergey Yesenin, uses many metaphors, so it's very hard to translate his poems.

During a meeting with Soviet writers, to demonstrate what kind of poetry he liked best, Hindi writer Bhisham Sahni, showed a journal containing poems by Hovhannes Shiraz.

== House-Museum ==
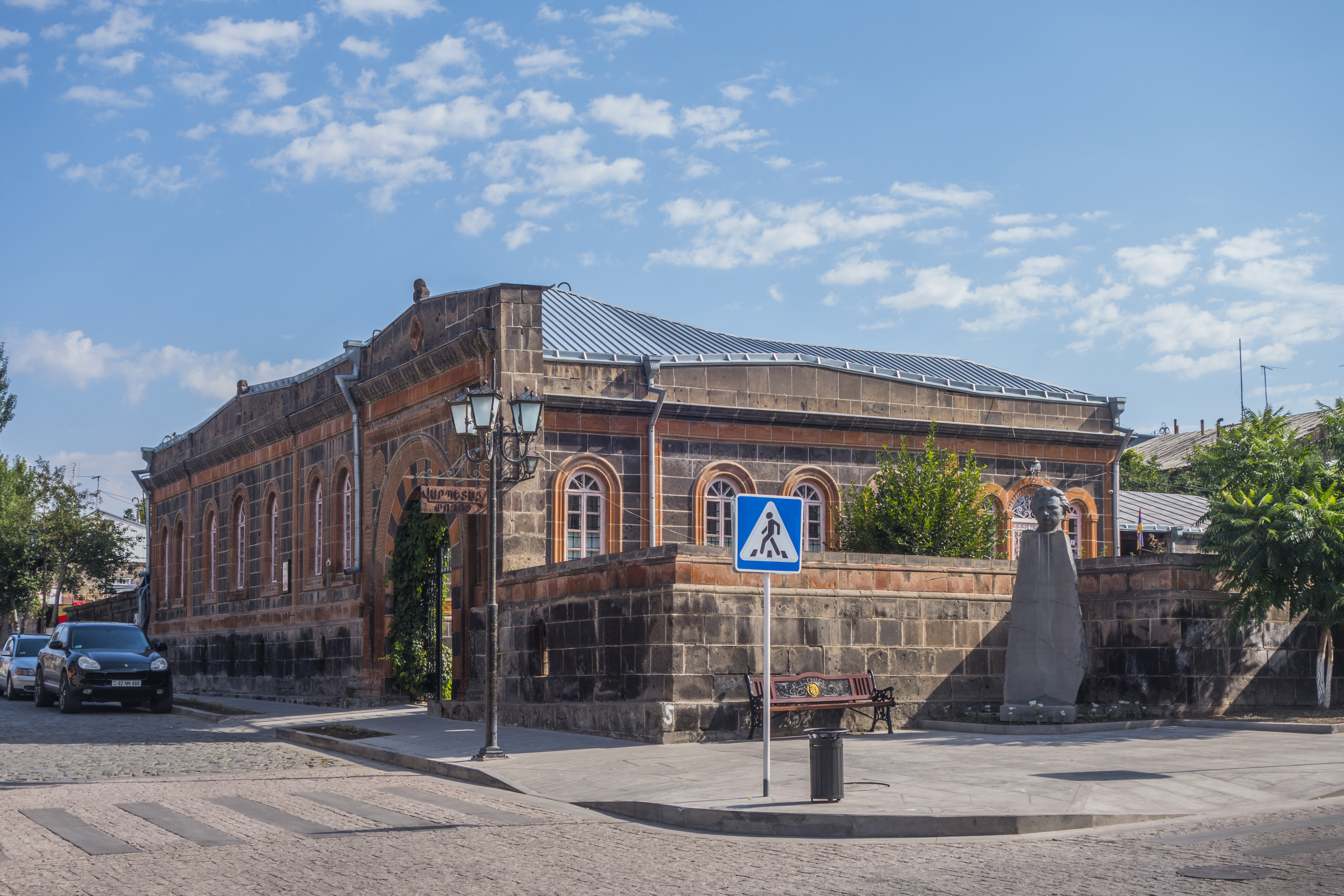
Hovhannes Shiraz House-Museum in Gyumri

The Hovhannes Shiraz House-Museum is located on Varpetats Street, Gyumri. In July 1983, Soviet Armenian officials presented the house to Shiraz. The house was built in 1886 and belonged to a millionaire. During the Soviet era, it was used as a storehouse. Due to the 1988 Armenian earthquake, the museum's refurbishment was interrupted, and 8 homeless families found shelter in the house. In 2003 it became a house-museum by the resolution of the Armenian government.

== Selected works ==
- (1935) Garnanamut (Գարնանամուտ, Beginning of spring. Poems)
- (1940) Yerg Hayastani (Երգ Հայաստանի, Song of Armenia. Poems)
- (1942) Banasteghtsi dzaynë (Բանաստեղծի ձայնը, The poet's voice. Poem)
- (1942) Yergeri girk’ (Երգերի գիրք, Book of songs. Poems)
- (1944) Bibliakan (Բիբլիական, Biblical. Poem)
- (1958–1974) K’nar Hayastani (Քնար Հայաստանի, Lyre of Armenia. Three volumes. Poems)
- (1968) Hushardzan mayrikis (Հուշարձան մայրիկիս, A monument to my mother. Poems)
- (1982) Khaghaghut’yun amenets’un (Խաղաղություն ամենեցուն, Peace to everybody. Poem)

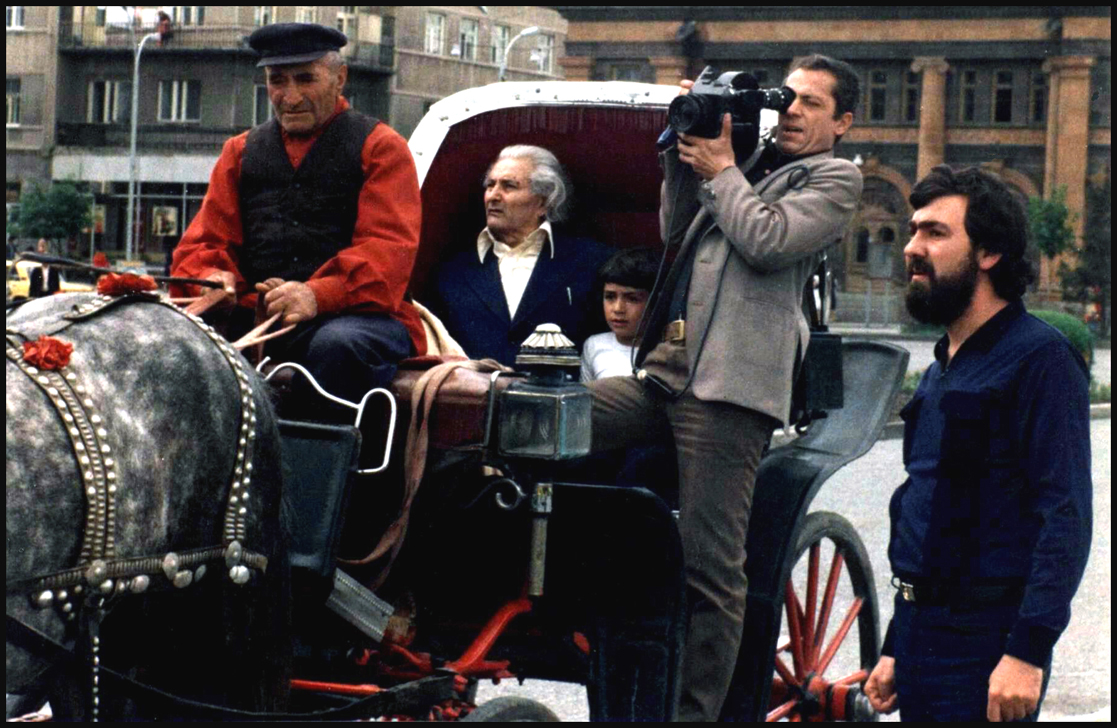
Levon Mkrtchyan directing "Hovhannes Shiraz: A Documentary", 1983

== Filmography ==
- "On the Path to Eternity", Armenfilm, 1983, 35mm, director Levon Mkrtchyan, composer Sarkis Aladjadjyan
- "Hovhannes Shiraz: A Documentary", 2005, director Levon Mkrtchyan
