= Lahore pigeon =

Breed of pigeon

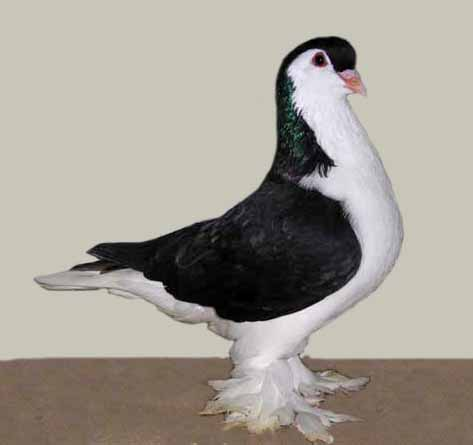
- Black Lahore
- Conservation status: Common
- Country of origin: Pakistan

Traits
- Crest type: None
- Feather ornamentation: foot feathering

Classification
- Australian Breed Group: Group 8 Utility
- US Breed Group: Fancy
- EE Breed Group: Form Pigeons

Notes
- Unusual markings

The Lahore is a breed of fancy pigeon known for its large size. The Lahores, along with the other varieties of domesticated pigeons, are all descendants of the rock pigeon (Columba livia).

== Origin ==
Originating in Lahore in modern-day Pakistan, this bird was also bred in present-day India and Iran. It was imported into Germany around 1880. Lahore pigeon was known in England around the same time, but often under different names. It found its way to the United States by 1922, and a standard of perfection was adopted in 1953. It became popular among pigeon enthusiasts at the beginning of the 1960s. In Iran, Lahores are usually found in the city of Shiraz. These ornamental pigeons from ancient Persia were once bred for their meat, though today they are raised for their plumage and patterns. Their calm and gentle natures also make them ideal as pets.

== Appearance ==
The Lahore is large for a pigeon, approximately 26 centimeters (10 inches) tall and 29 cm (11 in) long. From shoulder to shoulder, it measures 14 cm (5.5 in). Its markings are also unusual: the base color is white, with a secondary color beginning at the juncture of beak and wattle and spreading in an arc over the eyes and across the back and wings. The rump and tail are to be white, though in pigeon shows the majority of attention is paid to the quality of the head, neck, and wing markings.

The neck of purebred Lahore is heavily feathered which leads to a full, broad chest, cheeks are plump, and the beak is "broad and stout and rather blunt at the tip." Feet and legs are feathered so that the bird appears to be wearing thick stockings. Lahore are bred in many different colors, including blue-bar, checkered, red, blue, brown, and black.

== Gallery ==
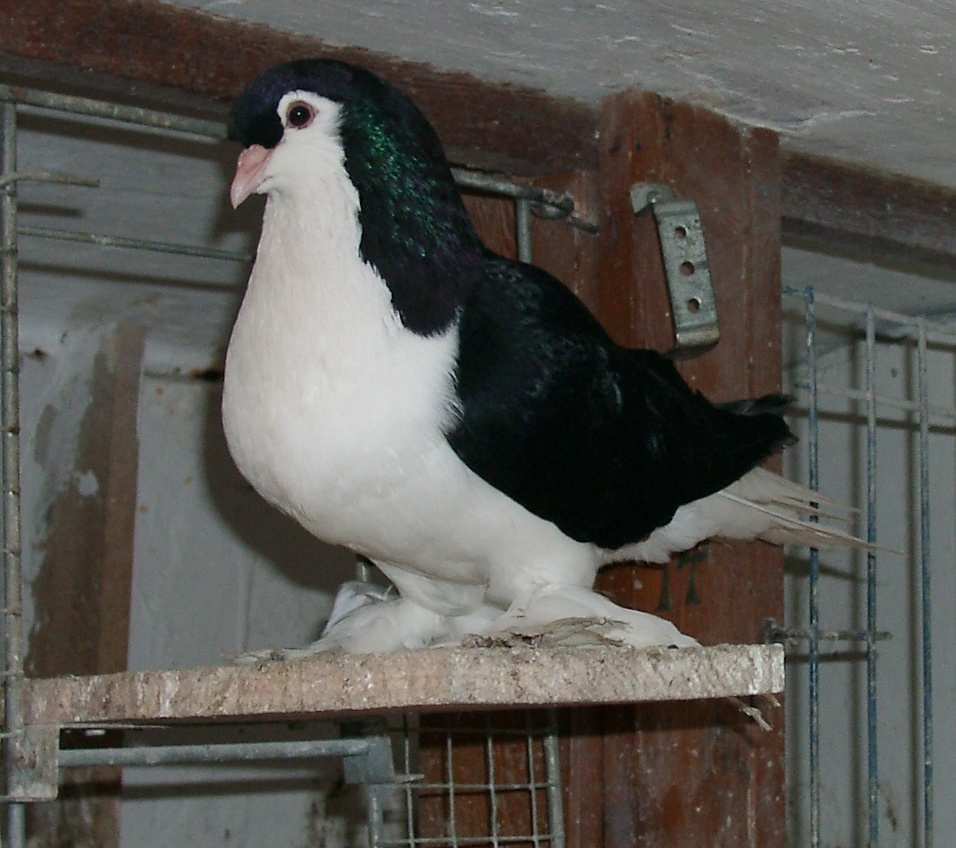
Lahore (black)

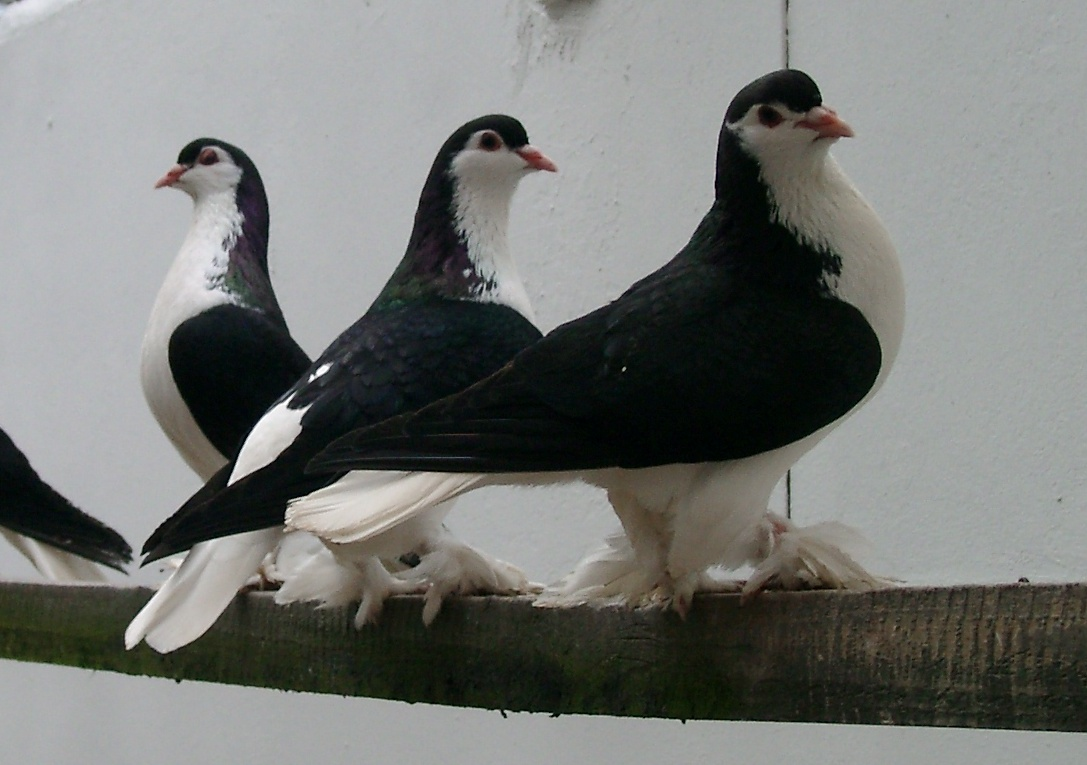
Lahore (black)

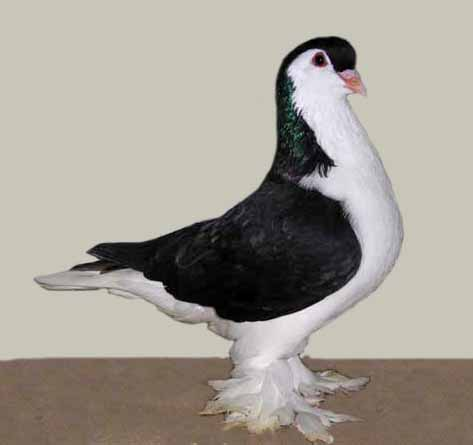
Lahore (black)

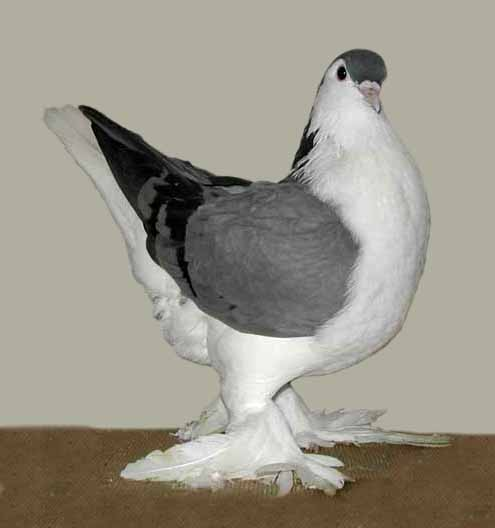
Lahore (blue barred)

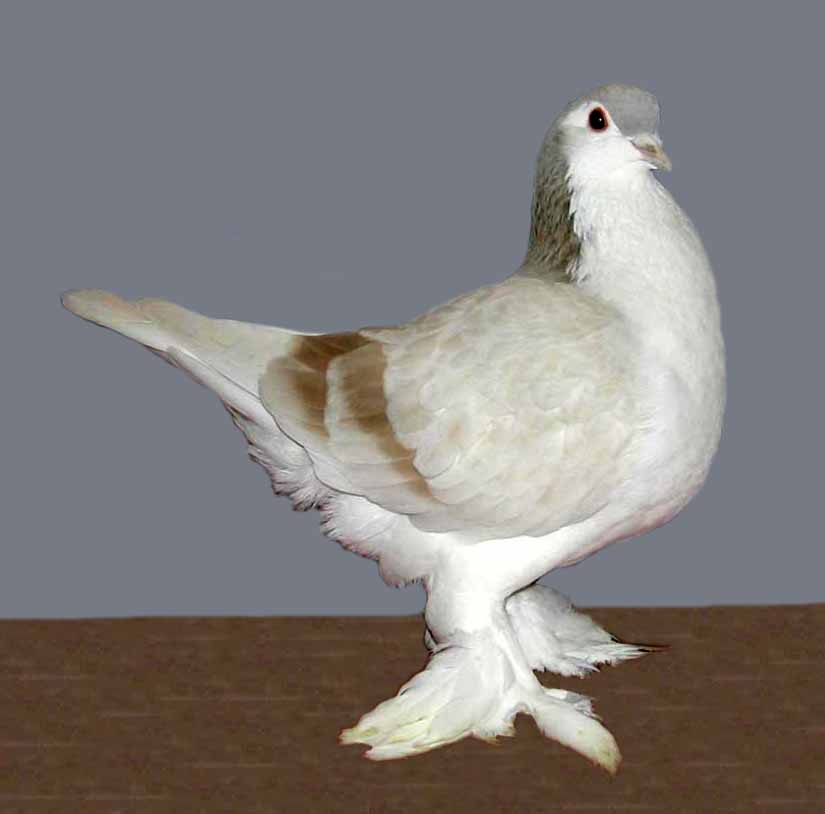
Lahore (cream barred)

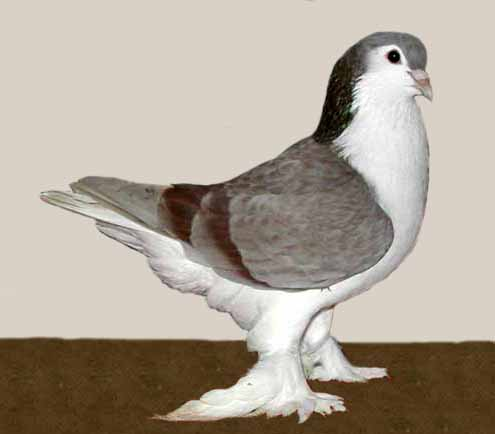
Lahore (mealie)

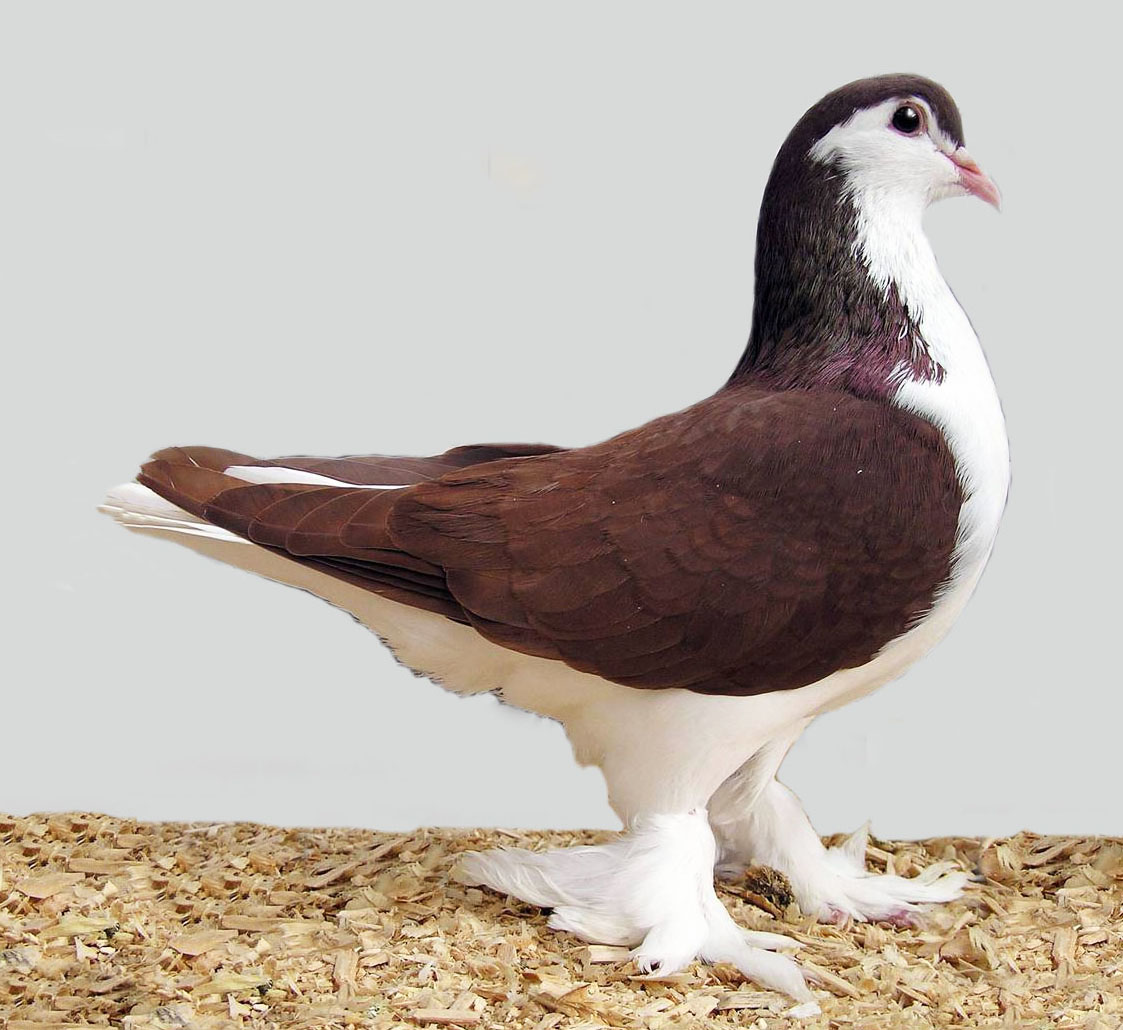
Lahore (red)

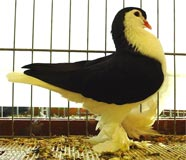
Lahore (schwarz)

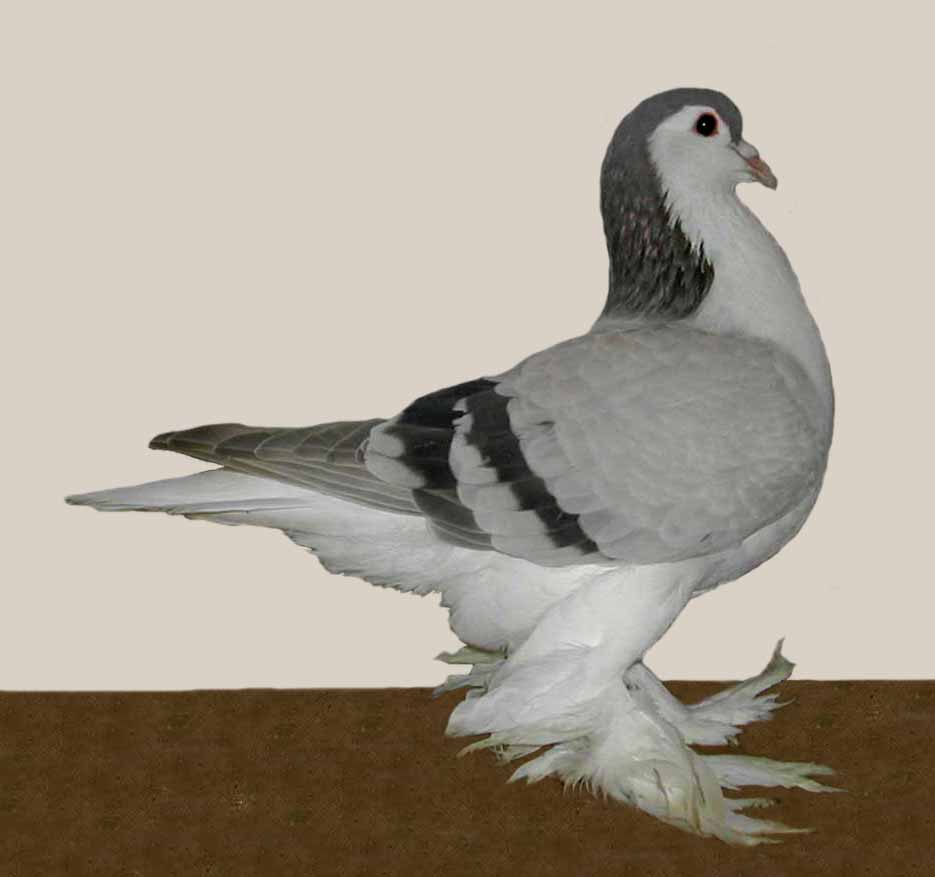
Lahore (silver barred)

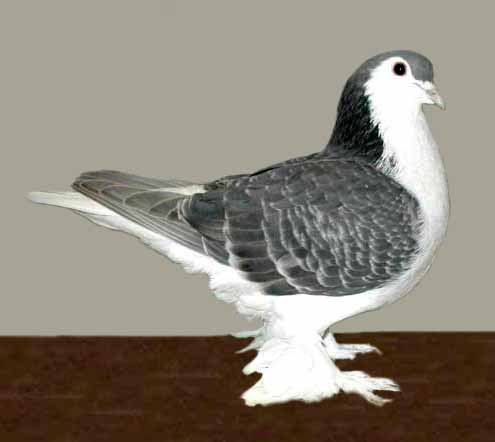
Lahore (silver chequer)

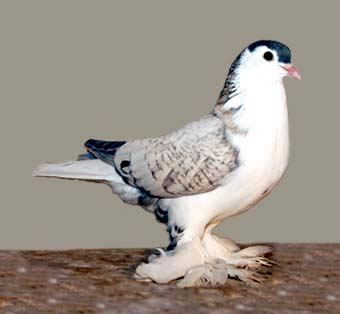
Lahore (stencil)

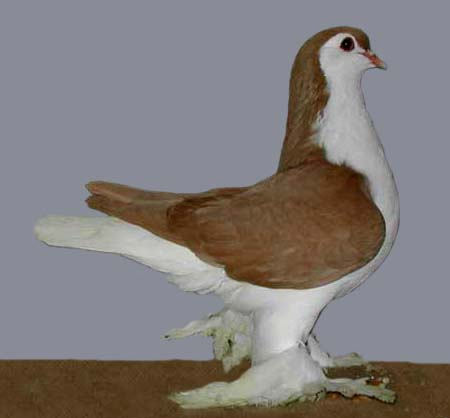
Lahore (yellow)

== See also ==
- Pigeon Diet
- Pigeon Housing
- List of pigeon breeds
