= Qarah Su Rural District (Kermanshah County) =

Rural district in Kermanshah province, Iran

Qarah Su Rural District Persian: دهستان قره سو
- Rural District
- Location within Iran
- Coordinates: 34°10′12″N 47°14′56″E
- Country: Iran
- Province: Kermanshah
- County: Kermanshah
- District: Central

Population (2016)
  - Total: 7,223
- Time zone: UTC+3:30 (IRST)

Qarah Su Rural District (Persian: دهستان قره سو) is in the Central District of Kermanshah County, Kermanshah province, Iran. Its former capital was the village of Kahriz.

== Demographics ==
=== Population ===
At the time of the 2006 National Census, the rural district's population was 10,966 in 2,277 households. There were 14,343 inhabitants in 3,557 households at the following census of 2011. The 2016 census measured the population of the rural district as 7,223 in 1,829 households. The most populous of its 59 villages was Chub Deraz, with 371 people.
