= Qez Qabri =

Qez Qabri or Qez Qebri (Persian: قزقبري), also rendered as Kazkabri, may refer to:

- Qez Qabri-ye Bahador
- Qez Qabri-ye Doktor Habib
- Qez Qabri-ye Ebrahim
- Qez Qabri-ye Jahan Bakhsh
- Qez Qabri-ye Rashid
