= Dar Derafsh =

Dar Derafsh (Persian: داردرفش) may refer to:

- Dar Derafsh-e Ebrahim Beygi
- Dar Derafsh-e Khanomabad
- Dar Derafsh-e Mohammad-e Amin Mirza
- Dar Derafsh-e Qaleh
- Dar Derafsh-e Seyyed Karim
