= Khersabad =

Khersabad (Persian: خرس اباد) may refer to:

- Khersabad-e Bozorg
- Khersabad-e Jafari
