= Choqa Zard =

Choqa Zard (Persian: چقازرد) may refer to:

- Choqa Zard, Kermanshah
- Choqa Zard, Mahidasht, Kermanshah Province
