= Nilüfer =

- Gender: Female

Origin
- Meaning: Lotus
- Region of origin: Turkey

Other names
- Related names: Niloufar

Nilüfer is the Turkish word for "water lily", also means Precious from Persian nîlûfar (نیلوفر), which is ultimately derived from the Sanskrit word for the blue lotus nīḷōtpaḷa (नीळोत्पळ). It is a popular feminine given name in Turkey. It may refer to:

== Given name ==
- Nilüfer Çınar Çorlulu (born 1962), Turkish Woman International Master (WIM) of chess
- Nilüfer Demir (born 1986), Turkish photojournalist
- Nilüfer Elik Yılmaz (born 1962), Turkish politician
- Nilüfer Göle (born 1953), Turkish-French sociologist
- Nilüfer Gürsoy (1921–2024), Turkish philologist, politician and memoirist
- Nilufer Hanımsultan (1916–1989), Ottoman princess
- Nilüfer Hatun (died 1363), mother of Ottoman Sultan Murad I
- Nilüfer Örer (born 1976), Turkish pop singer
- Nilüfer Verdi (born 1956), Turkish jazz pianist
- Nilüfer Yumlu (born 1955), Turkish pop singer whose stage name is simply "Nilüfer"
- Nilüfer Yanya (born 1996), a British-Turkish singer-songwriter from London
