= Nilgün =

Nilgün is a Turkish feminine given name derived from the Persian word nilgun (نیلگون) meaning "indigo", "navy blue", "dark blue", "ultramarine". Nilgün may refer to:

- Nilgün Belgün (born 1953), Turkish actress; see Wish Me Luck (film)
- Nilgün Çelebi (born 1950), Turkish sociologist
- Nilgün Marmara (1958–1987), Turkish poet
- Sevdiye Nilgün Acar (born 1958), Turkish artist

== See also ==
- Nilay, a given name
- Nilüfer (disambiguation)
