= Niloufar (disambiguation) =

Niloufar is a female given name of Persian origin.

Niloufar or variants may also refer to:

- Niloofar (film), a 2008 Iranian film
- Neelofar (film), a 2025 Pakistani film
- Cyclone Nilofar, a 2014 storm

== See also ==
- Neeloo, Nilima, Nilofar, a 2000 Hindi novel by Indian writer Bhisham Sahni
- Sarab-e Nilufar, a village in Iran
- Shahrak-e Sarab Nilufar, a village in Iran
