= Nilüfer (disambiguation) =

Nilüfer is a Turkish feminine given name, the Turkish version of Nilufar. It may also refer to:

== Places ==
- Nilüfer, Bursa, an urban district of Bursa Province in Turkey
- Nilüfer River, the classical Odrysses, near Bursa, Turkey

== Other uses ==
- Bursa Nilüfer S.A.Ş., a sports club in Nilüfer, Bursa, Turkey
- Nilüfer Belediyespor, a multi-sports club in Nilüfer, Bursa, Turkey
- Nilüfer Belediyespor Women's Volleyball Team, women's volleyball side of Nilüfer Belediyespor in Bursa, Turkey
- Nilüfer Dam, a dam on Nilüfer River in Bursa, Turkey
