= Deh-e Qasem =

Deh-e Qasem ده قاسم
- Village
- Location within Iran
- Coordinates: 34°27′14″N 46°48′35″E
- Country: Iran
- Province: Kermanshah
- County: Kermanshah
- Bakhsh: Central
- Rural District: Baladarband

Population (2006)
  - Total: 104
- Time zone: UTC+3:30 (IRST)
  - Summer (DST): UTC+4:30 (IRDT)

Deh-e Qasem (Persian: ده قاسم, also Romanized as Deh-e Qāsem) is a village in Baladarband Rural District, in the Central District of Kermanshah County, Kermanshah Province, Iran. At the 2006 census, its population was 104, in 26 families.
