= Tanur Dul =

Tanur Dul تنوردول
- Village
- Location within Iran
- Coordinates: 34°26′00″N 46°49′30″E
- Country: Iran
- Province: Kermanshah
- County: Kermanshah
- Bakhsh: Central
- Rural District: Baladarband

Population (2006)
  - Total: 271
- Time zone: UTC+3:30 (IRST)
  - Summer (DST): UTC+4:30 (IRDT)

Tanur Dul (Persian: تنوردول, also Romanized as Tanūr Dūl) is a village in Baladarband Rural District, in the Central District of Kermanshah County, Kermanshah Province, Iran. At the 2006 census, its population was 271, in 63 families.
