= Veys Ahmad =

Veys Ahmad ويس احمد
- Village
- Location within Iran
- Coordinates: 34°26′23″N 46°49′30″E
- Country: Iran
- Province: Kermanshah
- County: Kermanshah
- Bakhsh: Central
- Rural District: Baladarband

Population (2006)
  - Total: 135
- Time zone: UTC+3:30 (IRST)
  - Summer (DST): UTC+4:30 (IRDT)

Veys Ahmad (Persian: ويس احمد, also Romanized as Veys Aḩmad) is a village in Baladarband Rural District, in the Central District of Kermanshah County, Kermanshah Province, Iran. At the 2006 census, its population was 135, in 31 families.
