= Dar Derafsh-e Khanomabad =

Dar Derafsh-e Khanomabad داردرفش خانم آباد
- Village
- Location within Iran
- Coordinates: 34°29′45″N 46°47′51″E
- Country: Iran
- Province: Kermanshah
- County: Kermanshah
- Bakhsh: Central
- Rural District: Baladarband

Population (2006)
  - Total: 72
- Time zone: UTC+3:30 (IRST)
  - Summer (DST): UTC+4:30 (IRDT)

Dar Derafsh-e Khanomabad (Persian: داردرفش خانم آباد, also Romanized as Dār Derafsh-e Khānomābād) is a village in Baladarband Rural District, in the Central District of Kermanshah County, Kermanshah Province, Iran. At the 2006 census, its population was 72, in 18 families.
