= Dar Derafsh-e Ebrahim Beygi =

Dar Derafsh-e Ebrahim Beygi داردرفش ابراهيم بيگي
- Village
- Location within Iran
- Coordinates: 34°30′09″N 46°47′29″E
- Country: Iran
- Province: Kermanshah
- County: Kermanshah
- Bakhsh: Central
- Rural District: Baladarband

Population (2006)
  - Total: 130
- Time zone: UTC+3:30 (IRST)
  - Summer (DST): UTC+4:30 (IRDT)

Dar Derafsh-e Ebrahim Beygi (Persian: داردرفش ابراهيم بيگي, also Romanized as Dār Derafsh-e Ebrāhīm Beygī) is a village in Baladarband Rural District, in the Central District of Kermanshah County, Kermanshah Province, Iran. At the 2006 census, its population was 130, in 25 families.
