= Choqa Zard, Kermanshah =

Chegha Zard چقازرد
- Village
- Location within Iran
- Coordinates: 34°22′54″N 46°52′58″E
- Country: Iran
- Province: Kermanshah
- County: Kermanshah
- Bakhsh: Central
- Rural District: Baladarband

Population (2006)
  - Total: 369
- Time zone: UTC+3:30 (IRST)
  - Summer (DST): UTC+4:30 (IRDT)

Chegha Zard (Persian: چقازرد, also Romanized as Cheghā Zard) is a village in Baladarband Rural District, in the Central District of Kermanshah County, Kermanshah Province, Iran. At the 2006 census, its population was 369, in 93 families.
