= Shahrak-e Sarab Nilufar =

Shahrak-e Sarab Nilufar شهرك سراب نيلوفر
- Village
- Country: Iran
- Province: Kermanshah
- County: Kermanshah
- Bakhsh: Central
- Rural District: Baladarband

Population (2006)
  - Total: 1,018
- Time zone: UTC+3:30 (IRST)
  - Summer (DST): UTC+4:30 (IRDT)

Shahrak-e Sarab Nilufar (Persian: شهرك سراب نيلوفر, also Romanized as Shahrak-e Sarāb Nīlūfar) is a village in Baladarband Rural District, in the Central District of Kermanshah County, Kermanshah Province, Iran. At the 2006 census, its population was 1,018, in 249 families.
