= Dar Derafsh-e Seyyed Karim =

Dar Derafsh-e Seyyed Karim, Iran داردرفش سيدكريم
- Village
- Location within Iran
- Coordinates: 34°31′00″N 46°45′00″E
- Country: Iran
- Province: Kermanshah
- County: Kermanshah
- Bakhsh: Central
- Rural District: Baladarband

Population (2006)
  - Total: 63
- Time zone: UTC+3:30 (IRST)
  - Summer (DST): UTC+4:30 (IRDT)

Dar Derafsh-e Seyyed Karim (Persian: داردرفش سيدكريم, also Romanized as Dār Derafsh-e Seyyed Karīm) is a village in Baladarband Rural District, in the Central District of Kermanshah County, Kermanshah Province, Iran. At the 2006 census, its population was 63, in 11 families.
