= Qez Qabri-ye Jahan Bakhsh =

Qez Qabri-ye Jahan Bakhsh قزقبري جهان بخش
- Village
- Country: Iran
- Province: Kermanshah
- County: Kermanshah
- Bakhsh: Central
- Rural District: Baladarband

Population (2006)
  - Total: 34
- Time zone: UTC+3:30 (IRST)
  - Summer (DST): UTC+4:30 (IRDT)

Qez Qabri-ye Jahan Bakhsh (Persian: قزقبري جهان بخش, also Romanized as Qez Qabrī-ye Jahān Bakhsh) is a village in Baladarband Rural District, in the Central District of Kermanshah County, Kermanshah Province, Iran. At the 2006 census, its population was 34, in 10 families.
