= Khersabad-e Jafari =

Khersabad-e Jafari خرس ابادجعفري
- Village
- Location within Iran
- Coordinates: 34°28′55″N 46°44′28″E
- Country: Iran
- Province: Kermanshah
- County: Kermanshah
- Bakhsh: Central
- Rural District: Baladarband

Population (2006)
  - Total: 77
- Time zone: UTC+3:30 (IRST)
  - Summer (DST): UTC+4:30 (IRDT)

Khersabad-e Jafari (Persian: خرس ابادجعفري, also Romanized as Khersābād-e Ja‘farī; also known as Āqā Ja‘farī and Khersābād-e Āqā Ja‘far) is a village in Baladarband Rural District, in the Central District of Kermanshah County, Kermanshah Province, Iran. At the 2006 census, its population was 77, in 16 families.
