= Niloufar =

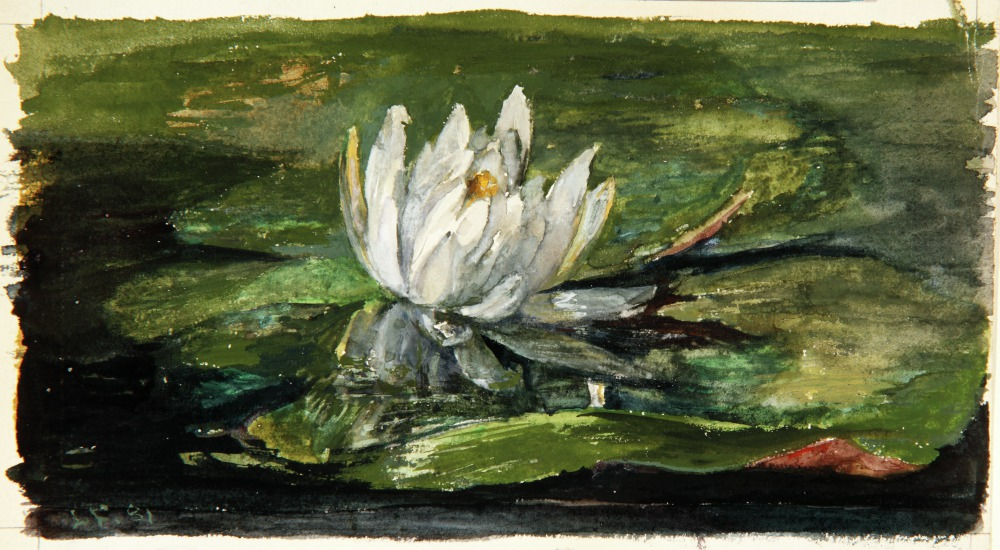
- Water Lily in the Sunlight by John La Farge.
- Gender: Female

Origin
- Origin: Persian
- Meaning: Lotus or water lily
- Region of origin: Iran, Tajikistan, Afghanistan, Turkey, Azerbaijan, Uzbekistan, Pakistan

Other names
- Related names: Nilüfer

Niloufar, Nilophur, Nelofar, Nilofar, Nilufar, Niloofar, Neelofar, Neiloufar or Nîlûfar (Persian: نیلوفر), meaning 'precious', 'rare', 'blue lotus', 'Nymphaea' or 'water lily' is a female given name of Persian origin, ultimately from Sanskrit: नीलोत्पल (nīlōtpala, 'blue lotus').

Nounoufar (Armenian: Նունուֆար) is the Armenian version of it.

== People ==
- Niloofar Ardalan, (born 1985), Iranian footballer, captain of the Iranian national women's football team
- Nilofar Bakhtiar (born 1957), Pakistani politician and public official
- Niloufar Bayani, (born 1986), Iranian wildlife conservation biology researcher and activist.
- Niloofar Beyzaie (born 1967), Iranian dramaturge, theatre director and playwright
- Nilufer Hanımsultan, (1916-1989), Princess of Turkey by birth and princess of Hyderabad State by marriage.
- Nelufar Hedayat, (born 1988), British journalist and presenter
- Nilufar Mamadalieva, biochemist from Uzbekistan
- Neelofa (Neelofa Noor, born 1989), Malaysian actress, television host
- Nelofer Pazira (born 1973), Canadian filmmaker, author, and journalist
- Niloofar Rahmani, Afghan lady air force pilot
- Nilofar Sakhi, Afghan women's rights activist
- Niloufar Salehi, American-Iranian computer scientist
- Nilofar Suhrawardy, Indian journalist and author
- Niloufar Talebi, British-born Iranian-American author, literary translator, and multidisciplinary artist
- Nilufar Usmonova, Uzbek singer and actress
- Nilufar Yasmin, Bangladeshi singer

== See also ==
- Nilüfer (disambiguation), the Turkish version of the name
