= Qez Qabri-ye Doktor Habib =

Village in Iran

Qez Qabri-ye Doktor Habib قزقبري دكترحبيب
- Village
- Location within Iran
- Coordinates: 34°28′23″N 46°44′10″E
- Country: Iran
- Province: Kermanshah
- County: Kermanshah
- Bakhsh: Central
- Rural District: Baladarband

Population (2006)
  - Total: 96
- Time zone: UTC+3:30 (IRST)
  - Summer (DST): UTC+4:30 (IRDT)

Qez Qabri-ye Doktor Habib (Persian: قزقبري دكترحبيب, also Romanized as Qez Qabrī-ye Doktor Ḩabīb and Qez Qebrī-ye Doktor Ḩabīb; also known as Kazkabrī, Qez Qabrī, and Qez Qebrī-ye Chahār) is a village in Baladarband Rural District, in the Central District of Kermanshah County, Kermanshah province, Iran. At the 2006 census, its population was 96, in 22 families.
