= Qez Qabri-ye Bahador =

Qez Qabri-ye Bahador قزقبري بهادر
- Village
- Location within Iran
- Coordinates: 34°28′11″N 46°43′57″E
- Country: Iran
- Province: Kermanshah
- County: Kermanshah
- Bakhsh: Central
- Rural District: Baladarband

Population (2006)
  - Total: 54
- Time zone: UTC+3:30 (IRST)
  - Summer (DST): UTC+4:30 (IRDT)

Qez Qabri-ye Bahador (Persian: قزقبري بهادر, also Romanized as Qez Qabrī-ye Bahādor and Qez Qebrī-ye Bahādor; also known as Qez Qabrī-ye Bahādorī and Qez Qebrī-ye Seh) is a village in Baladarband Rural District, in the Central District of Kermanshah County, Kermanshah Province, Iran. At the 2006 census, its population was 54, in 10 families.
