= Qez Qabri-ye Rashid =

Qez Qabri-ye Rashid قزقنبري رشيد
- Village
- Location within Iran
- Coordinates: 34°27′52″N 46°44′05″E
- Country: Iran
- Province: Kermanshah
- County: Kermanshah
- Bakhsh: Central
- Rural District: Baladarband

Population (2006)
  - Total: 64
- Time zone: UTC+3:30 (IRST)
  - Summer (DST): UTC+4:30 (IRDT)

Qez Qabri-ye Rashid (Persian: قزقنبري رشيد, also Romanized as Qez Qabrī-ye Rashīd; also known as Qez Qabrī-ye Rashīd ‘Alī, Qez Qebrī-ye Do, and Qez Qebrī-ye Rashīd ‘Alī) is a village in Baladarband Rural District, in the Central District of Kermanshah County, Kermanshah Province, Iran. At the 2006 census, its population was 64, in 17 families.
