= 2014 North Indian Ocean cyclone season =

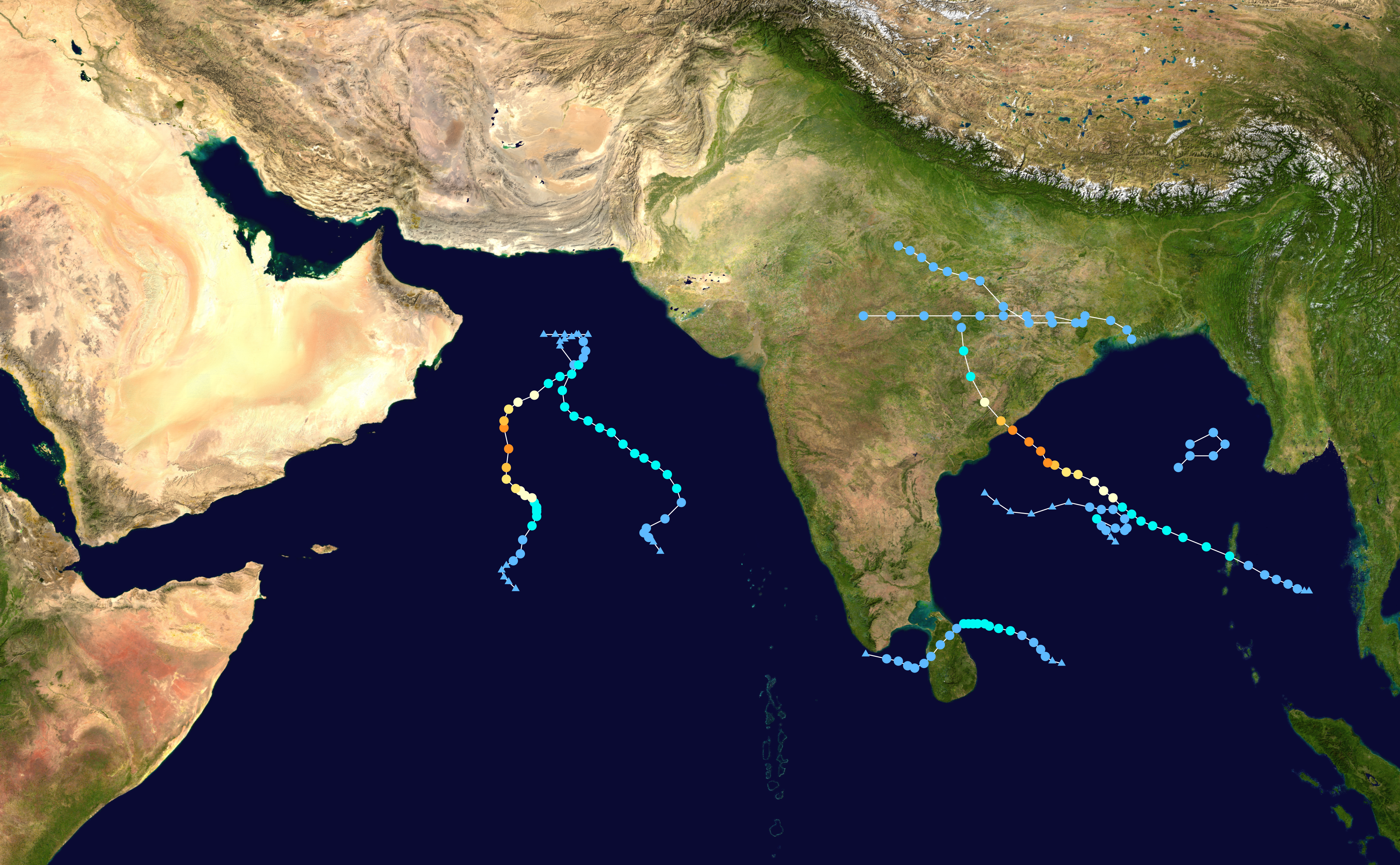
- Season summary map

Seasonal boundaries
- First system formed: January 4, 2014
- Last system dissipated: November 8, 2014

Strongest storm
- Name: Nilofar
  - Maximum winds: 205 km/h (125 mph) (3-minute sustained)
  - Lowest pressure: 950 hPa (mbar)

Seasonal statistics
- Depressions: 8
- Deep depressions: 5
- Cyclonic storms: 3
- Severe cyclonic storms: 2
- Very severe cyclonic storms: 2
- Extremely severe cyclonic storms: 2
- Total fatalities: 179 total
- Total damage: $11 billion (2014 USD) (Fifth-costliest North Indian Ocean cyclone season on record)

Related articles
- 2014 Atlantic hurricane season; 2014 Pacific hurricane season; 2014 Pacific typhoon season

The 2014 North Indian Ocean cyclone season was an event in the annual cycle of tropical cyclone formation. The season included two very severe cyclonic storms, both in October, and one other named cyclonic storm, classified according to the tropical cyclone intensity scale of the India Meteorological Department. Cyclone Hudhud was believed to have killed 116, and delivered $11 billion in damages to Eastern India.

The scope of this article is limited to the Indian Ocean in the Northern Hemisphere, east of the Horn of Africa and west of the Malay Peninsula. There are two main seas in the North Indian Ocean — the Arabian Sea to the west of the Indian subcontinent, abbreviated ARB by the India Meteorological Department (IMD); and the Bay of Bengal to the east, abbreviated BOB by the IMD. The systems that form over land are abbreviated as LAND by the IMD. The official Regional Specialized Meteorological Centre in this basin is the IMD, while the Joint Typhoon Warning Centerof the United States releases unofficial advisories. On average, four to six storms form in this basin every season.

== Season summary ==
Under the influence of an active Intertropical Convergence Zone, the season got off to one of its earliest starts on record, with a depression developing over the Andaman Sea during January 4. Over the next couple of days the system moved westwards and made landfall on Sri Lanka, where it weakened into an area of low pressure. Over the next few months the basin remained quiet, before the precursor cyclonic circulation to Depression BOB 02 developed during May 18. As the cyclonic circulation developed it helped the southwest monsoon, advance into the Andaman Sea and parts of the Bay of Bengal, before it developed into a depression during May 21. The depression was short lived and weakened into a remnant low, over the Bay of Bengal during May 23. The southwest monsoon was subsequently delayed by six days setting in over the Indian state of Kerala and eventually moved over the state during June 6. Over the next few days the monsoon set in further over the Bay of Bengal, while it was enhanced over the Arabian Sea by the formation of Cyclonic Storm Nanauk. By June 18, the monsoon covered most of the North Indian Ocean and parts of Gujarat, Konkan & Goa, Odisha, Jharkhand, Bihar and Gangetic West Bengal.

On June 19, an eastward propagation of the Madden–Julian oscillation over the maritime continent, led to the season's first area of low pressure developing over coastal parts of Bangladesh. This helped the monsoon set in over India's north-eastern states and advance in to central India. During the final week of June the monsoon weakened, which led to the emergence of heatwave conditions over eastern parts of coastal India. The monsoon subsequently started to revive as it interacted with the mid-latitude westerlies and it advanced into parts of the Himalayas and northwest India by July 1. During the first week of July an area of low pressure and several upper air cyclonic circulations caused the monsoon to advance further, where it covered the whole of Haryana, Madhya Pradesh, Punjab and Uttar Pradesh by July 7. Over the next two weeks a trough of low pressure and a cyclonic circulation, helped advance the monsoon into remaining parts of the Arabian Sea, central and north-western India. The India Meteorological Department (IMD) subsequently declared that the monsoon covered the whole of India on July 17, which was about two days later that normal.

A change in the lower tropospheric circulation pattern over Rajasthan between September 16–17, from cyclonic to anti cyclonic, which indicated to forecasters that the southwest monsoon had started to withdraw from the region. During September 23, after Rajasthan had remained mainly dry since September 17, the IMD declared that the withdrawal of the southwest monsoon had commenced. Over the next couple of weeks the monsoon gradually withdrew from the Arabian Sea, north-western and central parts of India, before Very Severe Cyclonic Storm Hudhud formed on October 7. After Hudhud had moved northwards and weakened into an area of low pressure, the southwest monsoon withdrew from the rest of India, Sri Lanka and the North Indian Ocean by October 18. During October 18, northeast monsoon rains over Tamil Nadu and neighbouring peninsular India commenced.

== Systems ==
=== Depression BOB 01 ===
- Depression (IMD)
- Tropical storm (SSHWS)
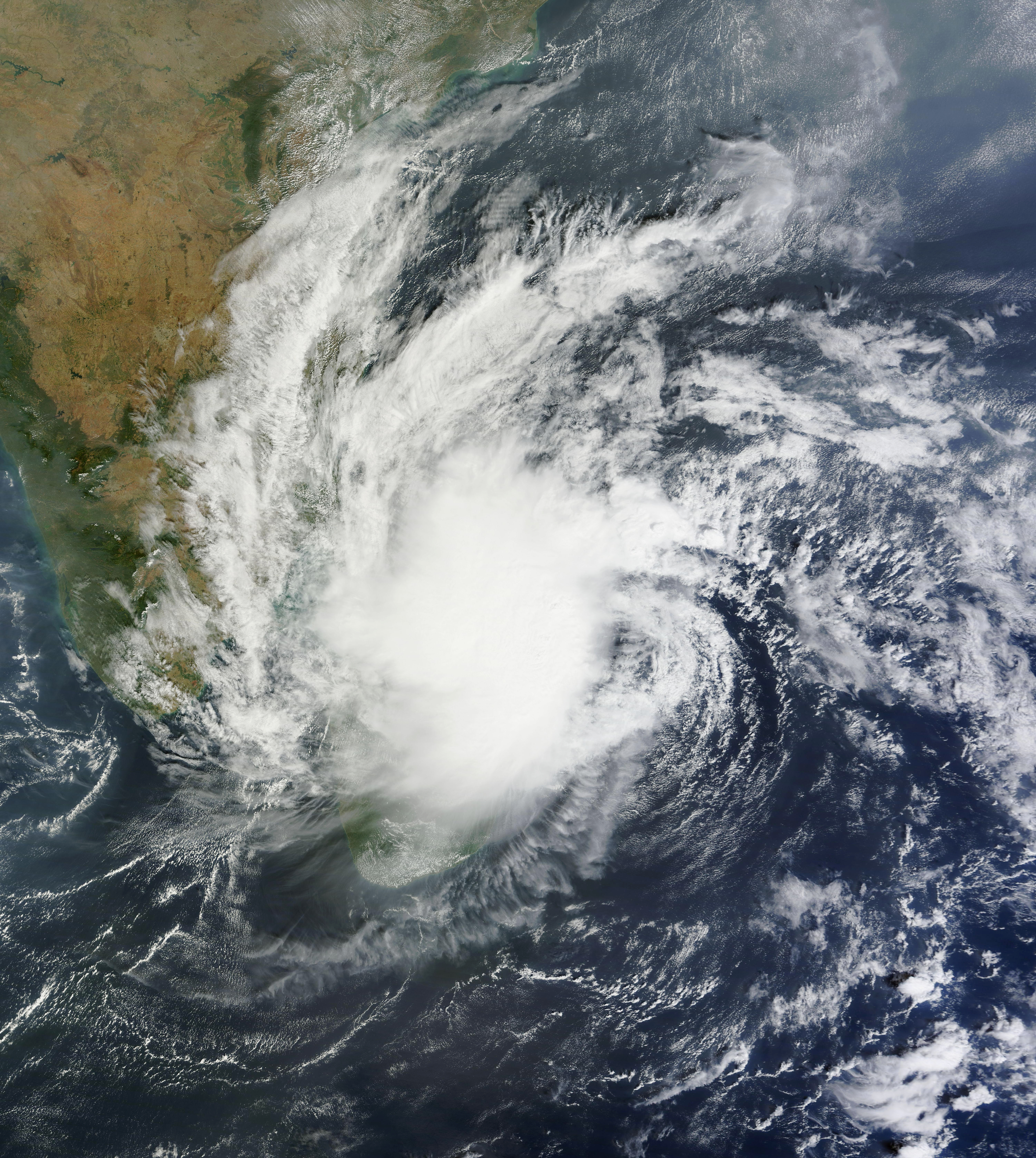
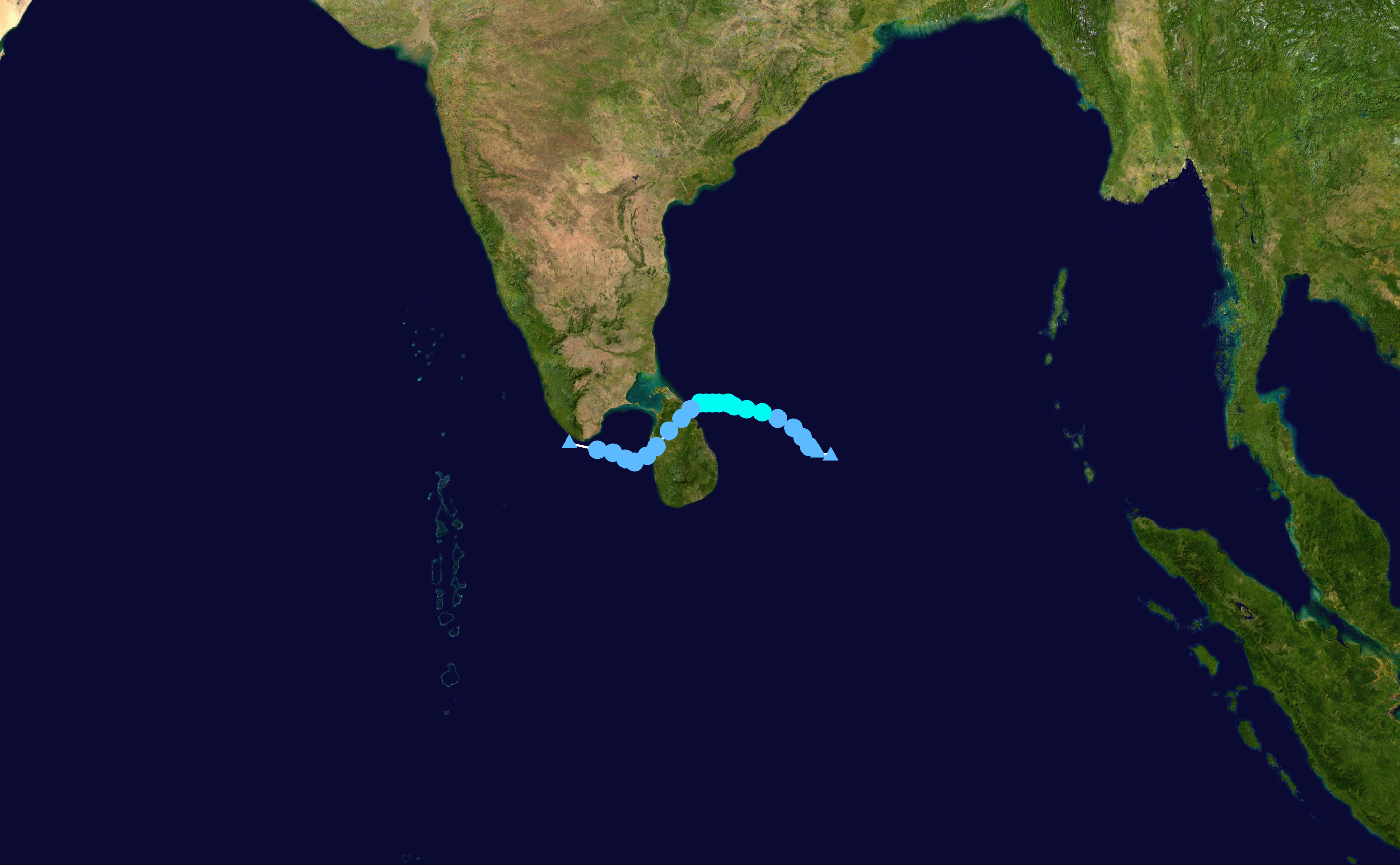
- Duration: January 4 – January 7
- Peak intensity: 45 km/h (30 mph) (3-min); 1004 hPa (mbar)

Under the influence of an active Intertropical Convergence Zone (ITCZ), a low-pressure system formed over the Bay of Bengal on January 2, slowly organizing as it moved into a favorable environment. A Tropical Cyclone Formation Alert (TCFA) was issued by the Joint Typhoon Warning Center (JTWC). On January 4, the India Meteorological Department (IMD) commenced its advisories on the storm, designating it Depression BOB 01, followed by the JTWC classifying the storm a tropical cyclone. The storm intensified a little further, before it made landfall over north Sri Lanka on January 6 and degenerating into a low-pressure area during the following day.

The storm brought moderate rainfall to northern Sri Lanka. On January 6, Vavuniya reported the highest amount of rainfall of 210 mm (8.3 in), followed by Puttalam, Anuradhapura and Trincomalee receiving 50 mm (2.0 in) each. The depression was the first storm in the North Indian Ocean to form in the month of January since Cyclonic Storm Hibaru in 2005.

=== Depression BOB 02 ===
- Depression (IMD)
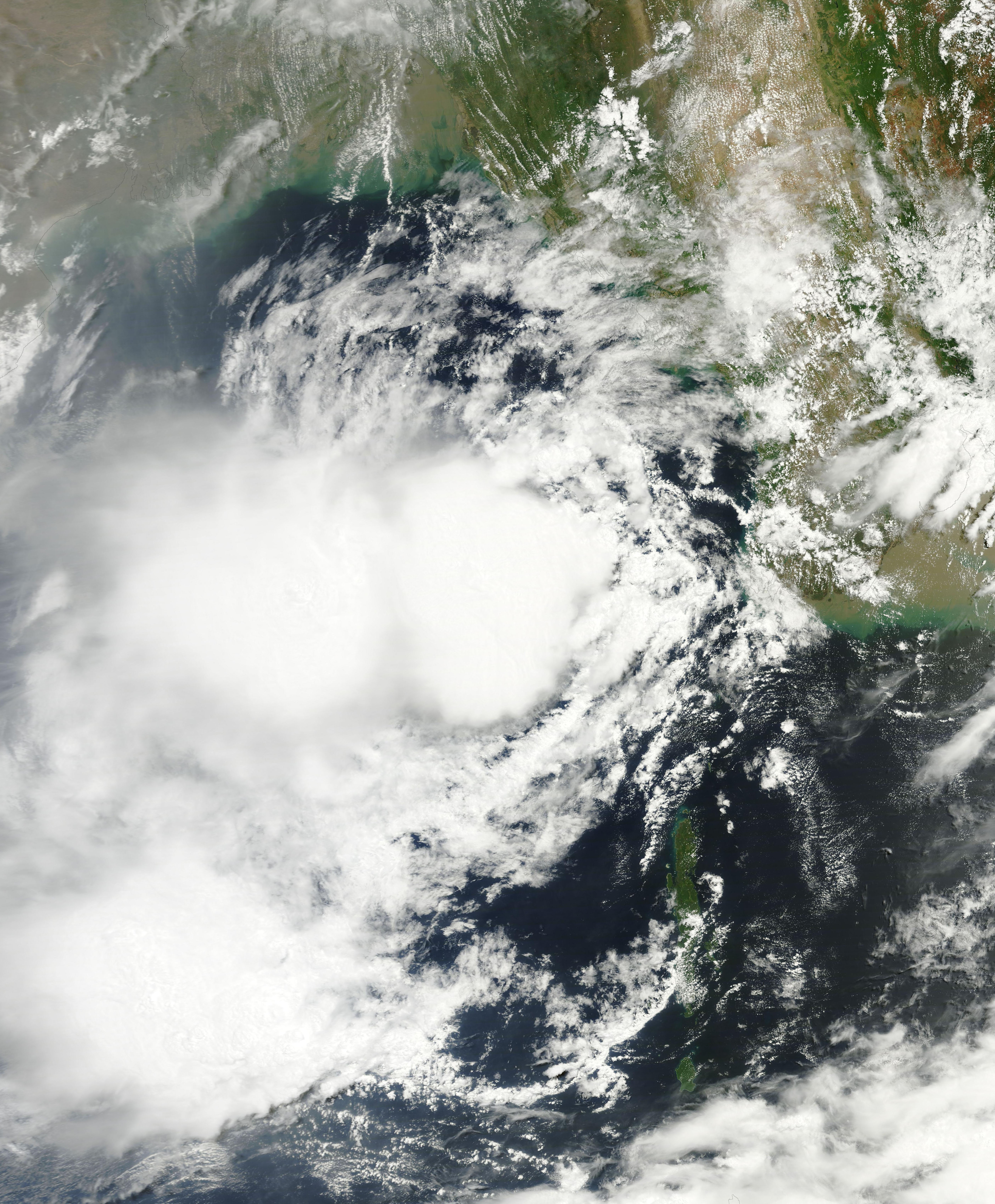
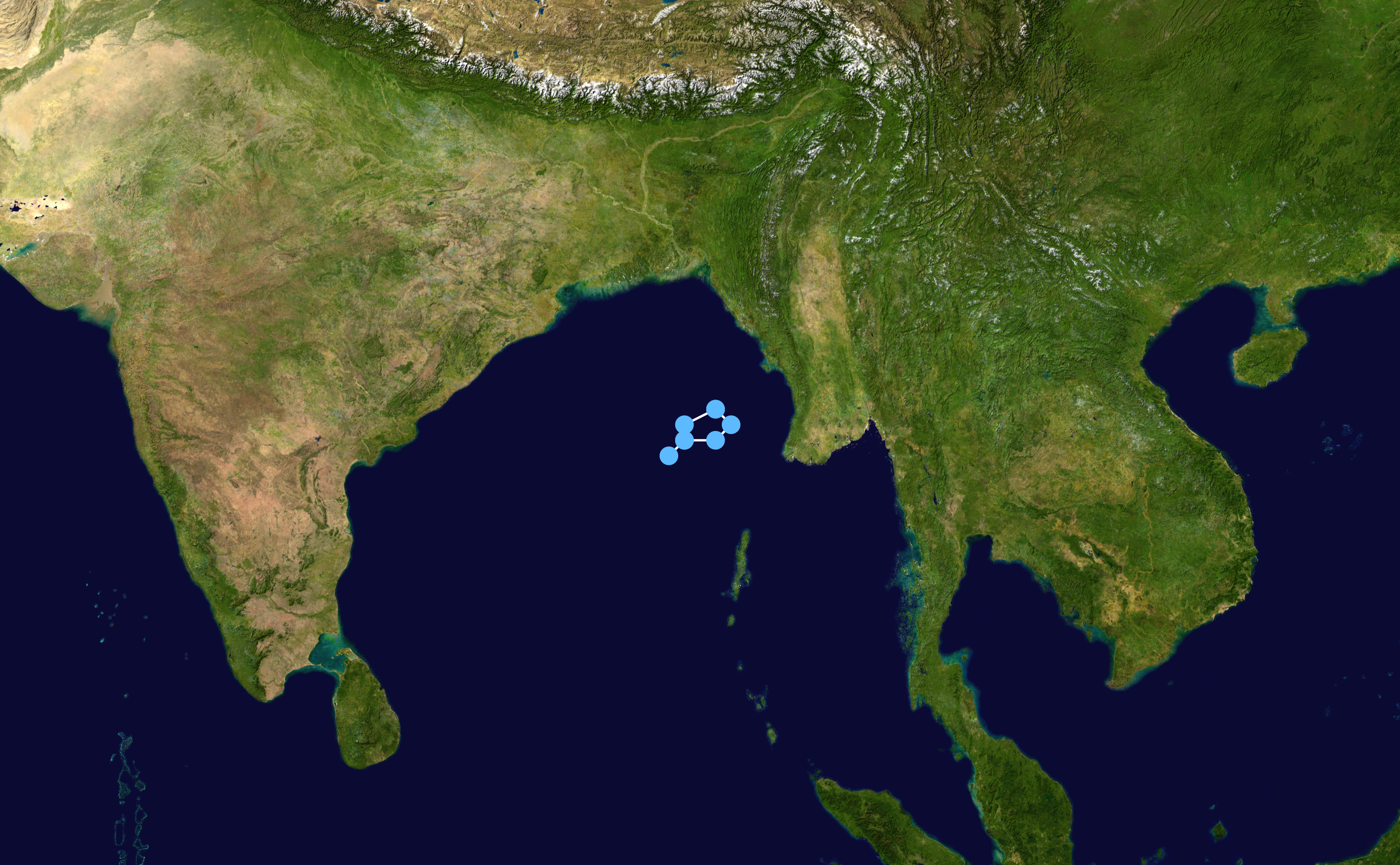
- Duration: May 21 – May 23
- Peak intensity: 45 km/h (30 mph) (3-min); 1000 hPa (mbar)

A low-pressure area formed over the Bay of Bengal on May 19. It slowly consolidated, prompting IMD to classify it as a Depression on May 21, followed by JTWC issuing a Tropical Cyclone Formation Alert (TCFA) in the following hours. Over the following day, the depression continued moving north-northeastwards towards an area of high vertical wind shear. The JTWC cancelled the TCFA issued for the system, stating that high wind shear had caused the convection to start dissipating. The storm continued losing convection, until it weakened into a well-marked low-pressure area on May 23. The remnant system persisted for several more days, moving over the Indian state of Odisha late on May 25, before dissipating on the following day.

The depression brought much-needed relief to Odisha which had been suffering from a heat wave that claimed at least 22 lives. Coastal areas previously reporting temperatures near 40 °C (104 °F) fell below 30 °C (86 °F) during the system's passage. Heavy rains affected many areas, including 208 mm (8.2 in) at Bhawanipatna which experienced temperatures of 45 °C (113 °F) days earlier. The highest 24‑hour rainfall was 210 mm (8.3 in) in Baleswar. Six districts were placed under a flood alert due to the rains. A bridge near Hatadahi in the Rayagada district was swept away by flooding.

=== Cyclonic Storm Nanauk ===
- Cyclonic storm (IMD)
- Tropical storm (SSHWS)
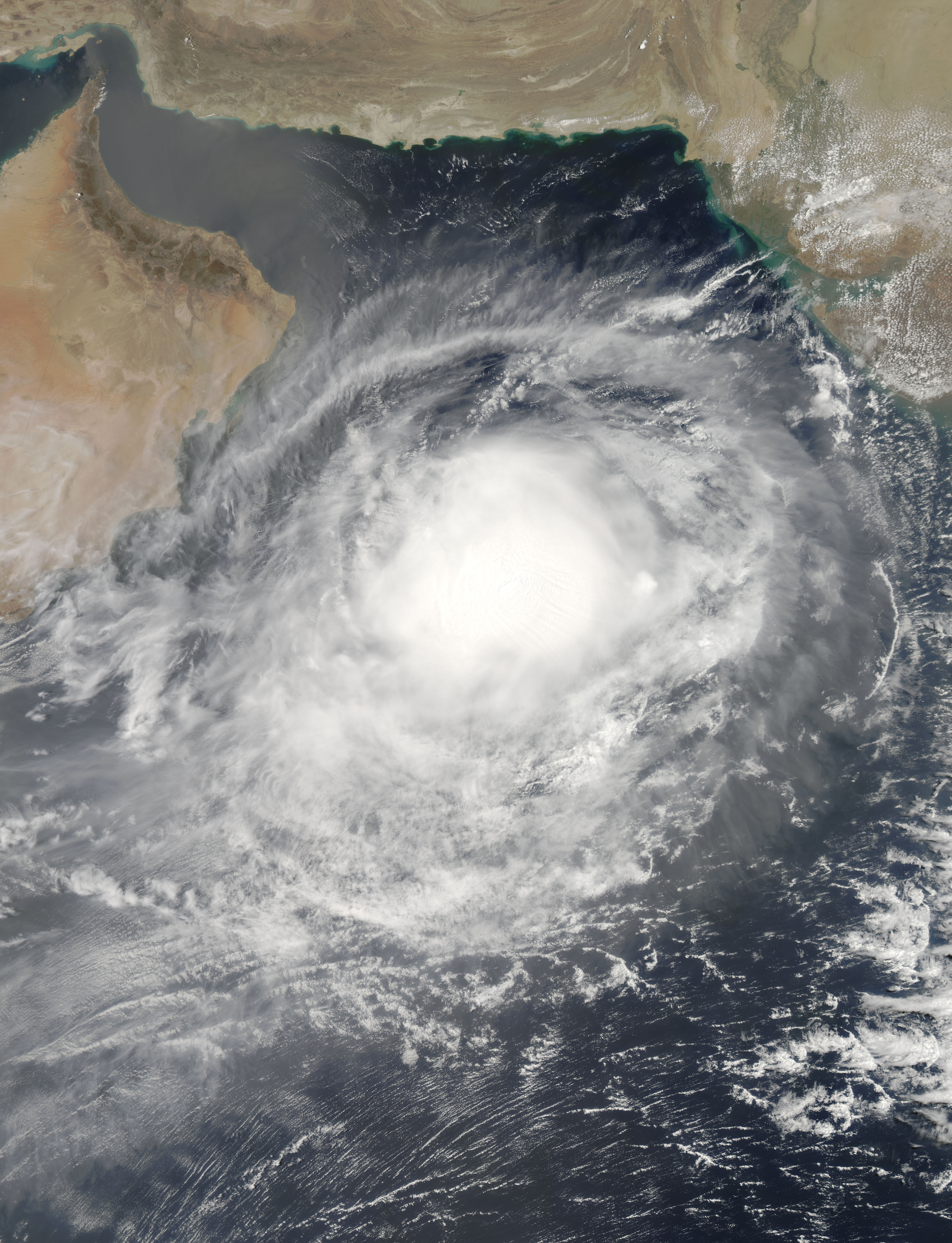
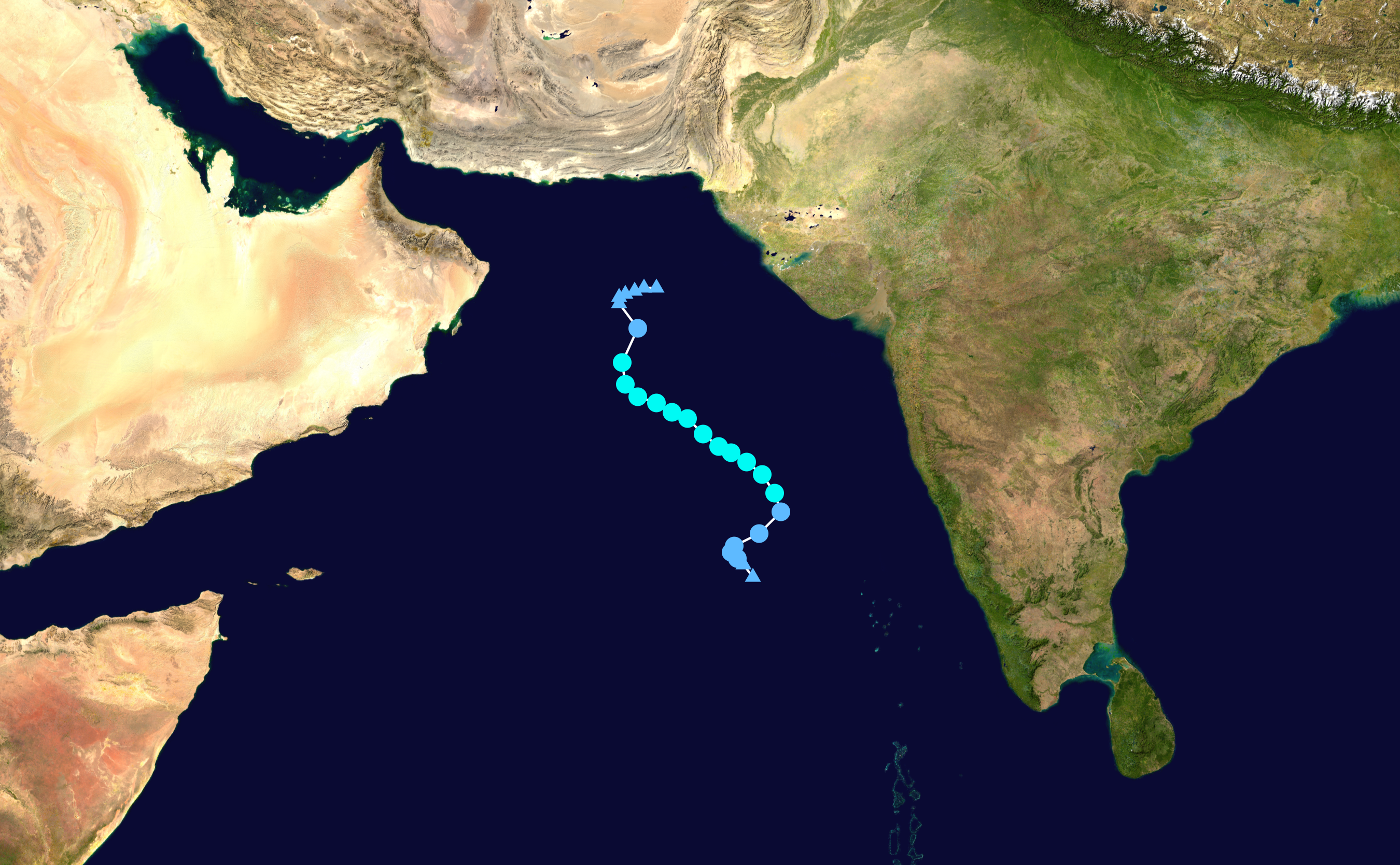
- Duration: June 10 – June 14
- Peak intensity: 85 km/h (50 mph) (3-min); 986 hPa (mbar)

Under the influence of an active southwest monsoon surge, a low-pressure area formed over the Arabian Sea on June 9. It slowly organized, and was classified tropical storm 02A by the JTWC in the early hours of June 10. In the following hours, the IMD upgraded the storm to a depression and subsequently a deep depression, designating it "ARB 01". On June 11, the system was upgraded to Cyclonic Storm intensity and was named Nanauk (Note: The name Nanauk (Burmese: နွားနောက်, [nwánàʊk]) was contributed by Myanmar and refers to the gayal (Bos frontalis) in Burmese.) by the IMD as it continued to intensify under favorable environmental conditions. The following day, Nanauk reached its peak intensity with a minimum central pressure of 986 hPa (29.12 inHg) and 3-minute sustained winds of 85 km/h (53 mph). As it tracked further northwestwards, the storm encountered moderate vertical wind shear, dry air and low sea surface temperatures, causing it to weaken rapidly into a Depression on June 13. A low-level steering flow deflected the storm to take a northward path, and the system was last noted as a well-marked low-pressure area on June 14.

=== Depression LAND 01 ===
- Depression (IMD)
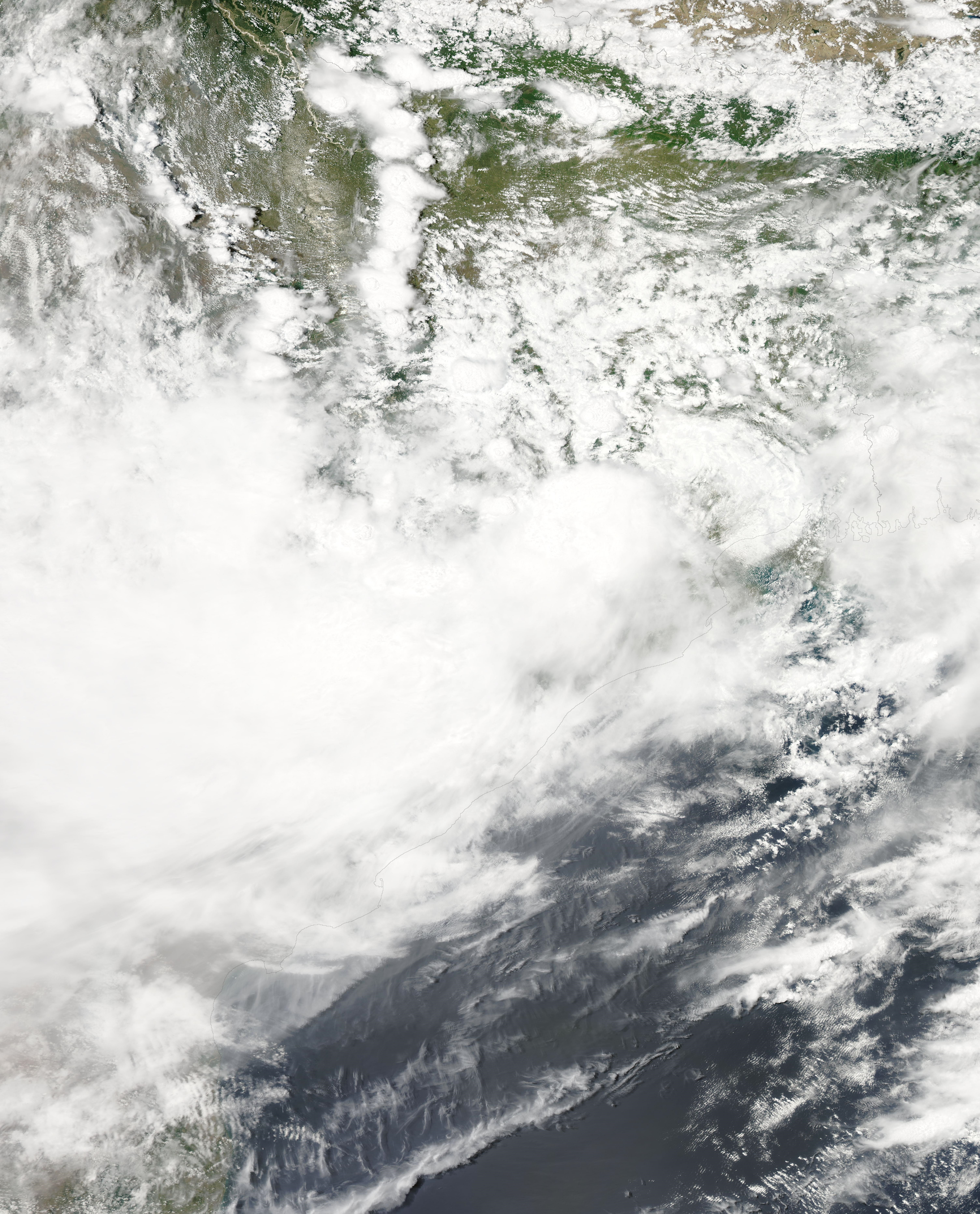
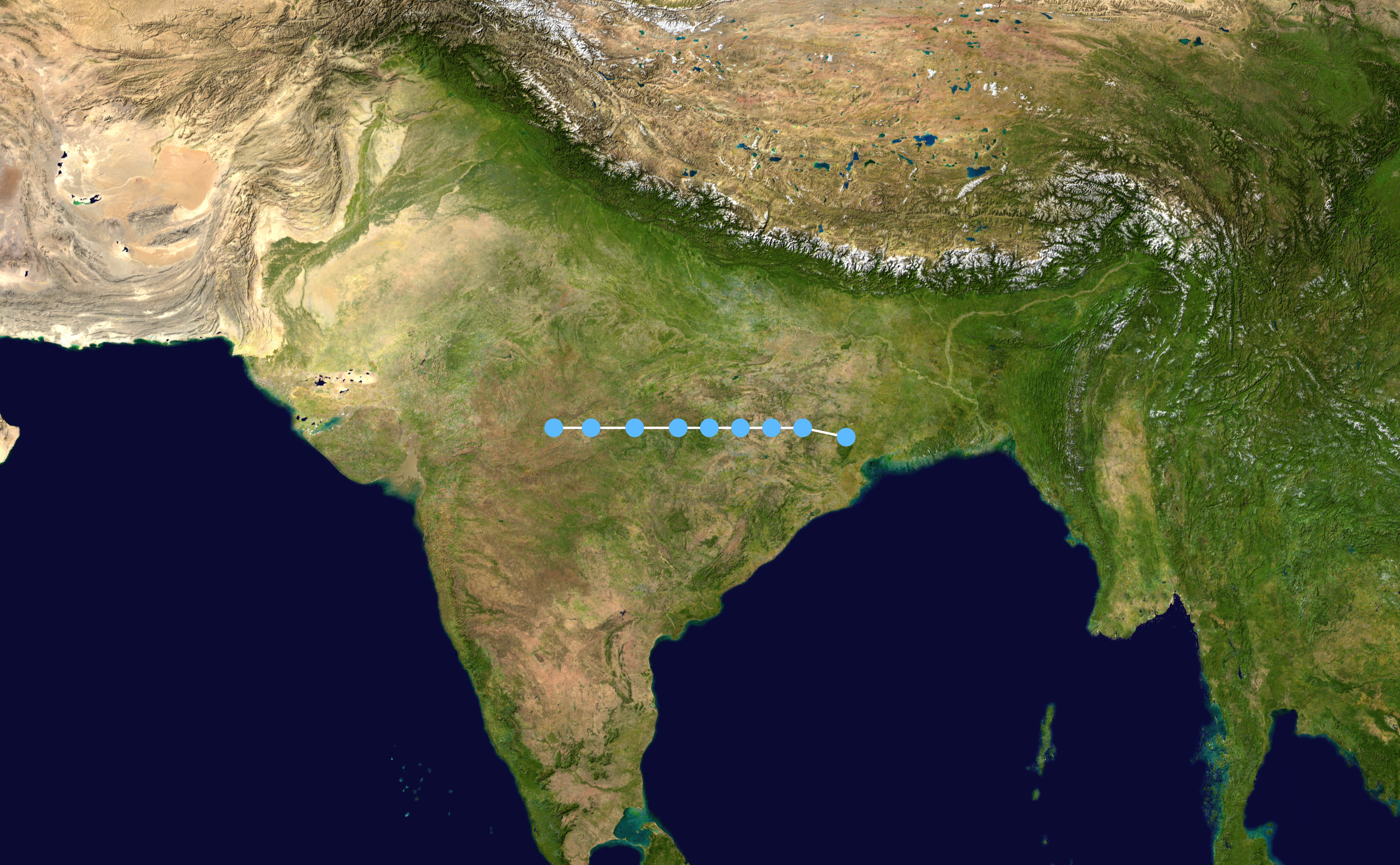
- Duration: July 21 – July 23
- Peak intensity: 45 km/h (30 mph) (3-min); 988 hPa (mbar)

On July 19, an upper level cyclonic circulation lay over the north-eastern Bay of Bengal and parts of Gangetic West Bengal and Odisha. Over the next day an area of low pressure formed, under the influence of this cyclonic circulation and rapidly concentrated into a Depression during July 21, over Odisha and West Bengal. Over the next couple of days the system moved westwards, before it weakened into an area of low pressure during July 23 over northwest Madhya Pradesh. The area of low pressure subsequently merged with the monsoon during July 25, while the cyclonic circulation persisted over Rajasthan and Punjab, before it was last noted during July 31. Under the influence of the depression, heavy to extremely heavy rainfall was recorded in the states of Odisha, Chhattisgarh, Madhya Pradesh and Vidarbha. In Odisha a total of 12 people lost their lives, while around 29,479 hectares (72,840 acres) of crops were affected and 1351 houses were damaged.

=== Deep Depression LAND 02 ===
- Deep depression (IMD)
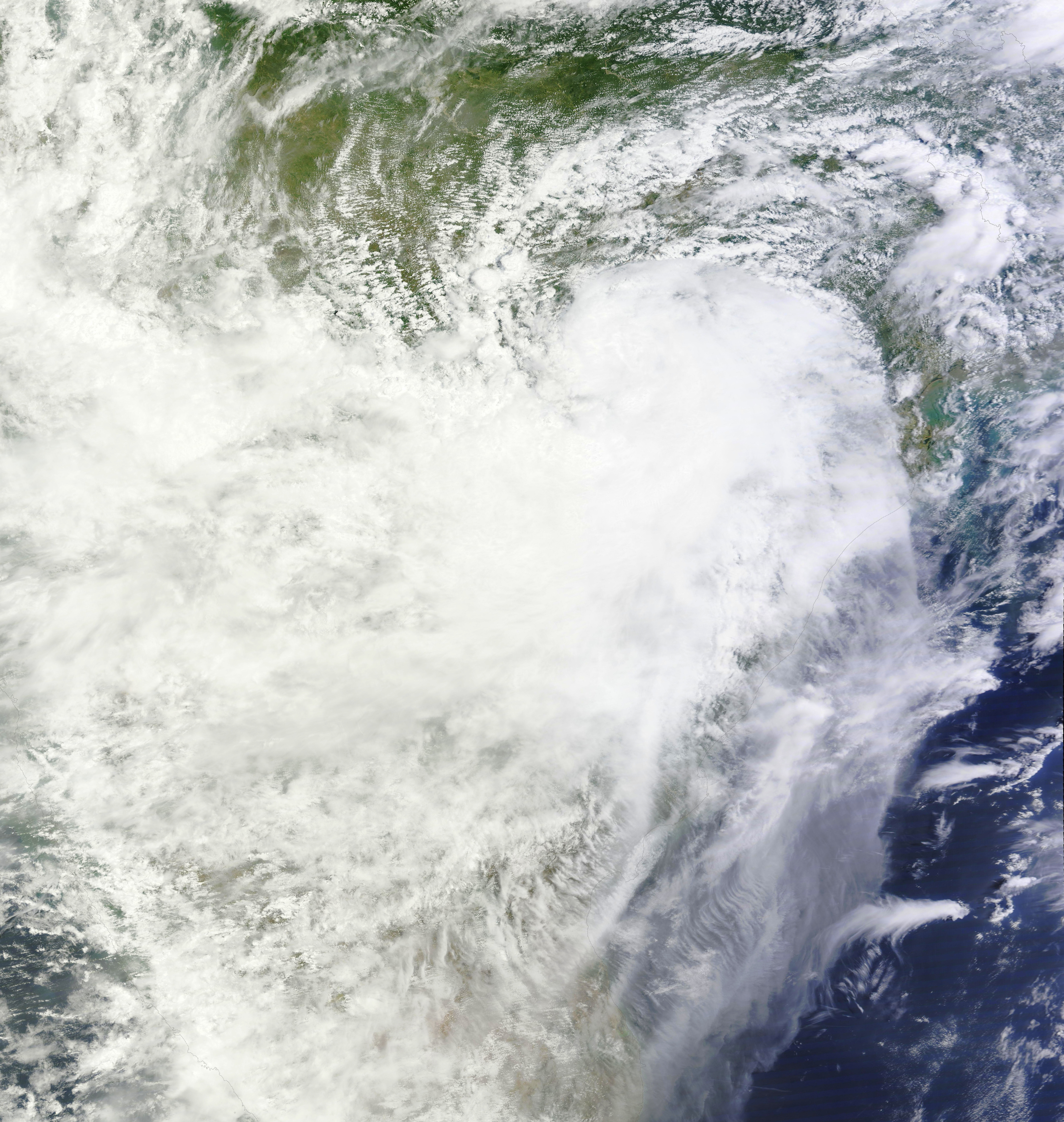
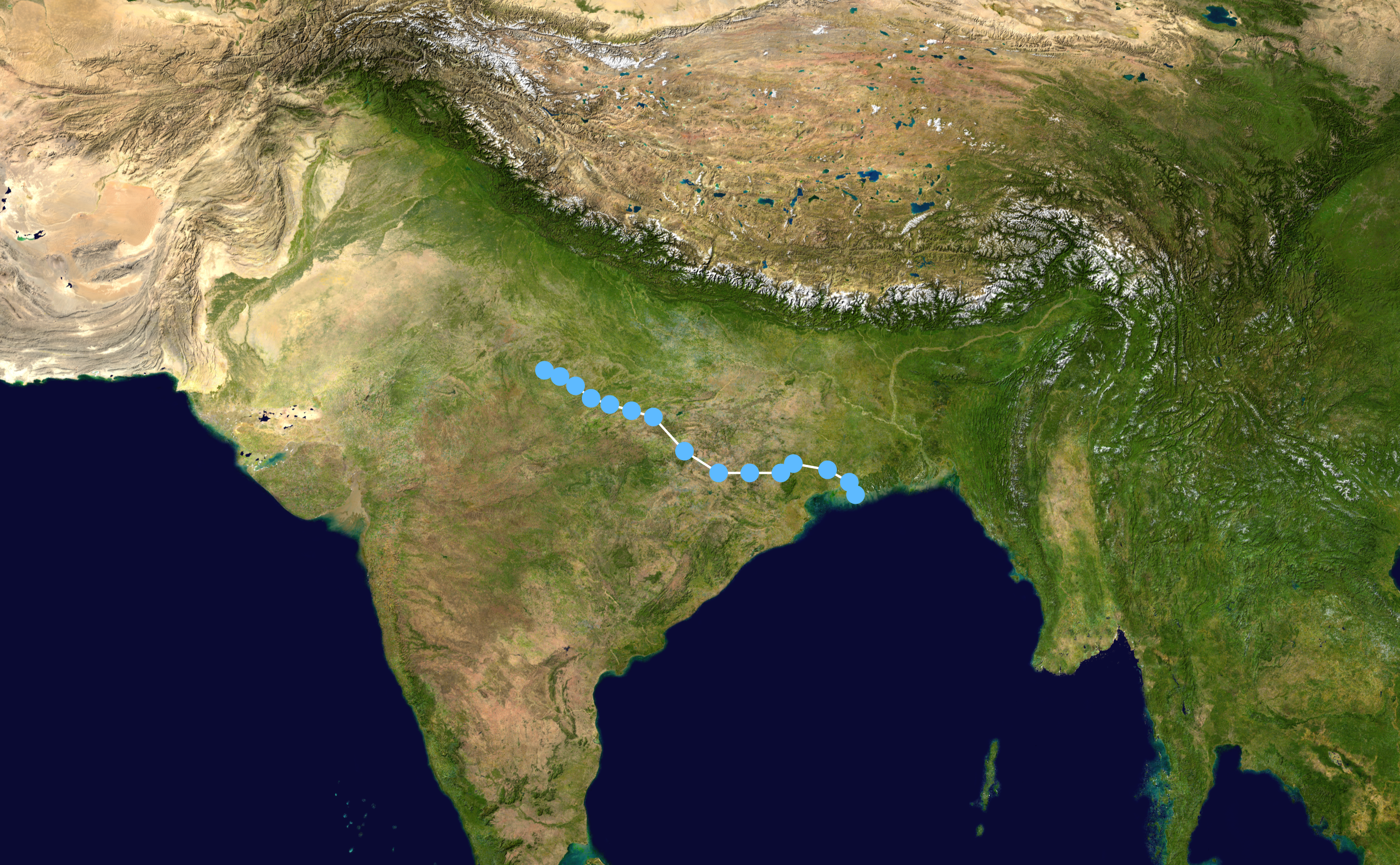
- Duration: August 4 – August 7
- Peak intensity: 55 km/h (35 mph) (3-min);

On 3 August, a low-pressure area formed over the Bay of Bengal under the influence of an upper air cyclonic circulation. The system slowly intensified into a depression the following day while being located inland over Midnapore. The depression moved further inland, underwent intensification and was upgraded to a deep depression the same day. The storm moved further westwards and weakened into a depression on August 5, and was last noted as a well marked low-pressure area on August 7 over northwestern Madhya Pradesh.

The storm activated a flood situation in Odisha, affecting 12 districts of the state. Waterlogging was reported in the cities of Cuttack and Bhubaneshwar, and nearly 200 villages were affected after the Baitarani river swelled more than two meters over its flood danger level. Sambalpur district received the highest amount of rainfall at 336.8 millimetres (13.26 in), followed by Balasore district receiving 226.4 millimetres (8.91 in). Seven people were reported to be missing after two trawlers capsized off the coast. The state government evacuated about 17,000 people from low-lying areas. 23 deaths were reported due to torrential rainfall.

=== Extremely Severe Cyclonic Storm Hudhud ===
- Extremely severe cyclonic storm (IMD)
- Category 4 tropical cyclone (SSHWS)
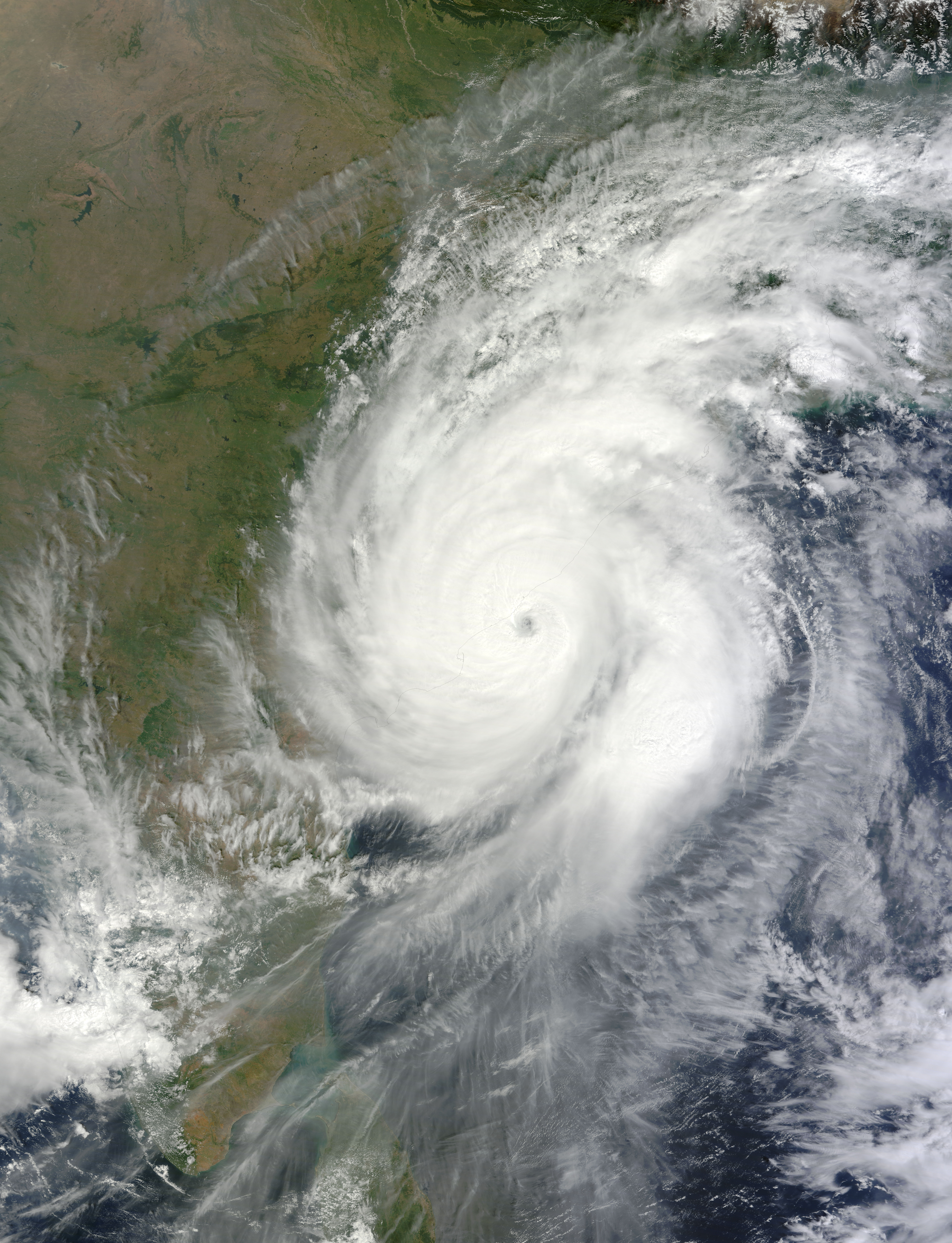
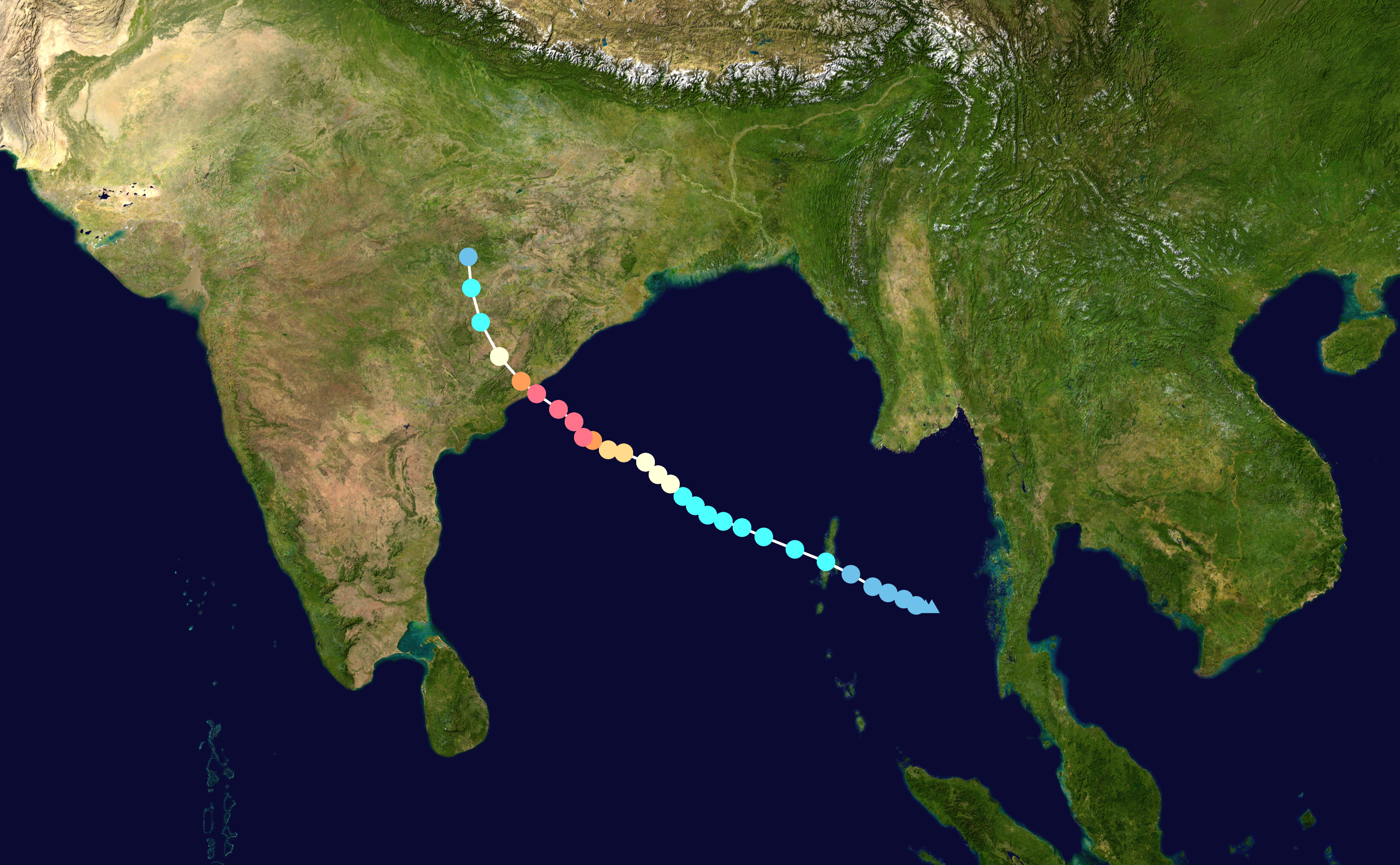
- Duration: October 7 – October 14
- Peak intensity: 185 km/h (115 mph) (3-min); 950 hPa (mbar)

Under the influence of an upper air cyclonic circulation, a low-pressure area formed over the Andaman Sea on October 6. The system drifted westward and intensified into a depression and subsequently into a deep depression the next day, followed by the Joint Typhoon Warning Center (JTWC) issuing a Tropical Cyclone Formation Alert (TCFA). Owing to favorable environmental conditions, the storm intensified into a cyclonic storm on October 8 and was named Hudhud. (Note: The name Hudhud (Arabic: هدهد, [hud.hud]) was contributed by Oman and refers to the Eurasian hoopoe (Upupa epops) in Arabic.) Its convection consolidated in the following hours, and Hudhud became a Severe Cyclonic Storm on October 9. Hudhud underwent rapid intensification in the following days, intensified into a Very severe cyclonic storm and developed a well-defined eye feature. Shortly before landfall near Visakhapatnam, Andhra Pradesh on October 12, Hudhud reached its peak strength with three-minute wind speeds of 175 km/h (109 mph) and a minimum central pressure of 950 hPa (28.05 inHg). The system drifted northwards over land and was last noted as a well-marked low-pressure area over east Uttar Pradesh on October 14.

Hudhud brought extensive damage to the coastal districts of Andhra Pradesh. Damage amounted to ₹21,908 crore (US$3.58 billion).

=== Extremely Severe Cyclonic Storm Nilofar ===
- Extremely severe cyclonic storm (IMD)
- Category 4 tropical cyclone (SSHWS)
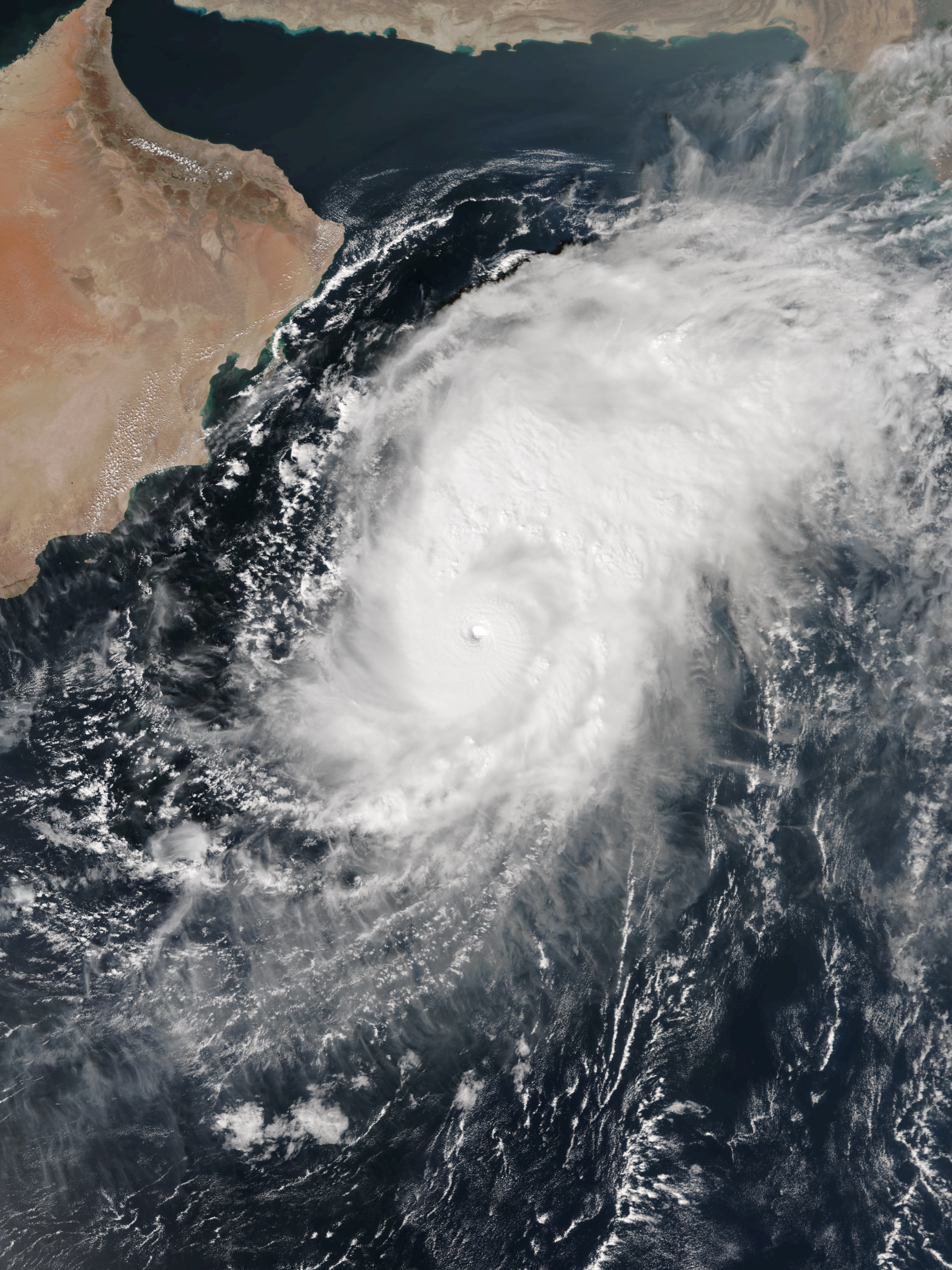
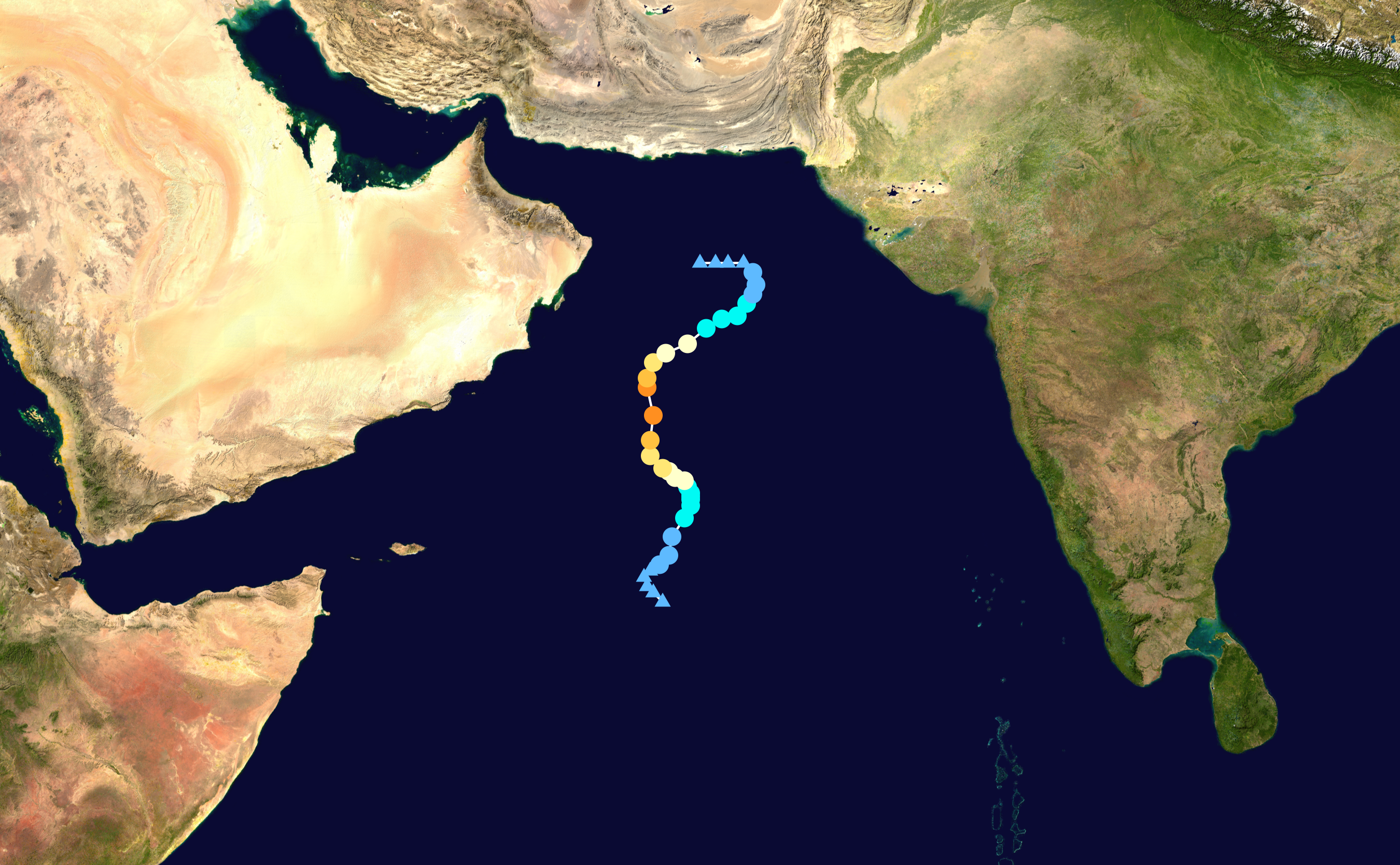
- Duration: October 25 – October 31
- Peak intensity: 205 km/h (125 mph) (3-min); 950 hPa (mbar)

In late October, a low-pressure area formed over the Arabian Sea. It slowly consolidated and a Tropical Cyclone Formation Alert (TCFA) was issued by the Joint Typhoon Warning Center (JTWC) on October 24. The following day, the India Meteorological Department (IMD) classified the storm as a depression, designating it ARB 02, and the JTWC estimated tropical storm winds at the storm's center, starting advisories for the system. On October 26, the system remained stationary and intensified into a Deep Depression. Subsequently, the IMD reported the storm had intensified into a cyclonic storm, and named it Nilofar. (Note: The name Nilofar (Urdu: نیلوفر, [niːloːˈfəɾ]) was contributed by Pakistan and means "water lily" in Urdu.) The following day, the IMD upgraded the storm into a severe cyclonic storm and further to a very severe cyclonic storm, and the JTWC reported hurricane-strength winds at Nilofar's center as it meanwhile developed an eye feature. On October 28, Nilofar underwent rapid intensification throughout the day, reaching a peak strength of 950 mbar (28.05 inHg) with wind speeds exceeding 205 km/h (127 mph), tied with Hudhud. Over the following days, the storm recurved northeastwards and experienced high vertical wind shear, causing it to weaken rapidly into a minimal cyclonic storm on October 30. The low-level circulation center of the storm became exposed in the following hours and IMD downgraded the storm into a well-marked low-pressure area on October 31, issuing its final advisory for the system.

=== Deep Depression BOB 04 ===
- Deep depression (IMD)
- Tropical storm (SSHWS)
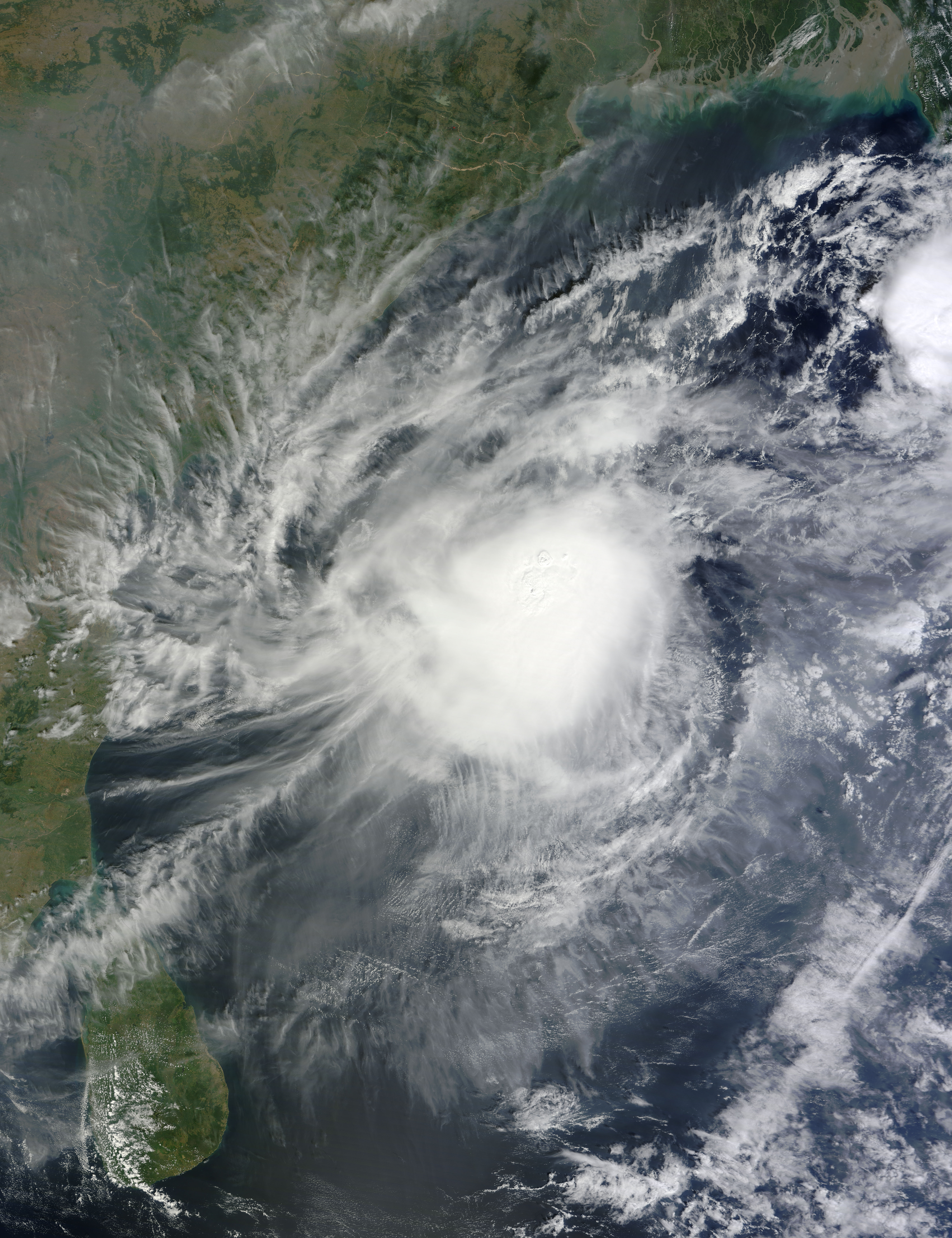
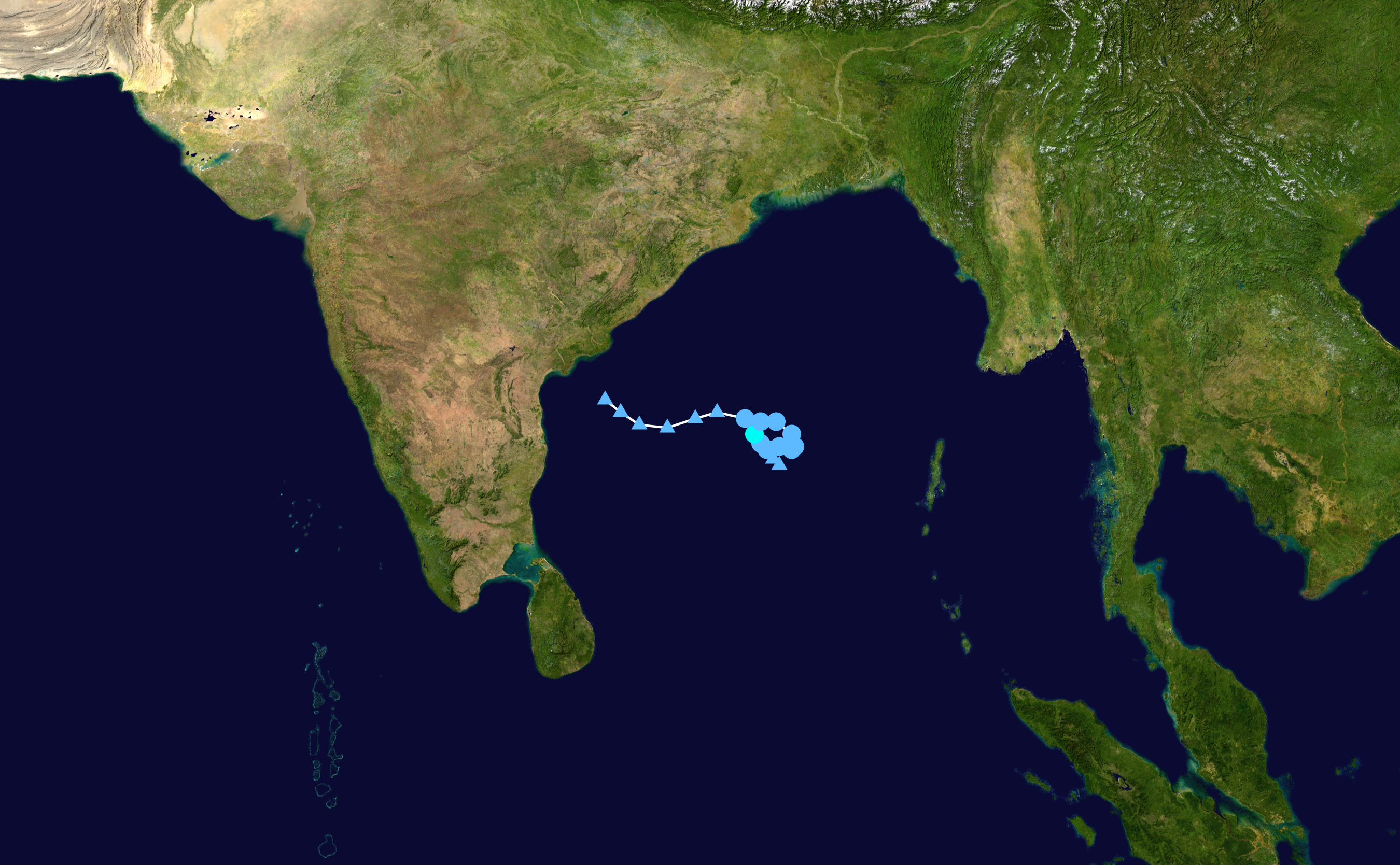
- Duration: November 5 – November 8
- Peak intensity: 55 km/h (35 mph) (3-min); 1000 hPa (mbar)

During November 3, an area of low pressure developed over the Bay of Bengal, under the influence of active northeast monsoon conditions. On November 5, the IMD identified the system as a depression and designated it with the identifier 'BOB 04'. This was followed by the JTWC issuing a TCFA and subsequently initiating advisories on the system. The JTWC designated it '05B' and was reporting 35 knots (65 km/h; 40 mph) winds around the center on November 6. Later that day, the IMD upgraded BOB 04 into a Deep Depression. The system drifted northwards over the next couple of days, maintaining its intensity. Located between two subtropical ridges, BOB 04 mostly showed quasi-stationary motion. However, albeit the adequately favorable conditions for further intensification, BOB 04 failed to intensify further. This resulted in the IMD downgrading the system into a Depression and further into an area of low pressure by November 8.

== Season effects ==
This is a table of all storms in the 2014 North Indian Ocean cyclone season. It mentions all of the season's storms and their names, durations, peak intensities (according to the IMD storm scale), landfall(s) – denoted by bold location names – damages, and death totals. Damage and death totals include the damage and deaths caused when that storm was a precursor wave or extratropical low, and all of the damage figures are in 2014 USD.

Name	Dates	Peak intensity			Areas affected	Damage (USD)	Deaths	Ref(s).
Name	Dates	Category	Wind speed	Pressure	Areas affected	Damage (USD)	Deaths	Ref(s).
BOB 01	January 4–7	Depression	45 kilometres per hour (28 mph)	1,004 hPa (29.65 inHg)	Sri Lanka	Minor	None	
BOB 02	May 21–23	Depression	45 kilometres per hour (28 mph)	1,000 hPa (29.53 inHg)	Andaman and Nicobar Islands, India	Minor	None	
Nanauk	June 10–14	Cyclonic storm	85 kilometres per hour (53 mph)	986 hPa (29.12 inHg)	Pakistan, Oman	None	None	
LAND 01	July 21–22	Depression	45 kilometres per hour (28 mph)	Not specified	India	Minor	12	
LAND 02	August 4–7	Deep depression	55 kilometres per hour (34 mph)	Not specified	India, Bangladesh	Minor	47	
Hudhud	October 7–14	Extremely severe cyclonic storm	185 kilometres per hour (115 mph)	950 hPa (28.05 inHg)	Andaman and Nicobar Islands, India, Visakhapatnam, Nepal	$11 billion	116	
Nilofar	October 25–31	Extremely severe cyclonic storm	205 kilometres per hour (127 mph)	950 hPa (28.05 inHg)	India, Pakistan	Minor	4	
BOB 04	November 5–8	Deep depression	55 kilometres per hour (34 mph)	1,000 hPa (29.53 inHg)	None	None	None	
Season aggregates
8 systems	January 4 – November 8		205 kilometres per hour (127 mph)	950 hPa (28.05 inHg)		$11 billion	179	

== See also ==
- Tropical cyclones in 2014
- 2014 Atlantic hurricane season
- 2014 Pacific hurricane season
- 2014 Pacific typhoon season
- South-West Indian Ocean cyclone seasons: 2013–14, 2014–15
- Australian region cyclone seasons: 2013–14, 2014–15
- South Pacific cyclone seasons: 2013–14, 2014–15
