= Dar Derafsh-e Mohammad-e Amin Mirza =

Dar Derafsh-e Mohammad-e Amin Mirza داردرفش محمدامين ميرزا
- Village
- Location within Iran
- Coordinates: 34°31′01″N 46°45′10″E
- Country: Iran
- Province: Kermanshah
- County: Kermanshah
- Bakhsh: Central
- Rural District: Baladarband

Population (2006)
  - Total: 231
- Time zone: UTC+3:30 (IRST)
  - Summer (DST): UTC+4:30 (IRDT)

Dar Derafsh-e Mohammad-e Amin Mirza (Persian: داردرفش محمدامين ميرزا, also Romanized as Dār Derafsh-e Moḩammad-e Amīn Mīrzā; also known as Dār Derafsh-e Moḩammad-e Amīn) is a village in Baladarband Rural District, in the Central District of Kermanshah County, Kermanshah Province, Iran. At the 2006 census, its population was 231, in 52 families.
