= Dar Derafsh-e Qaleh =

Dar Derafsh-e Qaleh داردرفش قلعه
- Village
- Location within Iran
- Coordinates: 34°30′28″N 46°46′24″E
- Country: Iran
- Province: Kermanshah
- County: Kermanshah
- Bakhsh: Central
- Rural District: Baladarband

Population (2006)
  - Total: 220
- Time zone: UTC+3:30 (IRST)
  - Summer (DST): UTC+4:30 (IRDT)

Dar Derafsh-e Qaleh (Persian: داردرفش قلعه, also Romanized as Dār Derafsh-e Qal‘eh) is a village in Baladarband Rural District, in the Central District of Kermanshah County, Kermanshah province, Iran. At the 2006 census, its population was 220, in 47 families.
