= Khersabad-e Bozorg =

Village in Kermanshah, Iran

Khersabad-e Bozorg خرس ابادبزرگ
- Village
- Location within Iran
- Coordinates: 34°29′11″N 46°44′24″E
- Country: Iran
- Province: Kermanshah
- County: Kermanshah
- Bakhsh: Central
- Rural District: Baladarband

Population (2006)
  - Total: 131
- Time zone: UTC+3:30 (IRST)
  - Summer (DST): UTC+4:30 (IRDT)

Khersabad-e Bozorg (Persian: خرس ابادبزرگ, also Romanized as Khersābād-e Bozorg; also known as Khersābād) is a village in Baladarband Rural District, in the Central District of Kermanshah County, Kermanshah Province, Iran. At the 2006 census, its population was 131, in 25 families.
