= Qez Qabri-ye Ebrahim =

Qez Qabri-ye Ebrahim قزقبري ابراهيم
- Village
- Location within Iran
- Coordinates: 34°27′25″N 46°44′11″E
- Country: Iran
- Province: Kermanshah
- County: Kermanshah
- Bakhsh: Central
- Rural District: Baladarband

Population (2006)
  - Total: 130
- Time zone: UTC+3:30 (IRST)
  - Summer (DST): UTC+4:30 (IRDT)

Qez Qabri-ye Ebrahim (Persian: قزقبري ابراهيم, also Romanized as Qez Qabrī-ye Ebrāhīm and Qez Qebrī-ye Ebrāhīm; also known as Qez Qebrī-ye Yek) is a village in Baladarband Rural District, in the Central District of Kermanshah County, Kermanshah Province, Iran. At the 2006 census, its population was 130, in 27 families.
