= Nilüfer Örer =

Turkish pop singer (born 1976)

Nilüfer Örer (born July 13, 1976 in Schweinfurt, Germany) is a Turkish pop singer.

She started her first album, called Şımarık, which was recorded in 1994. This album was released in 1996, but only to the Turkish music market. It spent several weeks at number 1 in the Top Ten of the Turkish music television channels Kral TV and Genç TV.

It was produced by her father, Arif Örer, who had successfully led a film distributor in Turkey for decades. The album was released by the well-known music label Şahin Özer Plak to the market.

== Discography ==
- "Şımarık" (1996)
- "Gördüm Sevdim" ft. Nani-S (2012)
