= Nilay =

Nilay is a female given name of Turkish origin. Ay means moon and Nil means the river Nile in Turkish language. The name means Moon of the Nile.In Sanskrit and languages derived from Sanskrit, it may mean "abode" or "home". People named Nilay include:

- Nilay Aydogan (1992–2023), Turkish basketball player
- Nilay Erkal (born 1999), Turkish long-distance swimmer
- Nilay Esen Ersun (born 1987), Turkish marathon runner
- Nilay Konar (born 1980), Turkish volleyball player
- Nilay Özdemir (born 1985), Turkish volleyball player
- Nilay Patel, American technology journalist
- Nilay Yiğit (born 1979), Turkish basketball player
