= Cyclone Nilofar =

North Indian cyclone in 2014

Extremely Severe Cyclonic Storm Nilofar
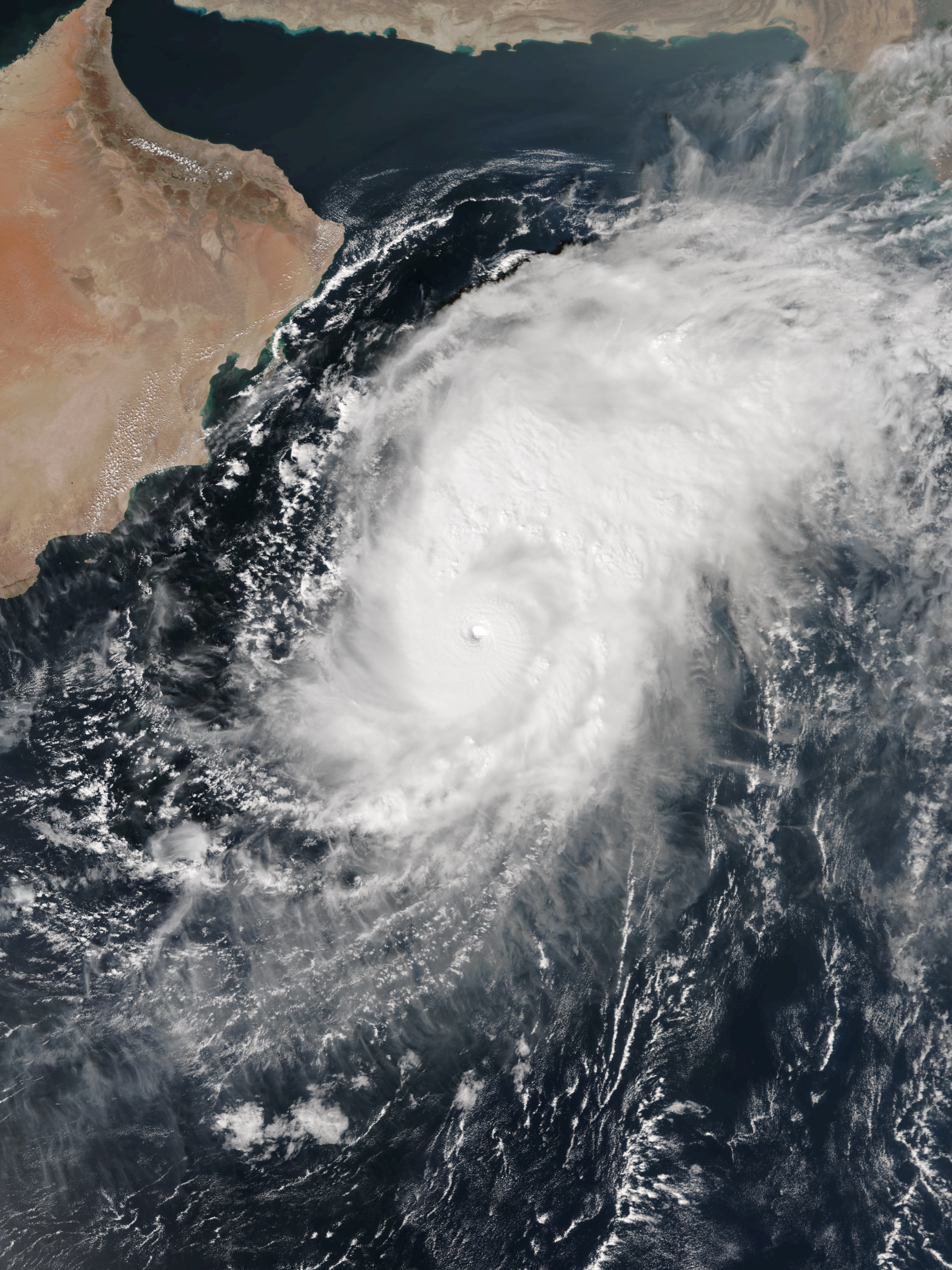
- Nilofar shortly before peak intensity on October 28

Meteorological history
- Formed: October 25, 2014
- Dissipated: October 31, 2014

Extremely severe cyclonic storm
- 3-minute sustained (IMD)
- Highest winds: 205 km/h (125 mph)
- Lowest pressure: 950 hPa (mbar); 28.05 inHg

Category 4-equivalent tropical cyclone
- 1-minute sustained (SSHWS)
- Highest winds: 215 km/h (130 mph)
- Lowest pressure: 937 hPa (mbar); 27.67 inHg

Overall effects
- Fatalities: 4 total
- Damage: Minimal
- Areas affected: Oman, India, Pakistan
- IBTrACS
- Part of the 2014 North Indian Ocean cyclone season

Extremely Severe Cyclonic Storm Nilofar (Note: The name Nilofar (Urdu: نیلوفر, [niːloːˈfəɾ]) was contributed by Pakistan and means "water lily" in Urdu.) was, at the time, the third-strongest cyclone in the Arabian Sea. In late October 2014, it reached peak maximum sustained winds estimated between 205 km/h (125 mph) and 215 km/h (130 mph). The western fringes of the storm caused flash flooding in northeastern Oman, killing four people.

Nilofar originated from a low-pressure area between India and the Arabian Peninsula. It developed into a depression on October 25 and moved generally northward through an area of favorable conditions. The system intensified into a cyclonic storm on October 26. Quickly organizing due to the conditions, Nilofar developed a well-defined eye and structure, attaining its peak intensity on October 28. At the time, Nilofar was expected to make landfall in western India, prompting evacuations and preparations. However, high wind shear caused the storm to rapidly weaken, and Nilofar degraded into a remnant low-pressure area on October 31 off the Indian state of Gujarat.

== Meteorological history ==
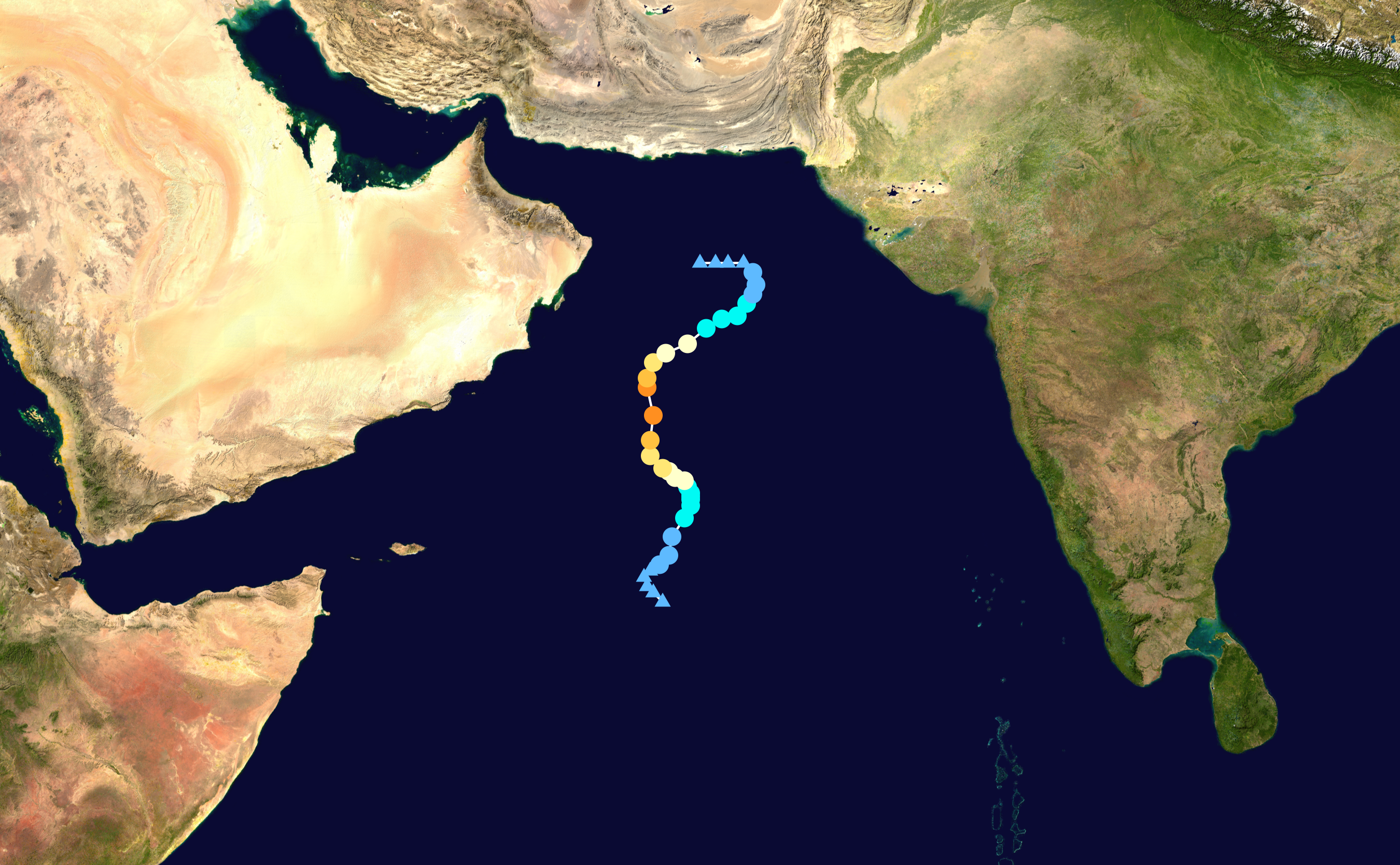
Map plotting the storm's track and intensity, according to the Saffir–Simpson scale Map key Saffir–Simpson scale Tropical depression (≤38 mph, ≤62 km/h) Tropical storm (39–73 mph, 63–118 km/h) Category 1 (74–95 mph, 119–153 km/h) Category 2 (96–110 mph, 154–177 km/h) Category 3 (111–129 mph, 178–208 km/h) Category 4 (130–156 mph, 209–251 km/h) Category 5 (≥157 mph, ≥252 km/h) Unknown Storm type Tropical cyclone Subtropical cyclone Extratropical cyclone, remnant low, tropical disturbance, or monsoon depression

Toward the middle of October 2014, the monsoon trough was active over the Arabian Sea off the west coast of India. A circulation formed on October 19 near the Lakshadweep archipelago, remaining nearly stationary for several days. It developed a distinct low-pressure area on October 21, and produced an intense area of convection by the next day. Despite moderate wind shear, conditions favored further development, including warm water temperatures and good outflow, amplified by an anticyclone to its east-northeast. The structure became more organized by October 24, when broken rainbands were rotating around a poorly defined circulation. That day, the American-based Joint Typhoon Warning Center (JTWC) classified it as a tropical depression, although the agency did not issue warnings at the time. At 00:00 UTC on October 25, the India Meteorological Department (IMD) classified the system as a depression about 1270 km (790 mi) southeast of Muscat, Oman.

When the system first formed, it benefited from warm water temperatures of 28 to 30 °C (82 to 86 °F) and a favorable phase of the Madden–Julian oscillation. Moderate wind shear and continued interaction with the monsoon dislocated the bulk of the deepest convection to the western periphery. By 12:00 UTC on October 25, the system organized enough for the JTWC to classify it as Tropical Cyclone 04A, and there were hints of an eye feature within the thunderstorms. By the time of classification, the storm was moving to the northeast, steered by the subtropical ridge to the south, although the motion slowed on October 26 due to competing influence of another subtropical ridge to the northwest. That day, the system strengthened quickly; the IMD upgraded the depression to a deep depression at 03:00 UTC, to Cyclonic Storm Nilofar at 06:00 UTC, and further to a severe cyclonic storm at 21:00 UTC. At 00:00 UTC on October 27, the JTWC upgraded Nilofar to the equivalent of a minimal hurricane, based on the development of a 54 km (33 mi) eye. Throughout that day, the cyclone turned more to the northwest as a ridge built to the east, while the inner core of convection became more symmetrical and compact. Also by that time, tropical cyclone forecast models anticipated that Nilofar would eventually recurve to the northeast and make landfall in western India.

At 06:00 UTC on October 27, the IMD upgraded Nilofar to a very severe cyclonic storm. The storm was rapidly intensifying at the time, after the wind shear had decreased, and the eye contracted to a diameter of 19 km (12 mi). At 09:00 UTC on October 28, the IMD upgraded Nilofar further to an extremely severe cyclonic storm. (Note: The India Meteorological Department implemented the category of Extremely Severe Cyclonic Storm in 2015 for storms with winds of 167 to 221 km/h (104 to 137 mph); such intensity was previously considered a Very Severe Cyclonic Storm.) Six hours later, the JTWC estimated peak 1-minute winds of 215 km/h (130 mph); at the time, the agency anticipated further strengthening due to the favorable conditions and good organization. At 18:00 UTC on October 28, the IMD estimated peak 3-minute winds of 205 km/h (125 mph). At the time, it was the third-strongest storm on record in the Arabian Sea. On October 29, Nilofar started weakening due to increased wind shear, and the convection diminished in intensity. At the same time, the storm turned northeastward while rounding the ridge to the east. Increasingly cooler and drier air, as well as cooler waters, caused the storm to degrade rapidly. The eye, previously small and well defined, dissipated by 06:00 UTC on October 29. Later that day, the center began decoupling from the convection, a sign of rapid weakening, and by 21:00 UTC the IMD downgraded it to a severe cyclonic storm. Early on October 30, the JTWC downgraded Nilofar to a tropical storm, and subsequently the circulation became exposed from the convection. At 18:00 UTC that day, the JTWC posted their final advisory. Nilofar weakened further into a depression on October 31, and soon after degenerated into a remnant low off coast of the Indian state of Gujarat.

== Preparations and impact ==
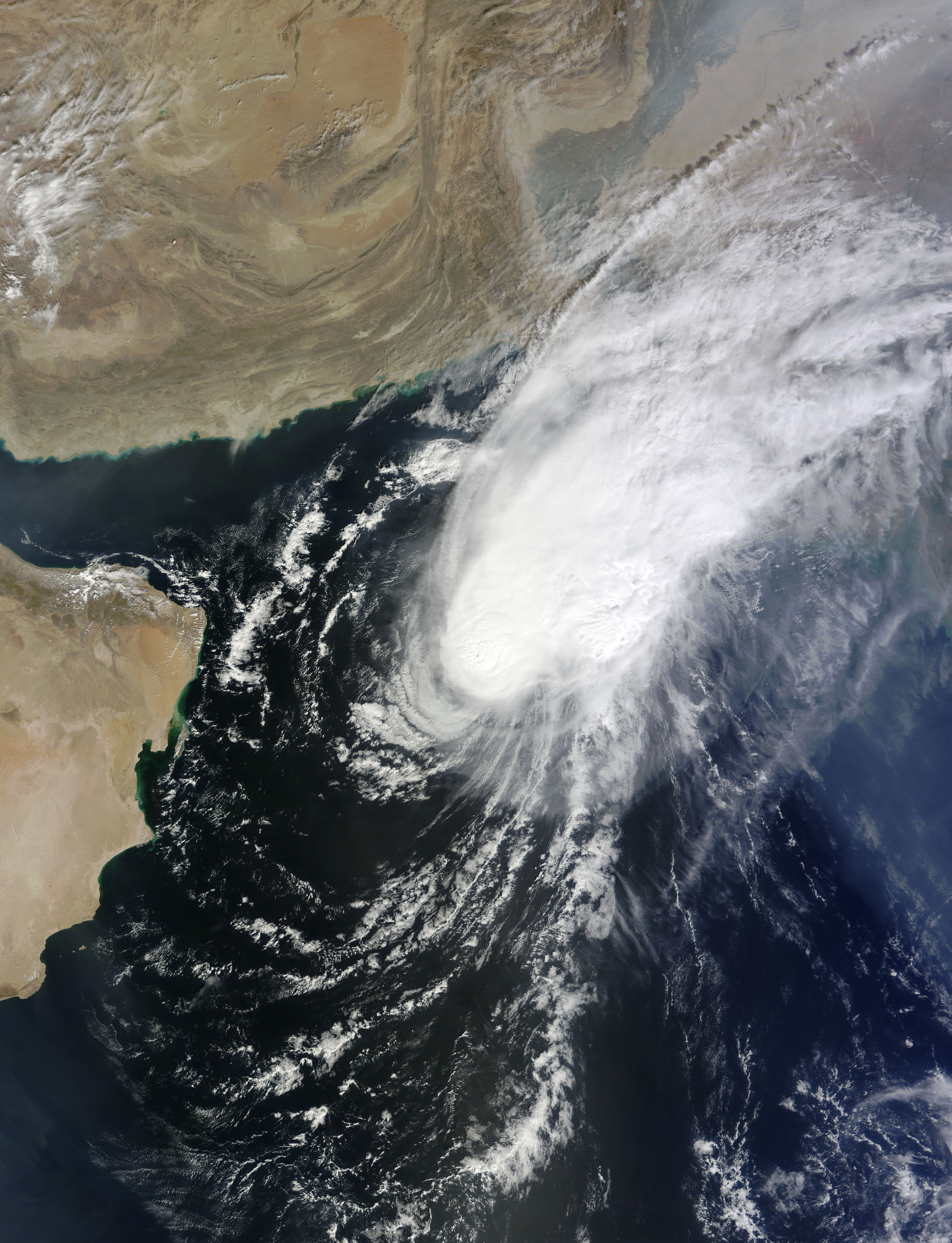
Cyclone Nilofar succumbing to strong wind shear on October 30. Note part of the low-level circulation exposed on the west side of the central dense overcast

Offshore buoys recorded 3.2 m (10.5 ft) waves and winds of 41 km/h (25 mph). The outskirts of the storm caused flash flooding in Al-Rustaq in northeastern Oman, killing four people after a vehicle was swept away in a flooded wadi. Five people were rescued when another car was stranded amid floods west of Al-Rustaq.

In the storm's developmental stages, the outskirts of Nilofar dropped 410 mm (16 in) of rainfall in Margao, Goa, helping the state record its wettest October in four years. Other nearby areas along India's west coast received heavy rainfall. The threat of the storm prompted officials to evacuate nearly 30,000 people in western India, utilizing 200 storm shelters. Most of the displaced people were living in thatched huts and weak structures. In coastal areas, schools were canceled for two days. Most of the evacuees quickly returned home after the storm weakened. To minimize damage, trees were trimmed down to eliminate damage due to falling debris, and a total suspension of fishing activities was ordered, with about 5,000 boats advised to return to port. Officials in Gujarat sent a warning of the storm to all operators of ham radios. A distant warning signal 2 was hoisted in the ports of Kandla and Mundra. National Disaster Response Force deployed rescue and rehabilitation teams at Gandhidham, Dwarka, Porbandar, Veraval, Rajkot and Bhuj while standby teams were stationed at Ahmedabad and Vadodara. After facing problems during deadly floods in September and Cyclone Hudhud in October, mobile companies enacted greater preparations during Nilofar to guarantee operations during the storm, including an emergency hotline, setting up internet in shelters, and mobile cell towers. Despite the threat from the storm, Nilofar only produced light rainfall and gusty winds along the Gujarat coast. Unseasonable rainfall damaged mangoes in Maharashtra, causing prices to rise. Shifting air patterns brought cooler temperatures to western India, signaling the end of the monsoon season, while also bringing haze and smog over Delhi from polluting areas to the south.

In Pakistan, fishermen were also warned to avoid the sea, and people in coastal areas were evacuated. The country's navy, coast guard, Pakistan Maritime Security Agency, and fishermen organizations helped rescue fishermen stationed offshore. Along the coast of Sindh province, bathing and swimming were banned for several days. There were minor power outages in Karachi due to heavy rainfall from Nilofar.

== See also ==
- List of Gujarat tropical cyclones
- Cyclone Gonu – strongest tropical cyclone on record in the Arabian Sea
- Cyclone Chapala – second-strongest tropical cyclone on record in the Arabian Sea
