= Niloufar Salehi =

American-Iranian computer scientist and professor

- Education: Stanford University; Sharif University of Technology
- Scientific career
- Workplaces: University of California, Berkeley
- Thesis: Design for collective action (2018)

Niloufar Salehi is an American-Iranian computer scientist who is an associate professor in the School of Information at the University of California, Berkeley. She works on human–computer interaction in a broad array of sectors.

== Early life and education ==
Salehi became interested in mathematics as a teenager. She was an undergraduate student in Iran and studied computer engineering at Sharif University of Technology. She completed her doctoral research at Stanford University. She studied and developed technologies to enable the organizing of communities online. During her doctorate she created Hive, a system that places communities into small teams, then rotates team membership (using an optimization algorithm) to intermix viewpoints. Hive was used by Mozilla when they were working on improving accessibility to Firefox. As a doctoral researcher, Salehi worked on Dynamo, an organizing platform for Amazon Mechanical Turk workers.

== Research and career ==
Salehi was appointed a professor at the University of California, Berkeley in 2018. She studies human–computer interaction and human centred AI. In 2020, Salehi was awarded a National Science Foundation grant to investigate restorative justice, and evaluate how it can be used to investigate conflicts on social media. She has studied YouTube's recommendation algorithms and how social media content creators navigate their online experiences.

Salehi was supported by Facebook Research to investigate how Muslims tackle anti-Muslim hate speech online. Her research revealed that there was organized targeting of Muslims, and that Muslim Americans were constantly trying to re-claim their narrative. For instance, in response to one of Trump's presidential debates, Muslim Americans shared their experiences of Islamophobia sometimes using humor. She simultaneously started working on an investigation into the impact of school assignment algorithms in the San Francisco Unified School District. The findings were used to encourage community engagement in the design of school zones.

In 2022, Salehi started working with Timnit Gebru on an effective automatic translation tool for high-stake settings, for example, in hospitals.

== Selected publications ==
- Salehi, Niloufar; Irani, Lilly C.; Bernstein, Michael S.; Alkhatib, Ali; Ogbe, Eva; Milland, Kristy; Clickhappier (2015-04-18). "We Are Dynamo: Overcoming Stalling and Friction in Collective Action for Crowd Workers". Proceedings of the 33rd Annual ACM Conference on Human Factors in Computing Systems. New York, NY, USA: ACM. pp. 1621–1630. doi:10.1145/2702123.2702508. ISBN 9781450331456. S2CID 16272139.
- Zhao, Xuan; Salehi, Niloufar; Naranjit, Sasha; Alwaalan, Sara; Voida, Stephen; Cosley, Dan (2013-04-27). "The many faces of facebook". Proceedings of the SIGCHI Conference on Human Factors in Computing Systems. New York, NY, USA: ACM. pp. 1–10. doi:10.1145/2470654.2470656. ISBN 9781450318990. S2CID 30876276.
- Suzuki, Ryo; Salehi, Niloufar; Lam, Michelle S.; Marroquin, Juan C.; Bernstein, Michael S. (2016-05-07). "Atelier: Repurposing Expert Crowdsourcing Tasks as Micro-internships". Proceedings of the 2016 CHI Conference on Human Factors in Computing Systems. New York, NY, USA: ACM. pp. 2645–2656. doi:10.1145/2858036.2858121. ISBN 9781450333627. S2CID 991732.
