= Sarab-e Nilufar =

Village in Kermanshah province, Iran

Sarab-e Nilufar Persian: سراب نيلوفر
- Village
- Location within Iran
- Coordinates: 34°24′17″N 46°51′27″E
- Country: Iran
- Province: Kermanshah
- County: Kermanshah
- District: Central
- Rural District: Bala Darband

Population (2016)
  - Total: 378
- Time zone: UTC+3:30 (IRST)

Sarab-e Nilufar (Persian: سراب نيلوفر) (Note: Also romanized as Sarāb Nīlūfar and Sarāb-e Nīlūfar) is a village in, and the capital of, Bala Darband Rural District of the Central District of Kermanshah County, Kermanshah province, Iran.

== Demographics ==
=== Population ===
At the time of the 2006 National Census, the village's population was 396 in 90 households. The following census in 2011 counted 344 people in 94 households. The 2016 census measured the population of the village as 378 people in 112 households.
