= Nilüfer Dam =

- Location: Turkey
- Coordinates: 40.0116°N 29.1163°E

Nilüfer Dam is a dam in Turkey. The development was backed by the Turkish State Hydraulic Works.

== See also ==
- List of dams and reservoirs in Turkey
