= Choqa Zard, Mahidasht =

Village in Kermanshah, Iran

Choqa Zard چقازرد
- Village
- Location within Iran
- Coordinates: 34°17′31″N 46°48′04″E
- Country: Iran
- Province: Kermanshah
- County: Kermanshah
- Bakhsh: Mahidasht
- Rural District: Mahidasht

Population (2006)
  - Total: 296
- Time zone: UTC+3:30 (IRST)
  - Summer (DST): UTC+4:30 (IRDT)

Choqa Zard (Persian: چقازرد, also Romanized as Choqā Zard) is a small village in Mahidasht Rural District, Mahidasht District, Kermanshah County, Kermanshah Province, Iran. As of the 2006 census, its population was 296 in a total of 68 different families.
