= Bala Darband Rural District =

Rural district in Kermanshah province, Iran

Bala Darband Rural District Persian: دهستان بالا دربند
- Rural District
- Location within Iran
- Coordinates: 34°25′14″N 46°53′27″E
- Country: Iran
- Province: Kermanshah
- County: Kermanshah
- District: Central
- Capital: Sarab-e Nilufar

Population (2016)
  - Total: 10,937
- Time zone: UTC+3:30 (IRST)

Bala Darband Rural District (Persian: دهستان بالا دربند) is in the Central District of Kermanshah County, Kermanshah province, Iran. Its capital is the village of Sarab-e Nilufar.

== Demographics ==
=== Population ===
At the time of the 2006 National Census, the rural district's population was 17,483 in 3,870 households. There were 18,373 inhabitants in 4,409 households at the following census of 2011. The 2016 census measured the population of the rural district as 10,937 in 2,521 households. The most populous of its 62 villages was Shahid Rajai Garrison, with 2,229 people.
