= Aliabad =

Aliabad (sometimes spelled Ali Abad) may refer to:

== Afghanistan ==
- 'Aliabad, a town in Aliabad District, Kunduz Province

== Azerbaijan ==
- Əliabad, Bilasuvar
- Əliabad, Jalilabad
- Əliabad, Lerik
- Əliabad, Nakhchivan
- Əliabad, Saatly
- Əliabad, Zaqatala

== India ==
- Aliabad, Hyderabad, suburb of Hyderabad
- Aliabad, Ranga Reddy district, a village in Telangana

== Iran ==
=== Alborz province ===
- Aliabad-e Guneh, a village in Karaj County

=== Ardabil province ===
- Aliabad, former name of Kharabeh-ye Kohal, a village in Ardabil County
- Aliabad, Khanandabil-e Sharqi, a village in Khalkhal County
- Aliabad, Shal, a village in Khalkhal County
- Aliabad, Kowsar, a village in Kowsar County
- Aliabad, Arshaq, alternate name of Heydarabad, Ardabil, a village in Meshgin Shahr County
- Aliabad, Qarah Su, a village in Meshgin Shahr County
- Aliabad, Nir, a village in Nir County

=== Bushehr province ===
- Aliabad, Dashti, a village in Dashti County
- Aliabad, Jam, a village in Jam County
- Aliabad-e Jainag, a village in Tangestan County

=== Chaharmahal and Bakhtiari province ===
- Aliabad, Borujen, a village in Borujen County
- Aliabad, Falard, a village in Falard County
- Aliabad-e Poshteh, a village in Khanmirza County

=== East Azerbaijan province ===
- Aliabad, Ahar, a village in Ahar County
- Aliabad, Bostanabad, a village in Bostanabad County
- Aliabad-e Olya, East Azerbaijan, a village in Hashtrud County
- Aliabad-e Sofla, East Azerbaijan, a village in Hashtrud County
- Aliabad Rural District (Hashtrud County), an administrative division
- Aliabad, Kaleybar, a village in Kaleybar County
- Aliabad, Khoda Afarin, alternate name of Sarijalu, East Azerbaijan, a village in Khoda Afarin County
- Aliabad, Malekan, alternate name of Idahluy-e Kuchek, a village in Malekan County
- Aliabad-e Qeshlaq, a village in Malekan County
- Aliabad, Maragheh, a village in Maragheh County
- Aliabad, Osku, a village in Osku County
- Aliabad, Varzaqan, a village in Varzaqan County

=== Fars province ===
==== Abadeh County ====
- Aliabad, Abadeh, a village

==== Arsanjan County ====
- Aliabad-e Malek, a village
- Aliabad-e Salar, a village
- Aliabad-e Malek Rural District, an administrative division

==== Beyza County ====
- Aliabad-e Qoroq, a village
- Aliabad-e Sar Tang, a village
- Aliabad-e Sar Tol, Fars, a village

==== Darab County ====
- Aliabad, Darab, alternate name of Aliabad-e Puzeh Rowghan Cheraghi, a village

==== Eqlid County ====
- Aliabad, Eqlid, a village

==== Estahban County ====
- Aliabad-e Shams, a village

==== Fasa County ====
- Aliabad, Jangal, a village
- Aliabad, Sheshdeh and Qarah Bulaq, a village
- Aliabad-e Sorkhak, a village

==== Jahrom County ====
- Aliabad-e Nasir Khani, a village

==== Kavar County ====
- Aliabad, Kavar, a village

==== Kazerun County ====
- Aliabad, Balyan, alternate name of Aliabad-e Dutu, a village
- Aliabad, Dasht-e Barm, a village
- Aliabad, Deris, a village
- Aliabad, Jereh and Baladeh, a village
- Aliabad-e Musehli, a village

==== Khafr County ====
- Aliabad, Khafr, a village
- Aliabad Rural District (Khafr County), an administrative division

==== Khorrambid County ====
- Aliabad-e Bejuyeh, a village

==== Lamerd County ====
- Aliabad, Lamerd, a village
- Aliabad-e Jowhari, a village

==== Larestan County ====
- Aliabad, Beyram, a village
- Aliabad, Larestan, a village
- Aliabad-e Kohneh, Fars, alternate name of Kohneh, Larestan, a village
- Aliabad-e Owkoshi, a village
- Aliabad-e Zahd Mahmud, a village

==== Marvdasht County ====
- Aliabad-e Olya, Fars, a village
- Aliabad-e Sofla, Marvdasht, a village

==== Neyriz County ====
- Aliabad, Horgan, a village
- Aliabad, Qatruyeh, a village
- Aliabad-e Qadim, a village
- Aliabad-e Shur, Fars, a village

==== Pasargad County ====
- Aliabad, Pasargad, a village

==== Qir and Karzin County ====
- Aliabad, Qir and Karzin, alternate name of Shahrak-e Aliabad, Fars, a village

==== Sarchehan County ====
- Aliabad, Sarchehan, a village

==== Sepidan County ====
- Aliabad, Hamaijan, alternate name of Aliabad-e Abgarm, a village
- Aliabad, Sepidan, a village

==== Shiraz County ====
- Aliabad, Kaftarak, a village
- Aliabad, Qarah Bagh, a village
- Aliabad-e Khvoshablu, a village
- Aliabad-e Qarchi, a village
- Aliabad-e Seh Tolan, a village

=== Gilan province ===
- Aliabad, alternate name of Garmay Sara, a village in Amlash County
- Aliabad, Amlash, a village in Amlash County
- Aliabad, Bandar-e Anzali, alternate name of Aliabad-e Kapur Chal, a village in Bandar-e Anzali County
- Aliabad Sara, a village in Langarud County
- Aliabad, Rasht, a village in Rasht County
- Aliabad-e Ziba Kenar Rural District, an administrative division of Rasht County
- Aliabad, Rudbar, a village in Rudbar County
- Aliabad, Chini Jan, a village in Rudsar County
- Aliabad, Kelachay, a village in Rudsar County
- Aliabad, Siahkal, alternate name of Ali Va, a village in Siahkal County

=== Golestan province ===
- Aliabad-e Katul, also known as Aliabad, a city in Aliabad-e Katul County
- Aliabad-e Katul County, an administfrative division
- Aliabad-e Sistaniha, a village in Gonbad-e Kavus County
- Aliabad-e Kenar Shahr, a village in Gorgan County
- Shir Aliabad, a village in Gorgan County

=== Hamadan province ===
- Aliabad-e Ayvora, a village in Asadabad County
- Aliabad-e Pir Shams ol Din, a village in Asadabad County
- Aliabad-e Aq Hesar, a village in Hamadan County
- Aliabad-e Posht Shahr, a neighborhood in the city of Hamadan
- Aliabad-e Varkaneh, a village in Hamadan County
- Aliabad, Kabudarahang, a village in Kabudarahang County
- Aliabad, Malayer, a village in Malayer County
- Aliabad-e Damaq, a city in Malayer County
- Aliabad, Nahavand, a village in Nahavand County
- Aliabad, Tuyserkan, a village in Tuyserkan County

=== Hormozgan province ===
- Aliabad, Bandar Abbas, a village in Bandar Abbas County
- Aliabad, Bashagard, a village in Bashagard County
- Aliabad-e Sarhadi, a village in Bashagard County
- Aliabad, Hajjiabad, a village in Hajjiabad County
- Shahrak-e Aliabad, Hormozgan, a village in Jask County
- Aliabad, Minab, a village in Minab County
- Aliabad, Jaghin, a village in Rudan County
- Aliabad, Rudkhaneh, a village in Rudan County

=== Ilam province ===
- Aliabad, Abdanan, a village in Abdanan County
- Aliabad, Darreh Shahr, a village in Darreh Shahr County
- Aliabad-e Bozorg, a village in Dehloran County
- Aliabad-e Kuchak, a village in Dehloran County
- Aliabad-e Olya, Ilam, a village in Sirvan County
- Aliabad-e Sofla, Ilam, a village in Sirvan County
- Aliabad-e Vosta, a village in Sirvan County

=== Isfahan province ===
==== Aran and Bidgol County ====
- Aliabad, Sefiddasht, alternate name of Aliabad-e Kavir, a village
- Aliabad, Kavirat, a village

==== Ardestan County ====
- Aliabad, Barzavand, a village
- Aliabad, Hombarat, alternate name of Aliabad-e Pain, Isfahan, a village
- Aliabad, Olya, a village
- Aliabad, Rigestan, a village
- Aliabad-e Qahsareh, alternate name of Qahsareh, a village

==== Borkhar County ====
- Aliabad Chi, a village
- Aliabad-e Molla Ali, a village

==== Chadegan County ====
- Aliabad, Chenarud, a village
- Aliabad, Kaveh Ahangar, a village

==== Dehaqan County ====
- Aliabad, Musaabad, alternate name of Aliabad-e Gachi, a village
- Aliabad, Qombovan, alternate name of Aliabad-e Jombozeh, a village

==== Falavarjan County ====
- Aliabad, Falavarjan, a village

==== Golpayegan County ====
- Aliabad, Golpayegan, a village

==== Isfahan County ====
- Aliabad, Qahab-e Jonubi, a village

==== Kashan County ====
- Aliabad, Kashan, a village

==== Kuhpayeh County ====
- Aliabad, Tudeshk, a village

==== Najafabad County ====
- Aliabad, Hoseynabad, a village
- Aliabad, Sadeqiyeh, a village
- Aliabad-e Kahriz Sang, former name of the city of Kahriz Sang

==== Semirom County ====
- Aliabad, Padena, a village
- Aliabad, Vardasht, a village
- Aliabad-e Deh Kord, a village

==== Tiran and Karvan County ====
- Aliabad, Tiran and Karvan, alternate name of Aliabad-e Karvan, a village

=== Kerman province ===
==== Anar County ====
- Aliabad, Anar, alternate name of Aliabad-e Hasan, a village

==== Anbarabad County ====
- Aliabad-e Qadiri, a village
- Aliabad Rural District (Anbarabad County), an administrative division

==== Arzuiyeh County ====
- Aliabad, Dehsard, a village
- Aliabad, Soghan, formerly Rustai-ye Aliabad, a village
- Aliabad-e Shamshir Bar, a village
- Aliabad-e Takht-e Khvajeh, a village

==== Baft County ====
- Aliabad, Baft, a village
- Aliabad-e Yek, Baft, a village

==== Bam County ====
- Aliabad, Bam, alternate name of Aliabad-e Do, Bam, a village
- Aliabad, Baravat, a village

==== Fahraj County ====
- Aliabad, Fahraj, a village
- Aliabad-e Chahdegan, a village
- Aliabad-e Vali Shahanvazi, a village

==== Gonbaki County ====
- Aliabad, Gonbaki, a neighborhood in the city of Gonbaki
- Aliabad-e Mohammad Qasem Khan, a village

==== Jazmurian County ====
- Aliabad, Jazmurian, alternate name of Lab Feravan, a village
- Aliabad, Jazmurian County, a village

==== Jiroft County ====
- Aliabad, Dowlatabad, former name of the city of Aliabad-e Omran
- Aliabad, Halil, a village
- Aliabad, Rezvan, a village
- Aliabad, Sarduiyeh, a village
- Aliabad-e Khazayi-ye Aliabad-e Marki, a village
- Aliabad-e Sadat, Jiroft, a village

==== Kerman County ====
- Aliabad, Baghin, alternate name of Aliabad-e Robat, a village
- Aliabad, Ekhtiarabad, a village
- Aliabad, Golbaf, a village
- Aliabad, Rayen, a village
- Aliabad, Shahdad, a village
- Aliabad, Takab Rural District, alternate name of Valiabad, Shahdad, a village
- Aliabad-e Hojjat, a village
- Aliabad-e Jahr, a village

==== Narmashir County ====
- Aliabad-e Tadayyon, a village
- Aliabad-e Ziaabad, a village
- Aliabad-e Zinbiyeh, a village

==== Rabor County ====
- Aliabad, Hanza, a village

==== Rafsanjan County ====
- Aliabad, Darreh Doran, alternate name of Aliabad-e Darreh Dur, a village
- Aliabad, Ferdows, a village
- Aliabad, Khenaman, a village
- Aliabad, Koshkuiyeh, alternate name of Aliabad-e Sadat, Rafsanjan, a village
- Aliabad, Nuq, a village
- Aliabad, Razmavaran, alternate name of Qavamabad, Rafsanjan, a village
- Aliabad, Sarcheshmeh, alternate name of Aliabad-e Yek, Rafsanjan, a village
- Aliabad-e Enqelab, Kerman, a village
- Aliabad-e Herati, a village
- Aliabad-e Moftabad, a village
- Aliabad-e Shahid, Kerman, a village

==== Ravar County ====
- Aliabad-e Kuh Namaki, a village
- Aliabad-e Yek, Ravar, a village

==== Rigan County ====
- Aliabad-e Posht-e Rig, a village

==== Rudbar-e Jonubi County ====
- Aliabad-e Olya, Kerman, a village
- Aliabad-e Sofla, Rudbar-e Jonubi, a village

==== Shahr-e Babak County ====
- Aliabad, Estabraq, a village
- Aliabad, Khursand, alternate name of Aliabad-e Kafi, a village
- Aliabad-e Rugushuiyeh, a village

==== Zarand County ====
- Aliabad, Yazdanabad, alternate name of Aliabad-e Sofla, Zarand, a village
- Aliabad, Zarand, a village

=== Kermanshah province ===
==== Dalahu County ====
- Aliabad, Dalahu, alternate name of Aliabad-e Kerend, a village

==== Eslamabad-e Gharb County ====
- Aliabad, Homeyl, alternate name of Aliabad-e Dizgoran, a village
- Aliabad, Howmeh-ye Jonubi, a village

==== Gilan-e Gharb County ====
- Aliabad, Gilan-e Gharb, a village in Gilan-e Gharb County

==== Harsin County ====
- Aliabad, Cham Chamal, a village
- Aliabad, Shirez, a village
- Aliabad-e Kashantu, a village

==== Javanrud County ====
- Aliabad-e Kohneh, a village
- Aliabad-e Sasal, a village

==== Kangavar County ====
- Aliabad, Kangavar, a village
- Aliabad-e Avval, a village
- Aliabad-e Dovvom, a village

==== Kermanshah County ====
- Aliabad, Kuzaran, alternate name of Aliabad-e Golbanu, a village
- Aliabad, Miyan Darband, a village
- Aliabad, Sar Firuzabad, a village
- Aliabad-e Olya, Kermanshah, a village
- Aliabad-e Sofla, Kermanshah, a village

==== Ravansar County ====
- Aliabad, Ravansar, a village

==== Sahneh County ====
- Aliabad, Sahneh, a village
- Aliabad-e Garus, a village

==== Sonqor County ====
- Aliabad, Sonqor, a village
- Aliabad-e Yusefi, a village

=== Khuzestan province ===
- Aliabad, Andika, a village in Andika County
- Aliabad, Andimeshk, a village in Andimeshk County
- Aliabad-e Hufel, a village in Dasht-e Azadegan County
- Aliabad, Howmeh-ye Sharqi, a village in Izeh County
- Aliabad, Margha, a village in Izeh County
- Aliabad-e Olya, Khuzestan, a village in Lali County
- Aliabad-e Sofla, Khuzestan, a village in Lali County
- Aliabad, Tolbozan, a village in Masjed Soleyman County
- Aliabad, Tombi Golgir, a village in Masjed Soleyman County
- Aliabad-e Kabedan, alternate name of Cheshmeh Ali-ye Kayedan, a village in Masjed Soleyman County
- Aliabad, Omidiyeh, a village in Omidiyeh County

=== Kohgiluyeh and Boyer-Ahmad province ===
- Aliabad-e Mokhtar, a village in Boyer-Ahmad County
- Aliabad-e Sartol, Kohgiluyeh and Boyer-Ahmad, a village in Boyer-Ahmad County
- Aliabad-e Kukhdan, a village in Dana County
- Masumabad va Aliabad-e Kareyak, a village in Dana County
- Aliabad-e Ab Kaseh, a village in Kohgiluyeh County

=== Kurdistan province ===
- Aliabad, Najafabad, Bijar, a village in Bijar County
- Aliabad, Siyah Mansur, a village in Bijar County
- Aliabad-e Luch, a village in Dehgolan County
- Aliabad-e Moshir, a village in Dehgolan County
- Aliabad, Divandarreh, a village in Divandarreh County
- Aliabad-e Duleh Rash, a village in Divandarreh County
- Aliabad-e Karaftu, a village in Divandarreh County
- Aliabad-e Maran, a village in Divandarreh County
- Aliabad, Qorveh, alternate name of Aliabad-e Yalghuz Aghaj, a village in Qorveh County
- Aliabad, Kalatrazan, a village in Sanandaj County
- Aliabad, Naran, a village in Sanandaj County
- Aliabad-e Bezindar, a village in Sanandaj County
- Aliabad, Saqqez, a village in Saqqez County

=== Lorestan province ===
==== Aligudarz County ====
- Aliabad, Mahru, a village
- Aliabad, Zaz-e Sharqi, a village
- Aliabad Darreh Moshk, a village

==== Azna County ====
- Aliabad, Azna, a village

==== Borujerd County ====
- Aliabad, Borujerd, a village

==== Delfan County ====
- Aliabad, Kakavand, a village
- Aliabad, Khaveh-ye Jonubi, a village
- Aliabad, Mirbag-e Jonubi, a village
- Aliabad Cheragh, a village
- Aliabad Jadid, a village
- Aliabad-e Cheragh, alternate name of Cheragh, a village
- Aliabad-e Gavkosh, a village
- Aliabad-e Pirdusti, a village
- Gashur-e Aliabad, a village
- Gorg Aliabad, a village
- Hoseyn Aliabad, Lorestan, a village
- Shahrak-e Aliabad, Lorestan, alternate name of Shahrak-e Emam Khomeyni, Delfan, a village

==== Dorud County ====
- Aliabad, Dorud, a village

==== Khorramabad County ====
- Aliabad, Khorramabad, a village
- Aliabad, Zagheh, a village
- Aliabad Parsaneh, a village
- Aliabad Piameni, a village
- Aliabad-e Beyg Reza, alternate name of Bag Reza, a village
- Aliabad-e Chahi, a village

==== Kuhdasht County ====
- Aliabad, Kunani, alternate name of Alinabad, a village
- Ganj Aliabad-e Olya, alternate name of Ganjali, Lorestan, a village
- Ganj Aliabad-e Sofla, alternate name of Ganjali-e Sofla, a village

==== Rumeshkan ====
- Aliabad Nazar Alivand, a village
- Choqapur Aliabad, a village

==== Selseleh County ====
- Aliabad, Doab, a village
- Aliabad, Qaleh-ye Mozaffari, a village
- Aliabad-e Bar Aftab, a village
- Aliabad-e Bar Anazar, a village
- Aliabad-e Cheshmeh Barqi, alternate name of Cheshmeh Barqi, a village
- Aliabad-e Javanmard, a village
- Aliabad-e Olya, Lorestan, a village
- Aliabad-e Sofla, Lorestan, a village
- Mohammad Aliabad, Lorestan, a village

=== Markazi province ===
- Aliabad, Moshkabad, a village in Arak County
- Aliabad, Shamsabad, a village in Arak County
- Aliabad, Farahan, a village in Farahan County
- Aliabad, Ashna Khvor, a village in Khomeyn County
- Aliabad, Galehzan, a village in Khomeyn County
- Aliabad, Kamareh, a village in Khomeyn County
- Aliabad, Khondab, a village in Khondab County
- Aliabad, Komijan, a village in Komijan County
- Aliabad-e Sanjeh Bashi, a village in Mahallat County
- Aliabad, Saveh, alternate name of Aliabad-e Band, a village in Saveh County
- Aliabad, Qarah Kahriz, a village in Shazand County
- Aliabad, Khoshkrud, a village in Zarandiyeh County

=== Mazandaran province ===
- Aliabad, Babol, a village in Babol County
- Aliabad, Babolsar, a village in Babolsar County
- Aliabad, Behshahr, a village in Behshahr County
- Aliabad-e Chalus, a village in Chalus County
- Aliabad, Juybar, a village in Juybar County
- Aliabad, Mahmudabad, a village in Mahmudabad County
- Aliabad-e Asgarkhan, a village in Nowshahr County
- Aliabad-e Mir, a village in Nowshahr County
- Aliabad, Nur, a village in Nur County
- Aliabad, former name of the city of Qaem Shahr
- Aliabad Rural District (Qaem Shahr County), an administrative division
- Aliabad, Sari, a village in Sari County
- Aliabad, Goli Jan, alternate name of Aliabad-e Faqih Mahalleh, a village in Tonekabon County
- Aliabad, Tonekabon, a village in Tonekabon County

=== North Khorasan province ===
- Aliabad, Bojnord, a village in Bojnord County
- Aliabad, Esfarayen, a village in Esfarayen County
- Aliabad-e Alu, a village in Esfarayen County
- Aliabad-e Qarah Chay, a village in Maneh County

=== Qazvin province ===
- Aliabad, Abgarm, a village in Avaj County
- Aliabad, Hesar-e Valiyeasr, a village in Avaj County
- Aliabad, Dashtabi, a village in Buin Zahra County
- Aliabad, Ramand, a village in Buin Zahra County
- Aliabad, Alamut-e Gharbi, a village in Qazvin County
- Aliabad, Tarom Sofla, a village in Qazvin County

=== Qom province ===
- Aliabad-e Enqelab, Qom, a village in Jafarabad County
- Aliabad-e Nazarali Khan, a village in Jafarabad County
- Aliabad, Qomrud, a village in Qom County
- Aliabad, Salafchegan, a village in Qom County

=== Razavi Khorasan province ===
==== Bardaskan County ====
- Ali Abadak, Bardaskan, a village
- Aliabad, Bardaskan, a village
- Aliabad-e Keshmar, a village

==== Chenaran County ====
- Aliabad, Chenaran, a village
- Aliabad-e Bahman Jan, a village

==== Dargaz County ====
- Aliabad-e Alanchag, a village

==== Fariman County ====
- Aliabad, Fariman, a village

==== Firuzeh County ====
- Aliabad, Firuzeh, a village
- Aliabad, Taghenkoh, a village

==== Golbahar County ====
- Aliabad, Golbahar, a village

==== Kashmar County ====
- Abkuh Aliabad, a village

==== Khalilabad County ====
- Aliabad-e Shur, Khalilabad, a village

==== Kuhsorkh County ====
- Aliabad, Kuhsorkh, a village

==== Khaf County ====
- Aliabad, Khaf, a village
- Aliabad-e Jadid, a village

==== Mahvelat County ====
- Aliabad-e Olya, Razavi Khorasan, a village
- Aliabad-e Sofla, Razavi Khorasan, a village
- Aliabad-e Vasat, a village

==== Mashhad County ====
- Aliabad, Mashhad, a village
- Aliabad-e Emam, alternate name of Shah Rah, a village

==== Nishapur County ====
- Aliabad, Nishapur, a village
- Aliabad-e Shahid, Razavi Khorasan, a village
- Aliabad-e Takeh, a village

==== Miyan Jolgeh County ====
- Aliabad, Miyan Jolgeh, a village

==== Quchan County ====
- Aliabad, Quchan, a village

==== Roshtkhar County ====
- Aliabad-e Daman, a village

==== Sabzevar County ====
- Aliabad-e Kalkhuni, a village
- Aliabad-e Shur, Sabzevar, a village

==== Sheshtamad County ====
- Aliabad-e Seyyed Rahim, a village
- Aliabad-e Tarkan, a village

==== Torbat-e Jam County ====
- Aliabad, Nasrabad, a village
- Aliabad, Pain Jam, a village

==== Zaveh County ====
- Aliabad, Zaveh, a village in Zaveh County

==== Zeberkhan County ====
- Aliabad, Zeberkhan, a village

=== Semnan province ===
- Aliabad-e Motalleb Khan, a village in Damghan County
- Aliabad, Mehdishahr, a village in Mehdishahr County
- Aliabad, Bastam, a village in Shahrud County
- Aliabad, Dehmolla, a village in Shahrud County

=== Sistan and Baluchestan province ===
- Aliabad (Aliabad-e Chahjangikhan), Dalgan, a village in Dalgan County
- Aliabad, Bampur, a village in Bampur County
- Aliabad, Dalgan, a village in Dalgan County
- Aliabad-e Goldasht, a village in Dalgan County
- Aliabad-e Ladi, a village in Dalgan County
- Aliabad, Bazman, a village in Iranshahr County
- Aliabad, Howmeh, a village in Iranshahr County
- Aliabad, Karvandar, alternate name of Aliabad-e Garnechin, a village in Khash County
- Aliabad, Sangan, a village in Khash County
- Aliabad, Qasr-e Qand, a village in Qasr-e Qand County
- Aliabad, Nukabad, a village in Taftan County

=== South Khorasan province ===
==== Birjand County ====
- Aliabad-e Davarabad, a village
- Aliabad-e Luleh, a village

==== Darmian County ====
- Aliabad, Darmian, a village
- Aliabad-e Fakhrud, a village
- Aliabad-e Farhang, a village

==== Eshqabad County ====
- Aliabad, Dastgerdan, a village

==== Khusf County ====
- Aliabad, Barakuh, a village
- Aliabad, Jolgeh-ye Mazhan, a village
- Aliabad, Khusf, a village
- Aliabad, Qaleh Zari, a village
- Aliabad-e Zarein, a village

==== Nehbandan County ====
- Aliabad, Arabkhaneh, alternate name of Kalateh-ye Aliabad, South Khorasan, a village
- Aliabad, Nehbandan, a village
- Aliabad-e Chah-e Shand, a village

==== Qaen County ====
- Aliabad Musaviyeh, a village
- Aliabad-e Olya, South Khorasan, a village
- Aliabad-e Sofla, South Khorasan, a village

==== Sarbisheh County ====
- Aliabad, Momenabad, a village
- Aliabad, Mud, a village
- Aliabad-e Kahak, a village

==== Tabas County ====
- Aliabad, Tabas, a village

==== Zirkuh County ====
- Aliabad, Zirkuh, a village in Zirkuh County

=== Tehran province ===
- Aliabad-e Vali, a village in Damavand County
- Aliabad, Eslamshahr, a village in Eslamshahr County
- Aliabad-e Tapancheh, a village in Eslamshahr County
- Aliabad-e Kharabeh, a village in Pakdasht County
- Aliabad-e Ahiyeh, alternate name of Ahiyeh, a village in Pishva County
- Aliabad-e Khaleseh, a village in Pishva County
- Aliabad-e Zavareh Bid, alternate name of Zavareh Bid, a village in Pishva County
- Aliabad-e Mowqufeh, a village in Ray County
- Aliabad-e Qeysariyyeh, a village in Ray County
- Aliabad, Robat Karim, a village in Robat Karim County
- Aliabad Drazeh, former name of the city of Shahedshahr in Shahriar County
- Aliabad-e Bagh-e Khvas, alternate name of Bagh-e Khvas, a village in Varamin County
- Aliabad-e Farasudeh, a village in Varamin County
- Aliabad-e Mohit, a village in Varamin County

=== West Azerbaijan province ===
- Aliabad, Chaldoran, a village in Chaldoran County
- Aliabad, Chaypareh, a village in Chaypareh County
- Aliabad, Maku, a village in Maku County
- Aliabad, Naqadeh, a village in Naqadeh County
- Aliabad, Dasht-e Bil, a village in Oshnavieh County
- Aliabad, Oshnavieh-ye Shomali, a village in Oshnavieh County
- Aliabad, Shahin Dezh, a village in Shahin Dezh County
- Aliabad, Takab, alternate name of Aliabad-e Nokhowd Darreh, a village in Takab County
- Aliabad, Urmia, a village in Urmia County
- Aliabad-e Baran Duz, a village in Urmia County

=== Yazd province ===
==== Ardakan County ====
- Aliabad, Kharanaq, a village

==== Ashkezar County ====
- Aliabad, Ashkezar, a village

==== Bafq County ====
- Aliabad-e Basab, a village
- Aliabad-e Gowd Ginestan, a village

==== Behabad County ====
- Aliabad, Jolgeh, a village

==== Khatam County ====
- Aliabad, Khatam, a village

==== Mehriz County ====
- Aliabad, Bahadoran, a village
- Aliabad, Ernan, a village

==== Taft County ====
- Aliabad, Aliabad, a village
- Aliabad, Banadkuk, a village
- Aliabad-e Sadri, a village
- Aliabad Rural District (Taft County), an administrative division

==== Yazd County ====
- Aliabad-e Dashti, a village

=== Zanjan province ===
- Aliabad, Abhar, a village in Abhar County
- Aliabad, Khodabandeh, a village in Khodabandeh County
- Aliabad, Zanjanrud, a village in Zanjan County
- Aliabad-e Moini, a village in Zanjan County
- Aliabad-e Sharqi, a village in Zanjan County

== Pakistan ==
- Aliabad, Abbottabad, a village in Abbottabad District
- Aliabad, Hunza, a town in Hunza District
- Aliabad, Sudhnoti, a village in Sudhnoti District

== See also ==
- Aliabad-e Bala (disambiguation)
- Aliabad-e Olya (disambiguation)
- Aliabad-e Pain (disambiguation)
- Aliabad-e Sofla (disambiguation)
- Aliabad-e Yek (disambiguation)
- Alinagar (disambiguation)
- Alipur (disambiguation)
- Mohammad Aliabad (disambiguation)
- Aliganj, a town in Uttar Pradesh, India
  - Aliganj (Assembly constituency)
- Aliganj, Raebareli, a village in Uttar Pradesh, India
