= Aliabad-e Puzeh Rowghan Cheraghi =

Aliabad-e Puzeh Rowghan Cheraghi علی‌آباد پوزه روغن چراغی
- Village
- Location within Iran
- Coordinates: 28°43′54″N 54°29′56″E
- Country: Iran
- Province: Fars
- County: Darab
- Bakhsh: Central
- Rural District: Hashivar

Population (2006)
  - Total: 189
- Time zone: UTC+3:30 (IRST)
  - Summer (DST): UTC+4:30 (IRDT)

Aliabad-e Puzeh Rowghan Cheraghi (Persian: علی‌آباد پوزه روغن چراغی, also Romanized as 'Alīābād-e Pūzeh Rowghan Cherāghī; also known as 'Alīābād) is a village in Hashivar Rural District, in the Central District of Darab County, Fars province, Iran. At the 2006 census, its population was 189, in 43 families.
