= Aliabad, Khenaman =

Aliabad علي اباد
- Village
- Location within Iran
- Coordinates: 30°28′09″N 56°29′09″E
- Country: Iran
- Province: Kerman
- County: Rafsanjan
- Bakhsh: Central
- Rural District: Khenaman

Population (2006)
  - Total: 31
- Time zone: UTC+3:30 (IRST)
  - Summer (DST): UTC+4:30 (IRDT)

Aliabad (Persian: علي اباد, also Romanized as ‘Alīābād; also known as ‘Alīābād-e Khenāmān) is a village in Khenaman Rural District, in the Central District of Rafsanjan County, Kerman Province, Iran. At the 2006 census, its population was 31, in 13 families.
