= Aliabad, Zirkuh =

Aliabad علی‌آباد
- Village
- Location within Iran
- Coordinates: 33°22′44″N 60°00′20″E
- Country: Iran
- Province: South Khorasan
- County: Zirkuh
- Bakhsh: Central District
- Rural District: Zirkuh

Population (2006)
  - Total: 95
- Time zone: UTC+3:30 (IRST)
  - Summer (DST): UTC+4:30 (IRDT)

Aliabad (Persian: علی‌آباد, also Romanized as ‘Alīābād) is a village in Zirkuh Rural District, Central District, Zirkuh County, South Khorasan Province, Iran. At the 2006 census, its population was 95, in 25 families.
