= Aliabad-e Vali =

Aliabad-e Vali علی آیاد والی
- Village
- Location within Iran
- Coordinates: 35°39′00″N 52°03′00″E
- Country: Iran
- Province: Tehran
- County: Damavand
- Bakhsh: Central
- Rural District: Tarrud

Population (2016)
  - Total: 62
- Time zone: UTC+3:30 (IRST)

Aliabad-e Vali (Persian: علی آباد والی, also Romanized as ‘Alīābād-e Vālī; also known as ‘Alīābād) is a village in Tarrud Rural District, in the Central District of Damavand County, Tehran Province, Iran. At the 2006 census, its population was 57, in 19 families. In 2016, it had 62 people in 18 households.
