= Aliabad Parsaneh =

Aliabad Parsaneh علي ابادپرسانه
- Village
- Location within Iran
- Coordinates: 33°29′24″N 48°45′44″E
- Country: Iran
- Province: Lorestan
- County: Khorramabad
- Bakhsh: Zagheh
- Rural District: Zagheh

Population (2006)
  - Total: 47
- Time zone: UTC+3:30 (IRST)
  - Summer (DST): UTC+4:30 (IRDT)

Aliabad Parsaneh (Persian: علي ابادپرسانه, also Romanized as ‘Alīābād-e Porsāneh and ‘Alīābād Parsaneh; also known as ‘Alīābād and ‘Alīābād-e Parmān) is a village in Zagheh Rural District, Zagheh District, Khorramabad County, Lorestan Province, Iran. At the 2006 census, its population was 47, in 11 families.
