= Aliabad-e Garnechin =

Aliabad-e Garnechin علي ابادگرنچين
- Village
- Location within Iran
- Coordinates: 28°05′39″N 61°30′05″E
- Country: Iran
- Province: Sistan and Baluchestan
- County: Khash
- Bakhsh: Central
- Rural District: Kuh Sefid

Population (2006)
  - Total: 179
- Time zone: UTC+3:30 (IRST)
  - Summer (DST): UTC+4:30 (IRDT)

Aliabad-e Garnechin (Persian: علي ابادگرنچين, also Romanized as ‘Alīābād-e Garnechīn; also known as ‘Alīābād) is a village in Kuh Sefid Rural District, in the Central District of Khash County, Sistan and Baluchestan Province, Iran. At the 2006 census, its population was 179, in 40 families.
