= Aliabad-e Alanchag =

Aliabad-e Alanchag علي ابادالنچگ
- Village
- Location within Iran
- Coordinates: 37°07′41″N 59°08′22″E
- Country: Iran
- Province: Razavi Khorasan
- County: Dargaz
- Bakhsh: Chapeshlu
- Rural District: Miankuh

Population (2006)
  - Total: 68
- Time zone: UTC+3:30 (IRST)
  - Summer (DST): UTC+4:30 (IRDT)

Aliabad-e Alanchag (Persian: علي ابادالنچگ, also Romanized as ‘Alīābād-e Ālanchag; also known as ‘Alīābād) is a village in Miankuh Rural District, Chapeshlu District, Dargaz County, Razavi Khorasan Province, Iran. At the 2006 census, its population was 68, in 17 families.

== See also ==
- List of cities, towns and villages in Razavi Khorasan Province
