= Aliabad-e Maran =

Aliabad-e Maran علي آباد مران
- Village
- Location within Iran
- Coordinates: 36°16′19″N 46°55′53″E
- Country: Iran
- Province: Kurdistan
- County: Divandarreh
- Bakhsh: Karaftu
- Rural District: Obatu

Population (2006)
  - Total: 142
- Time zone: UTC+3:30 (IRST)
  - Summer (DST): UTC+4:30 (IRDT)

Aliabad-e Maran (Persian: علي آباد مران, also Romanized as Alīābād-e Marān; also known as ‘Alīābād and ‘Alīābād-e Mardān) is a village in Obatu Rural District, Karaftu District, Divandarreh County, Kurdistan Province, Iran. At the 2006 census, its population was 142, in 34 families. The village is populated by Kurds.
