= Aliabad-e Garus =

Aliabad-e Garus علي ابادگروس
- Village
- Location within Iran
- Coordinates: 34°23′32″N 47°42′57″E
- Country: Iran
- Province: Kermanshah
- County: Sahneh
- Bakhsh: Central
- Rural District: Sahneh

Population (2006)
  - Total: 108
- Time zone: UTC+3:30 (IRST)
  - Summer (DST): UTC+4:30 (IRDT)

Aliabad-e Garus (Persian: علي ابادگروس, also Romanized as ‘Alīābād-e Garūs) is a village in Sahneh Rural District, in the Central District of Sahneh County, Kermanshah Province, Iran. At the 2006 census, its population was 108, in 23 families.
