= Aliabad-e Khazayi-ye Aliabad-e Marki =

Village in Kerman province, Iran

Aliabad-e Khazayi-ye Aliabad-e Marki Persian: علي ابادخزايي علي ابادماركي
- Village
- Country: Iran
- Province: Kerman
- County: Jiroft
- District: Esmaili
- Rural District: Hoseynabad

Population (2016)
  - Total: 89
- Time zone: UTC+3:30 (IRST)

Aliabad-e Khazayi-ye Aliabad-e Marki (Persian: علي ابادخزايي علي ابادماركي) (Note: Also romanized as ‘Alīābād-e Khazāyī-ye ‘Alīābād-e Mārḵī) is a village in Hoseynabad Rural District of Esmaili District, Jiroft County, Kerman province, Iran.

== Demographics ==
=== Population ===
At the time of the 2006 National Census, the village's population was 129 in 28 households, when it was in Anbarabad County. The following census in 2011 counted 95 people in 20 households, by which time the district had been separated from the county to join Jiroft County. The 2016 census measured the population of the village as 89 people in 24 households.
