= Aliabad-e Moshir =

Aliabad-e Moshir علي آباد مشير
- Village
- Location within Iran
- Coordinates: 35°12′51″N 47°28′01″E
- Country: Iran
- Province: Kurdistan
- County: Dehgolan
- Bakhsh: Central
- Rural District: Howmeh-ye Dehgolan

Population (2006)
  - Total: 694
- Time zone: UTC+3:30 (IRST)
  - Summer (DST): UTC+4:30 (IRDT)

Aliabad-e Moshir (Persian: علي آباد مشير, also Romanized as ‘Alīābād-e Moshīr; also known as ‘Alīābād) is a village in Howmeh-ye Dehgolan Rural District, in the Central District of Dehgolan County, Kurdistan Province, Iran. At the 2006 census, its population was 694, in 147 families. The village is populated by Kurds.
