= Aliabad, Tombi Golgir =

Aliabad علي اباد
- Village
- Location within Iran
- Coordinates: 31°50′41″N 49°27′48″E
- Country: Iran
- Province: Khuzestan
- County: Masjed Soleyman
- Bakhsh: Golgir
- Rural District: Tombi Golgir

Population (2006)
  - Total: 20
- Time zone: UTC+3:30 (IRST)
  - Summer (DST): UTC+4:30 (IRDT)

Aliabad (Persian: علي اباد, also Romanized as `Aliābād; also known as ‘Alīābād-e Chahār Bīsheh) is a village in Tombi Golgir Rural District, Golgir District, Masjed Soleyman County, Khuzestan Province, Iran. At the 2006 census, its population was 20, in 4 families.
