= Aliabad, Sudhnoti =

Aliabad
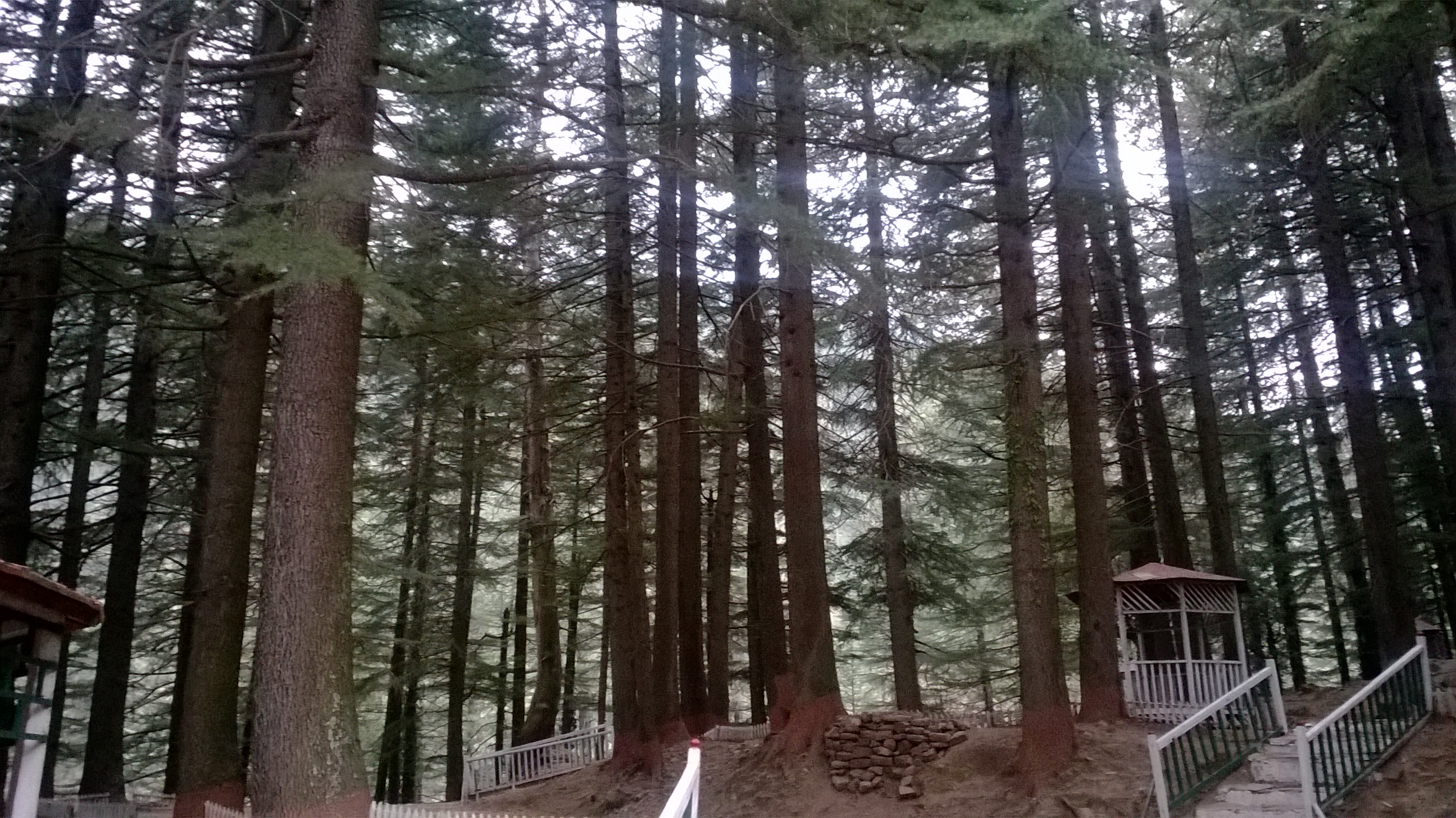
- Pine Trees
- Country: Pakistan
- Territory: Azad Kashmir
- District: Sudhnoti
- Elevation: 2,134 m (7,001 ft)
- Time zone: UTC+5 (PST)

Aliabad is a village in the Sudhnoti District of Azad Kashmir. It lies at an altitude of approximately 2,134 metres (7,001 ft) and is about 112 kilometres (70 mi) from Rawalakot. The area is surrounded by dense mixed forests of deodar and blue pine.
