= Aliabad-e Davarabad =

Aliabad-e Davarabad علي ابادداوراباد
- Village
- Location within Iran
- Coordinates: 32°49′42″N 59°26′00″E
- Country: Iran
- Province: South Khorasan
- County: Birjand
- Bakhsh: Central
- Rural District: Baqeran

Population (2006)
  - Total: 199
- Time zone: UTC+3:30 (IRST)
  - Summer (DST): UTC+4:30 (IRDT)

Aliabad-e Davarabad (Persian: علي ابادداوراباد, also Romanized as ‘Alīābād-e Dāvarābād; also known as ‘Alīābād and ‘Alīābād Sarkār) is a village in Baqeran Rural District, in the Central District of Birjand County, South Khorasan Province, Iran. At the 2006 census, its population was 199, in 53 families.
