= Aliabad, Ramand =

Aliabad علی‌آباد
- Village
- Location within Iran
- Coordinates: 35°55′00″N 49°52′00″E
- Country: Iran
- Province: Qazvin
- County: Buin Zahra
- Bakhsh: Ramand
- Rural District: Ebrahimabad

Population (2006)
  - Total: 33
- Time zone: UTC+3:30 (IRST)
  - Summer (DST): UTC+4:30 (IRDT)

Aliabad (Persian: علی‌آباد, also Romanized as ‘Alīābād) is a village in Ebrahimabad Rural District, Ramand District, Buin Zahra County, Qazvin Province, Iran. At the 2006 census, its population was 33, in 13 families.
