= Aliabad, Golbaf =

Aliabad علي اباد
- Village
- Location within Iran
- Coordinates: 29°40′00″N 58°01′00″E
- Country: Iran
- Province: Kerman
- County: Kerman
- Bakhsh: Golbaf
- Rural District: Keshit

Population (2006)
  - Total: 18
- Time zone: UTC+3:30 (IRST)
  - Summer (DST): UTC+4:30 (IRDT)

Aliabad (Persian: علي اباد, also Romanized as ‘Alīābād) is a village in Keshit Rural District, Golbaf District, Kerman County, Kerman Province, Iran. At the 2006 census, its population was 18, in 5 families.
