= Aliabad-e Chahi =

Aliabad-e Chahi علي ابادچاهي
- Village
- Location within Iran
- Coordinates: 33°26′24″N 48°30′24″E
- Country: Iran
- Province: Lorestan
- County: Khorramabad
- Bakhsh: Central
- Rural District: Dehpir

Population (2006)
  - Total: 98
- Time zone: UTC+3:30 (IRST)
  - Summer (DST): UTC+4:30 (IRDT)

Aliabad-e Chahi (Persian: علي ابادچاهي, also Romanized as 'Alīābād-e Chāhī) is a village in Dehpir Rural District, in the Central District of Khorramabad County, Lorestan Province, Iran. At the 2006 census, its population was 98, in 20 families.
