= Aliabad, Deris =

Aliabad علي اباد
- Village
- Location within Iran
- Coordinates: 29°39′53″N 51°35′41″E
- Country: Iran
- Province: Fars
- County: Kazerun
- Bakhsh: Central
- Rural District: Deris

Population (2006)
  - Total: 519
- Time zone: UTC+3:30 (IRST)
  - Summer (DST): UTC+4:30 (IRDT)

Aliabad (Persian: علي اباد, also Romanized as 'Alīābād) is a village in Deris Rural District, in the Central District of Kazerun County, Fars province, Iran. At the 2006 census, its population was 519, in 89 families.
