= Aliabad-e Musehli =

Aliabad-e Musehli علي ابادموسه لي
- Village
- Location within Iran
- Coordinates: 29°20′57″N 51°50′50″E
- Country: Iran
- Province: Fars
- County: Kazerun
- Bakhsh: Jereh and Baladeh
- Rural District: Dadin

Population (2006)
  - Total: 508
- Time zone: UTC+3:30 (IRST)
  - Summer (DST): UTC+4:30 (IRDT)

Aliabad-e Musehli (Persian: علي ابادموسه لي, also Romanized as 'Alīābād-e Mūsehlī; also known as 'Alīābād) is a village in Dadin Rural District, Jereh and Baladeh District, Kazerun County, Fars province, Iran. At the 2006 census, its population was 508, in 105 families.
