= Aliabad, Sepidan =

Aliabad علي اباد
- Village
- Location within Iran
- Coordinates: 30°03′37″N 51°59′12″E
- Country: Iran
- Province: Fars
- County: Sepidan
- Bakhsh: Hamaijan
- Rural District: Sornabad

Population (2006)
  - Total: 237
- Time zone: UTC+3:30 (IRST)
  - Summer (DST): UTC+4:30 (IRDT)

Aliabad (Persian: علي اباد, also Romanized as 'Alīābād and 'Alī Ābād; also known as Ahābād) is a village in Sornabad Rural District, Hamaijan District, Sepidan County, Fars province, Iran. At the 2006 census, its population was 237, in 68 families.
