= Aliabad-e Zahd Mahmud =

Aliabad-e Zahd Mahmud علي اباد زاهد محمود
- Village
- Location within Iran
- Coordinates: 27°34′58″N 55°10′25″E
- Country: Iran
- Province: Fars
- County: Larestan
- Bakhsh: Central
- Rural District: Howmeh

Population (2006)
  - Total: 183
- Time zone: UTC+3:30 (IRST)
  - Summer (DST): UTC+4:30 (IRDT)

Aliabad-e Zahd Mahmud (Persian: علي اباد زاهد محمود, also romanized as 'Alīābād-e Zāhd Maḩmūd; also known as 'Alīābād-e Zād Maḩmūd) is a village in Howmeh Rural District, in the Central District of Larestan County, Fars province, Iran. At the 2006 census, its population was 183, in 42 families.
