= Aliabad, Howmeh =

Aliabad علي اباد
- Village
- Location within Iran
- Coordinates: 27°11′58″N 60°43′20″E
- Country: Iran
- Province: Sistan and Baluchestan
- County: Iranshahr
- Bakhsh: Central
- Rural District: Howmeh

Population (2006)
  - Total: 2,984
- Time zone: UTC+3:30 (IRST)
  - Summer (DST): UTC+4:30 (IRDT)

Ali Abad, Sistan and Baluchestan Province, Iran (2008)

Aliabad (Persian: علي اباد, also Romanized as ‘Alīābād) is a village in Howmeh Rural District, in the Central District of Iranshahr County, Sistan and Baluchestan Province, Iran. At the 2006 census, its population was 2,984, in 581 families.
