= Aliabad, Banadkuk =

Aliabad علي اباد
- Village
- Location within Iran
- Coordinates: 31°29′12″N 53°57′33″E
- Country: Iran
- Province: Yazd
- County: Taft
- Bakhsh: Nir
- Rural District: Banadkuk

Population (2006)
  - Total: 25
- Time zone: UTC+3:30 (IRST)
  - Summer (DST): UTC+4:30 (IRDT)

Aliabad (Persian: علي اباد, romanized: Alīābād; also known as ‘Alīābād-e Banād Kūk) is a village in Banadkuk Rural District, Nir District, Taft County, Yazd Province, Iran. At the 2006 census, its population was 25, in 9 families.
