= Aliabad, Dashti =

Village in Bushehr, Iran

Aliabad علی‌آباد
- Village
- Country: Iran
- Province: Bushehr
- County: Dashti
- Bakhsh: Kaki
- Rural District: Kaki

Population (2006)
  - Total: 128
- Time zone: UTC+3:30 (IRST)
  - Summer (DST): UTC+4:30 (IRDT)

Aliabad (Persian: علی‌آباد, also Romanized as ʿAlīābād) is a village in Kaki Rural District, Kaki District, Dashti County, Bushehr Province, Iran. At the 2006 census, its population was 128, in 32 families.
