= Aliabad-e Sistaniha =

Aliabad-e Sistaniha علي آبادسيستانيها
- Village
- Location within Iran
- Coordinates: 37°11′50″N 55°07′39″E
- Country: Iran
- Province: Golestan
- County: Gonbad-e Qabus
- Bakhsh: Central
- Rural District: Soltanali

Population (2006)
  - Total: 389
- Time zone: UTC+3:30 (IRST)
  - Summer (DST): UTC+4:30 (IRDT)

Aliabad-e Sistaniha (Persian: علي آبادسيستانيها, also Romanized as ʿAlīābād-e Sīstānīhā) is a village in Soltanali Rural District, in the Central District of Gonbad-e Qabus County, Golestan Province, Iran. At the 2006 census, its population was 389, in 91 families.
