= Aliabad, Borujen =

Village in Chaharmahal and Bakhtiari, Iran

Aliabad علی‌آباد
- Village
- Location within Iran
- Coordinates: 31°56′44″N 50°49′34″E
- Country: Iran
- Province: Chaharmahal and Bakhtiari
- County: Borujen
- Bakhsh: Boldaji
- Rural District: Chaghakhor

Population (2006)
  - Total: 42
- Time zone: UTC+3:30 (IRST)
  - Summer (DST): UTC+4:30 (IRDT)

Aliabad (Persian: علی‌آباد, also Romanized as ‘Alīābād) is a village in Chaghakhor Rural District, Boldaji District, Borujen County, Chaharmahal and Bakhtiari Province, Iran. At the 2006 census, its population was 42, in 13 families. The village is populated by Lurs.
