= Aliabad-e Kerend =

Aliabad-e Kerend علي ابادكرند
- Village
- Location within Iran
- Coordinates: 34°14′28″N 46°17′08″E
- Country: Iran
- Province: Kermanshah
- County: Dalahu
- Bakhsh: Central
- Rural District: Howmeh-ye Kerend

Population (2006)
  - Total: 39
- Time zone: UTC+3:30 (IRST)
  - Summer (DST): UTC+4:30 (IRDT)

Aliabad-e Kerend (Persian: علي ابادكرند, also Romanized as ‘Alīābād-e Kerend; also known as ‘Alīābād and ‘Alīābād-e Ţelesm) is a village in Howmeh-ye Kerend Rural District, in the Central District of Dalahu County, Kermanshah Province, Iran. At the 2006 census, its population was 39, in 7 families.
