= Aliabad, Mud =

Aliabad علي آباد
- Village
- Location within Iran
- Coordinates: 32°39′46″N 59°31′18″E
- Country: Iran
- Province: South Khorasan
- County: Sarbisheh
- Bakhsh: Mud
- Rural District: Mud

Population (2006)
  - Total: 29
- Time zone: UTC+3:30 (IRST)
  - Summer (DST): UTC+4:30 (IRDT)

Aliabad (Persian: علي آباد, also Romanized as ‘Alīābād; also known as Ali Abad Nahar Khan) is a village in Mud Rural District, Mud District, Sarbisheh County, South Khorasan Province, Iran. At the 2006 census, its population was 29, in 11 families.
