= Aliabad-e Vosta =

Aliabad-e Vosta علي ابادوسطي
- Village
- Location within Iran
- Coordinates: 33°40′54″N 46°35′27″E
- Country: Iran
- Province: Ilam
- County: Sirvan
- Bakhsh: Karezan
- Rural District: Karezan

Population (2006)
  - Total: 68
- Time zone: UTC+3:30 (IRST)
  - Summer (DST): UTC+4:30 (IRDT)

Aliabad-e Vosta (Persian: علي ابادوسطي, also Romanized as ‘Ālīābād-e Vosţá) is a village in Karezan Rural District, Karezan District, Sirvan County Ilam Province, Iran. At the 2006 census, its population was 68, in 15 families. The village is populated by Kurds.
