= Aliabad-e Kuh Namaki =

Aliabad-e Kuh Namaki علی‌آباد کوه نمکی
- Village
- Location within Iran
- Coordinates: 31°35′48″N 56°35′46″E
- Country: Iran
- Province: Kerman
- County: Ravar
- Bakhsh: Central
- Rural District: Ravar

Population (2006)
  - Total: 23
- Time zone: UTC+3:30 (IRST)
  - Summer (DST): UTC+4:30 (IRDT)

Aliabad-e Kuh Namaki (Persian: علی‌آباد کوه نمکی, also Romanized as ‘Alīābād-e Kūh Namakī; also known as ‘Alīābād Namakī) is a village in Ravar Rural District, in the Central District of Ravar County, Kerman Province, Iran. At the 2006 census, its population was 23, in 8 families.
