= Aliabad-e Dashti =

Aliabad-e Dashti علي اباددشتي
- Village
- Country: Iran
- Province: Yazd
- County: Yazd
- Bakhsh: Central
- Rural District: Fahraj

Population (2006)
  - Total: 149
- Time zone: UTC+3:30 (IRST)
  - Summer (DST): UTC+4:30 (IRDT)

Aliabad-e Dashti (Persian: علي اباددشتي, also Romanized as ‘Alīābād-e Dashtī) is a village in Fahraj Rural District, in the Central District of Yazd County, Yazd Province, Iran. At the 2006 census, its population was 149, in 24 families.
