= Aliabad-e Yek =

Aliabad-e Yek (Persian: علي اباديك) may refer to:

- Aliabad-e Yek, Baft
- Aliabad-e Yek, Rafsanjan
- Aliabad-e Yek, Ravar
- Aliabad-e Shomareh-ye Yek, Sirjan County
