= Bag Reza =

Bag Reza بگ رضا
- Village
- Location within Iran
- Coordinates: 33°28′06″N 48°49′58″E
- Country: Iran
- Province: Lorestan
- County: Khorramabad
- Bakhsh: Zagheh
- Rural District: Qaedrahmat

Population (2006)
  - Total: 319
- Time zone: UTC+3:30 (IRST)
  - Summer (DST): UTC+4:30 (IRDT)

Bag Reza (Persian: بگ رضا, also Romanized as Bag Rezā; also known as Beyg Reẕā, ‘Alīābād-e Beyg Reẕā, and ‘Alīābād-e Beyg Rezā) is a village in Qaedrahmat Rural District, Zagheh District, Khorramabad County, Lorestan Province, Iran. At the 2006 census, its population was 319, in 71 families.
