= Aliabad Piameni =

Aliabad Piameni علي ابادپيامني
- Village
- Location within Iran
- Coordinates: 33°26′14″N 48°30′03″E
- Country: Iran
- Province: Lorestan
- County: Khorramabad
- Bakhsh: Central
- Rural District: Azna

Population (2006)
  - Total: 68
- Time zone: UTC+3:30 (IRST)
  - Summer (DST): UTC+4:30 (IRDT)

Aliabad Piameni (Persian: علي ابادپيامني, also Romanized as ‘Ālīābād Pīāmenī; also known as ‘Ālīābād) is a village in Azna Rural District, in the Central District of Khorramabad County, Lorestan Province, Iran. At the 2006 census, its population was 68, in 16 families.
