= Aliabad-e Bezindar =

Aliabad-e Bezindar علي آباد بزيندر
- Village
- Location within Iran
- Coordinates: 35°03′27″N 46°57′36″E
- Country: Iran
- Province: Kurdistan
- County: Sanandaj
- Bakhsh: Central
- Rural District: Naran

Population (2006)
  - Total: 31
- Time zone: UTC+3:30 (IRST)
  - Summer (DST): UTC+4:30 (IRDT)

Aliabad-e Bezindar (Persian: علي آباد بزيندر, also Romanized as ‘Alīābād-e Bezīndar; also known as ‘Alīābād) is a village in Naran Rural District, in the Central District of Sanandaj County, Kurdistan Province, Iran. At the 2006 census, its population was 31, in 9 families. The village is populated by Kurds.
