= Aliabad, Dasht-e Bil =

Aliabad علی‌آباد
- Village
- Country: Iran
- Province: West Azerbaijan
- County: Oshnavieh
- Bakhsh: Central
- Rural District: Dasht-e Bil

Population (2006)
  - Total: 102
- Time zone: UTC+3:30 (IRST)
  - Summer (DST): UTC+4:30 (IRDT)

Aliabad (Persian: علی‌آباد, also Romanized as ‘Alīābād) is a village in Dasht-e Bil Rural District, in the Central District of Oshnavieh County, West Azerbaijan Province, Iran. At the 2006 census, its population was 102, in 20 families.
