= Aliabad-e Takeh =

Aliabad-e Takeh علي ابادتكه
- Village
- Location within Iran
- Coordinates: 36°06′33″N 58°47′46″E
- Country: Iran
- Province: Razavi Khorasan
- County: Nishapur
- Bakhsh: Central
- Rural District: Rivand

Population (2006)
  - Total: 20
- Time zone: UTC+3:30 (IRST)
  - Summer (DST): UTC+4:30 (IRDT)

Aliabad-e Takeh (Persian: علي ابادتكه, also Romanized as ‘Alīābād-e Taḵeh; also known as ‘Alīābād) is a village in Rivand Rural District, in the Central District of Nishapur County, Razavi Khorasan Province, Iran. At the 2006 census, its population was 20, in 5 families.

== See also ==
- List of cities, towns and villages in Razavi Khorasan Province
