= Aliabad, Hanza =

Aliabad علی‌آباد
- Village
- Location within Iran
- Coordinates: 29°14′04″N 57°03′29″E
- Country: Iran
- Province: Kerman
- County: Rabor
- Bakhsh: Hanza
- Rural District: Hanza
- Time zone: UTC+3:30 (IRST)
  - Summer (DST): UTC+4:30 (IRDT)

Aliabad (Persian: علی‌آباد, also Romanized as ‘Alīābād) is a village in Hanza Rural District, Hanza District, Rabor County, Kerman Province, Iran.
