= Aliganj, Raebareli =

Aliganj Alīganj
- Village
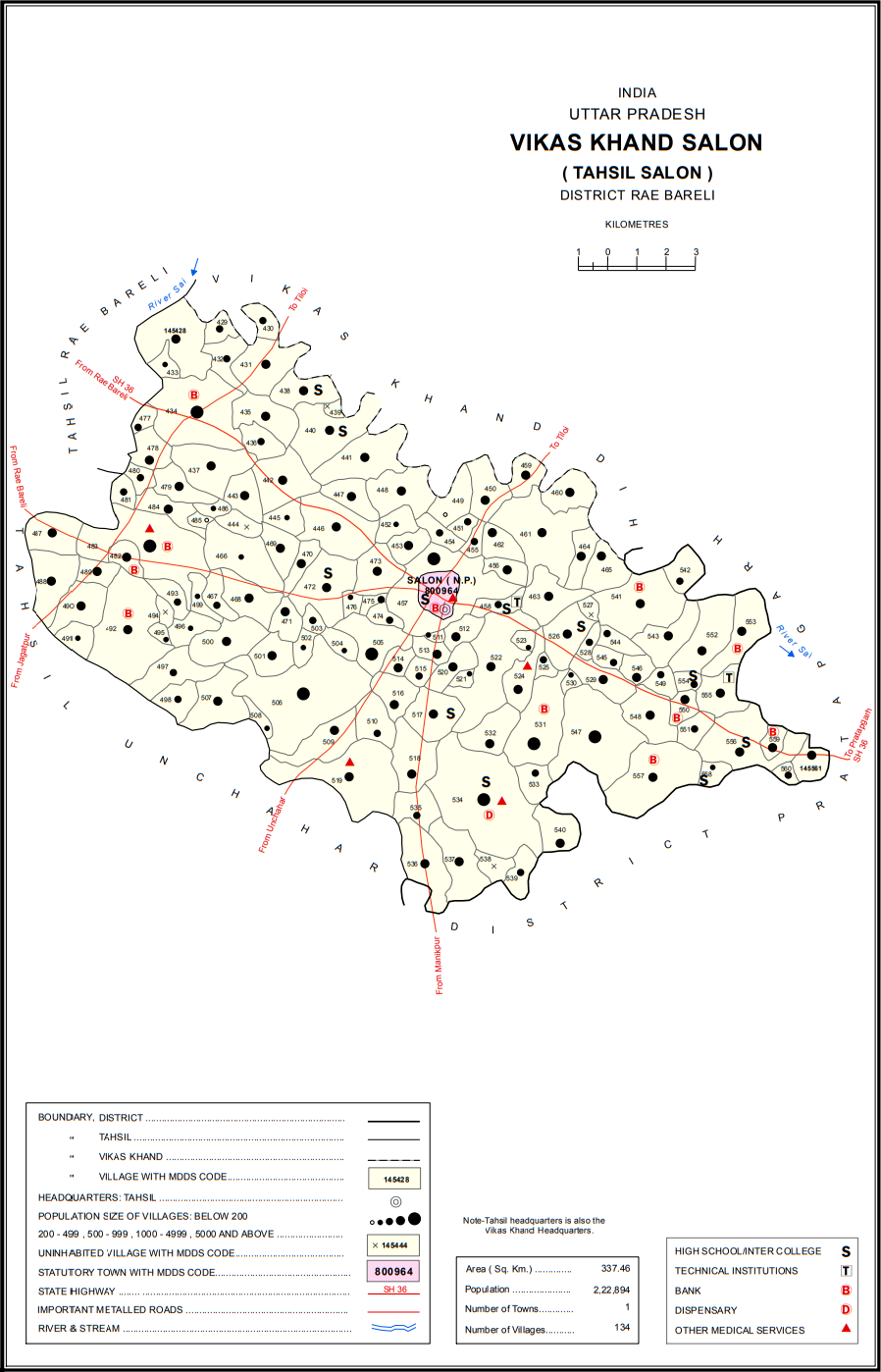
- Map showing Aliganj (#482) in Salon CD block

- Location in Uttar Pradesh, India
- Coordinates: 26.036023°N 81.344287°E
- Country: India
- State: Uttar Pradesh
- District: Raebareli

Area
  - Total: 1.035 km^{2} (0.400 sq mi)

Population (2011)
  - Total: 1,042
  - Density: 1,007/km^{2} (2,608/sq mi)

Languages
  - Official: Hindi
- Time zone: UTC+5:30 (IST)
- Vehicle registration: UP-35

Aliganj is a village in Salon block of Rae Bareli district, Uttar Pradesh, India. It is located 28 km from Raebareli, the district headquarters. As of 2011, Aliganj has a population of 1,042 people, in 191 households. It has no schools and no healthcare facilities, and it hosts both a permanent market and a periodic haat.

The 1961 census recorded Aliganj as comprising 2 hamlets, with a total population of 408 people (215 male and 193 female), in 88 households and 88 physical houses. The area of the village was given as 258 acres.

The 1981 census recorded Aliganj as having a population of 554 people, in 147 households, and having an area of 104.41 hectares. The main staple foods were given as wheat and rice.
