= Aliabad-e Ab Kaseh =

Aliabad-e Ab Kaseh علي اباد اب كاسه
- Village
- Location within Iran
- Coordinates: 30°38′38″N 50°30′36″E
- Country: Iran
- Province: Kohgiluyeh and Boyer-Ahmad
- County: Kohgiluyeh
- Bakhsh: Central
- Rural District: Dehdasht-e Gharbi

Population (2006)
  - Total: 178
- Time zone: UTC+3:30 (IRST)
  - Summer (DST): UTC+4:30 (IRDT)

Aliabad-e Ab Kaseh (Persian: علي اباد اب كاسه, also Romanized as ‘Alīābād-e Āb Kāseh; also known as ‘Alīābād) is a village in Dehdasht-e Gharbi Rural District, in the Central District of Kohgiluyeh County, Kohgiluyeh and Boyer-Ahmad Province, Iran. At the 2006 census, its population was 178, in 40 families.
