= Aliabad-e Golbanu =

Aliabad-e Golbanu علي ابادگل بانو
- Village
- Location within Iran
- Coordinates: 34°24′13″N 46°33′04″E
- Country: Iran
- Province: Kermanshah
- County: Kermanshah
- Bakhsh: Kuzaran
- Rural District: Haft Ashiyan

Population (2006)
  - Total: 40
- Time zone: UTC+3:30 (IRST)
  - Summer (DST): UTC+4:30 (IRDT)

Aliabad-e Golbanu (Persian: علي ابادگل بانو, also Romanized as ‘Alīābād-e Golbānū; also known as ‘Alīābād) is a village in Haft Ashiyan Rural District, Kuzaran District, Kermanshah County, Kermanshah Province, Iran. In the 2006 census, its population was listed as 40 individuals and 9 families.
