= Aliabad, Fariman =

Aliabad علي اباد
- Village
- Location within Iran
- Coordinates: 35°57′30″N 59°38′04″E
- Country: Iran
- Province: Razavi Khorasan
- County: Fariman
- Bakhsh: Central
- Rural District: Sang Bast

Population (2006)
  - Total: 82
- Time zone: UTC+3:30 (IRST)
  - Summer (DST): UTC+4:30 (IRDT)

Aliabad (Persian: علي اباد, also Romanized as ‘Alīābād) is a village in Sang Bast Rural District, in the Central District of Fariman County, Razavi Khorasan Province, Iran. At the 2006 census, its population was 82, in 25 families.

== See also ==
- List of cities, towns and villages in Razavi Khorasan Province
