= Aliabad, Eqlid =

Aliabad علی‌آباد
- Village
- Location within Iran
- Coordinates: 30°46′12″N 52°33′31″E
- Country: Iran
- Province: Fars
- County: Eqlid
- Bakhsh: Central
- Rural District: Khonjesht

Population (2006)
  - Total: 589
- Time zone: UTC+3:30 (IRST)
  - Summer (DST): UTC+4:30 (IRDT)

Aliabad (Persian: علی‌آباد, also Romanized as 'Alīābād) is a village in Khonjesht Rural District, in the Central District of Eqlid County, Fars province, Iran. At the 2006 census, its population was 589, in 134 families.
