= Aliabad, Saqqez =

Aliabad علي آباد
- Village
- Location within Iran
- Coordinates: 36°15′27″N 46°32′55″E
- Country: Iran
- Province: Kurdistan
- County: Saqqez
- Bakhsh: Ziviyeh
- Rural District: Saheb

Population (2006)
  - Total: 115
- Time zone: UTC+3:30 (IRST)
  - Summer (DST): UTC+4:30 (IRDT)

Aliabad (Persian: علي آباد, also Romanized as ‘Alīābād) is a village in Saheb Rural District, Ziviyeh District, Saqqez County, Kurdistan Province, Iran. At the 2006 census, its population was 115, in 21 families. The village is populated by Kurds.
