= Aliabad-e Do, Bam =

Aliabad-e Do علي آباد2
- Village
- Location within Iran
- Coordinates: 28°58′00″N 57°54′00″E
- Country: Iran
- Province: Kerman
- County: Bam
- Bakhsh: Central
- Rural District: Howmeh

Population (2006)
  - Total: 23
- Time zone: UTC+3:30 (IRST)
  - Summer (DST): UTC+4:30 (IRDT)

Aliabad-e Do (Persian: علي آباد2, also Romanized as ‘Alīābād-e Do; also known as ‘Aliābād and ‘Alīābād) is a village in Howmeh Rural District, in the Central District of Bam County, Kerman Province, Iran. At the 2006 census, its population was 23, in 5 families.
