= Aliabad-e Kahak =

Aliabad-e Kahak علي ابادكهك
- Village
- Location within Iran
- Coordinates: 32°40′25″N 59°41′03″E
- Country: Iran
- Province: South Khorasan
- County: Sarbisheh
- Bakhsh: Central
- Rural District: Momenabad

Population (2006)
  - Total: 61
- Time zone: UTC+3:30 (IRST)
  - Summer (DST): UTC+4:30 (IRDT)

Aliabad-e Kahak (Persian: علي ابادكهك, also Romanized as ‘Alīābād-e Kahak; also known as ‘Alīābād , ‘Alīābād-e Kahak Rūd, ‘Alīābād-e Sar Bīsheh, and Ali Abad Mo’men Abad) is a village in Momenabad Rural District, in the Central District of Sarbisheh County, South Khorasan Province, Iran. According to the 2006 census, it had a population of 61, residing in 12 families.
