= Aliabad-e Hojjat =

Aliabad-e Hojjat علی‌آباد حجت
- Village
- Location within Iran
- Coordinates: 30°21′02″N 57°56′55″E
- Country: Iran
- Province: Kerman
- County: Kerman
- Bakhsh: Shahdad
- Rural District: Takab

Population (2006)
  - Total: 114
- Time zone: UTC+3:30 (IRST)
  - Summer (DST): UTC+4:30 (IRDT)

Aliabad-e Hojjat (Persian: علی‌آباد حجت, also Romanized as ‘Alīābād-e Ḩojjat; also known as ‘Alīābād and ‘Alīābād-e Moz̧affarī) is a village in Takab Rural District, Shahdad District, Kerman County, Kerman Province, Iran. At the 2006 census, its population was 114, in 24 families.
