= Aliabad-e Kashantu =

Aliabad-e Kashantu علي ابادكاشانتو
- Village
- Location within Iran
- Coordinates: 34°27′33″N 47°28′19″E
- Country: Iran
- Province: Kermanshah
- County: Harsin
- Bakhsh: Bisotun
- Rural District: Cham Chamal

Population (2006)
  - Total: 81
- Time zone: UTC+3:30 (IRST)
  - Summer (DST): UTC+4:30 (IRDT)

Aliabad-e Kashantu (Persian: علي ابادكاشانتو, also Romanized as ‘Alīābād-e Kāshāntū) is a village in Cham Chamal Rural District, Bisotun District, Harsin County, Kermanshah Province, Iran. At the 2006 census, its population was 81, in 20 families.
