= Aliabad, Ashkezar =

Village in Yazd province, Iran

Aliabad Persian: علي اباد
- Village
- Location within Iran
- Coordinates: 32°03′49″N 54°12′17″E
- Country: Iran
- Province: Yazd
- County: Ashkezar
- District: Central
- Rural District: Rostaq

Population (2011)
  - Total: Below reporting threshold
- Time zone: UTC+3:30 (IRST)

Aliabad (Persian: علي اباد) (Note: Also romanized as ‘Alīābād; also known as Ali Abad Rastagh and Hājīābād) is a village in Rostaq Rural District of the Central District of Ashkezar County, (Note: Formerly Saduq County) Yazd province, Iran.

== Demographics ==
=== Population ===
At the time of the 2006 National Census, the village's population was 12 in eight households. The population at the following census in 2011 was below the reporting threshold, and the village did not appear in the 2016 census.
