= Aliabad, Barzavand =

Aliabad علی‌آباد
- Village
- Location within Iran
- Coordinates: 33°02′00″N 52°24′27″E
- Country: Iran
- Province: Isfahan
- County: Ardestan
- Bakhsh: Central
- Rural District: Barzavand

Population (2006)
  - Total: 23
- Time zone: UTC+3:30 (IRST)
  - Summer (DST): UTC+4:30 (IRDT)

Aliabad (Persian: علی‌آباد, also Romanized as ‘Alīābād and Alīābād; also known as ‘Alīābād-e Qohsār) is a village in Barzavand Rural District, in the Central District of Ardestan County, Isfahan Province, Iran. At the 2006 census, its population was 23, in 11 families.
