= Aliabad, Ekhtiarabad =

Aliabad علي اباد
- Village
- Location within Iran
- Coordinates: 30°12′41″N 57°05′33″E
- Country: Iran
- Province: Kerman
- County: Kerman
- Bakhsh: Central
- Rural District: Ekhtiarabad

Population (2006)
  - Total: 42
- Time zone: UTC+3:30 (IRST)

Aliabad (Persian: علي اباد, also Romanized as ‘Alīābād) is a village in Ekhtiarabad Rural District, in the Central District of Kerman County, Kerman Province, Iran. At the 2006 census, its population was 42, in 10 families.
