= Aliabad, Andika =

Aliabad عالي اباد
- Village
- Location within Iran
- Coordinates: 32°13′34″N 49°33′06″E
- Country: Iran
- Province: Khuzestan
- County: Andika
- Bakhsh: Central
- Rural District: Shalal and Dasht-e Gol

Population (2006)
  - Total: 112
- Time zone: UTC+3:30 (IRST)
  - Summer (DST): UTC+4:30 (IRDT)

Aliabad (Persian: عالي اباد, also Romanized as ‘Ālīābād) is a village in Shalal and Dasht-e Gol Rural District, in the Central District of Andika County, Khuzestan Province, Iran. At the 2006 census, its population was 112, in 19 families.
