= Aliabad-e Yalghuz Aghaj =

Aliabad-e Yalghuz Aghaj علي آباد يالغوز آغاج
- Village
- Location within Iran
- Coordinates: 35°19′37″N 47°36′09″E
- Country: Iran
- Province: Kurdistan
- County: Qorveh
- Bakhsh: Serishabad
- Rural District: Yalghuz Aghaj

Population (2006)
  - Total: 270
- Time zone: UTC+3:30 (IRST)
  - Summer (DST): UTC+4:30 (IRDT)

Aliabad-e Yalghuz Aghaj (Persian: علي آباد يالغوز آغاج, also Romanized as ‘Alīābād-e Yālghūz Āghāj; also known as ‘Alīābād) is a village in Yalghuz Aghaj Rural District, Serishabad District, Qorveh County, Kurdistan Province, Iran. At the 2006 census, its population was 270, in 62 families. The village is populated by Kurds.
