= Aliabad-e Sorkhak =

Aliabad-e Sorkhak علي ابادسرخك
- Village
- Location within Iran
- Coordinates: 29°08′23″N 53°37′40″E
- Country: Iran
- Province: Fars
- County: Fasa
- Bakhsh: Central
- Rural District: Jangal

Population (2006)
  - Total: 254
- Time zone: UTC+3:30 (IRST)
  - Summer (DST): UTC+4:30 (IRDT)

Aliabad-e Sorkhak (Persian: علي ابادسرخك, also Romanized as 'Alīābād-e Sorkhak; also known as 'Alīābād-e Sorkheh and Sorkhak) is a village in Jangal Rural District, in the Central District of Fasa County, Fars province, Iran. At the 2006 census, its population was 254, in 58 families.
