= Aliabad-e Shamshir Bar =

Aliabad-e Shamshir Bar علي ابادشمشيربر
- Village
- Location within Iran
- Coordinates: 28°21′04″N 56°24′35″E
- Country: Iran
- Province: Kerman
- County: Arzuiyeh
- Bakhsh: Central
- Rural District: Arzuiyeh

Population (2006)
  - Total: 330
- Time zone: UTC+3:30 (IRST)
  - Summer (DST): UTC+4:30 (IRDT)

Aliabad-e Shamshir Bar (Persian: علي ابادشمشيربر, also romanized as ‘Alīābād-e Shamshīr Bar, Alīābād-e Shamshīr Bor, and ‘Alīābād-e Shamshīr Bor; also known as ‘Alīābād) is a village in Arzuiyeh Rural District, in the.Central District of Arzuiyeh County, Kerman Province, Iran. At the 2006 census its population was 330, in 74 families.
