= Alinabad =

Alinabad عالين اباد
- Village
- Location within Iran
- Coordinates: 33°22′09″N 47°17′32″E
- Country: Iran
- Province: Lorestan
- County: Kuhdasht
- Bakhsh: Kunani
- Rural District: Zirtang

Population (2006)
  - Total: 60
- Time zone: UTC+3:30 (IRST)
  - Summer (DST): UTC+4:30 (IRDT)

Alinabad (Persian: عالين اباد, also Romanized as ‘Ālīnābād; also known as ‘Ālīābād) is a village in Zirtang Rural District, Kunani District, Kuhdasht County, Lorestan Province, Iran. At the 2006 census, its population was 60, in 12 families.
