= Aliabad-e Zinbiyeh =

Aliabad-e Zinbiyeh علی‌آباد زینبیه
- Village
- Country: Iran
- Province: Kerman
- County: Narmashir
- Bakhsh: Central
- Rural District: Posht Rud

Population (2006)
  - Total: 14
- Time zone: UTC+3:30 (IRST)
  - Summer (DST): UTC+4:30 (IRDT)

Aliabad-e Zinbiyeh (Persian: علی‌آباد زینبیه, also Romanized as ‘Alīābād-e Zīnbīyeh) is a village in Posht Rud Rural District, in the Central District of Narmashir County, Kerman Province, Iran. At the 2006 census, its population was 14, in 5 families.
