= Aliabad-e Kukhdan =

Aliabad-e Kukhdan علي ابادكوخدان
- Village
- Location within Iran
- Coordinates: 30°50′15″N 51°28′29″E
- Country: Iran
- Province: Kohgiluyeh and Boyer-Ahmad
- County: Dana
- Bakhsh: Central
- Rural District: Dana

Population (2006)
  - Total: 142
- Time zone: UTC+3:30 (IRST)
  - Summer (DST): UTC+4:30 (IRDT)

Aliabad-e Kukhdan (Persian: علي ابادكوخدان, also Romanized as ‘Alīābād-e Kūkhdān; also known as ‘Alīābād) is a village in Dana Rural District, in the Central District of Dana County, Kohgiluyeh and Boyer-Ahmad Province, Iran. At the 2006 census, its population was 142, in 29 families.
