= Aliabad Jadid =

Aliabad Jadid علي اباد جديد
- Village
- Location within Iran
- Coordinates: 34°01′09″N 47°58′07″E
- Country: Iran
- Province: Lorestan
- County: Delfan
- Bakhsh: Central
- Rural District: Nurali

Population (2006)
  - Total: 20
- Time zone: UTC+3:30 (IRST)
  - Summer (DST): UTC+4:30 (IRDT)

Aliabad Jadid (Persian: علي اباد جديد, also Romanized as ‘Alīābād Jadīd; also known as ‘Alīābād and ‘Alīābād-e Kankabūd) is a village in Nurali Rural District, in the Central District of Delfan County, Lorestan Province, Iran. At the 2006 census, its population was 20, in 5 families.
