= Aliabad, Chaypareh =

Aliabad علی‌آباد
- Village
- Location within Iran
- Coordinates: 38°49′54″N 44°58′02″E
- Country: Iran
- Province: West Azerbaijan
- County: Chaypareh
- Bakhsh: Central
- Rural District: Churs

Population (2006)
  - Total: 56
- Time zone: UTC+3:30 (IRST)
  - Summer (DST): UTC+4:30 (IRDT)

Aliabad (Persian: علی‌آباد, also Romanized as ‘Alīābād; also known as ‘Alī Ābād) is a village in Churs Rural District, in the Central District of Chaypareh County, West Azerbaijan Province, Iran. At the 2006 census, its population was 56, in 11 families.
