= Aliabad-e Band =

Aliabad-e Band علي ابادبند
- Village
- Location within Iran
- Coordinates: 35°07′56″N 50°26′23″E
- Country: Iran
- Province: Markazi
- County: Saveh
- Bakhsh: Central
- Rural District: Nur Ali Beyk

Population (2006)
  - Total: 13
- Time zone: UTC+3:30 (IRST)
  - Summer (DST): UTC+4:30 (IRDT)

Aliabad-e Band (Persian: علي ابادبند, also Romanized as Alīābād-e Band; also known as ‘Alīābād) is a village in Nur Ali Beyk Rural District, in the Central District of Saveh County, Markazi Province, Iran. At the 2006 census, its population was 13, in 4 families.
