= Aliabad-e Moftabad =

Aliabad-e Moftabad علي ابادمفت اباد
- Village
- Location within Iran
- Coordinates: 30°25′33″N 56°04′47″E
- Country: Iran
- Province: Kerman
- County: Rafsanjan
- Bakhsh: Central
- Rural District: Qasemabad

Population (2006)
  - Total: 252
- Time zone: UTC+3:30 (IRST)
  - Summer (DST): UTC+4:30 (IRDT)

Aliabad-e Moftabad (Persian: علي ابادمفت اباد, also Romanized as ‘Alīābād-e Moftābād; also known as Moftābād) is a village in Qasemabad Rural District, in the Central District of Rafsanjan County, Kerman Province, Iran. At the 2006 census, its population was 252, in 64 families.
