= Aliabad, Qarah Bagh =

Aliabad علی آباد
- Village
- Location within Iran
- Coordinates: 29°29′35″N 52°35′17″E
- Country: Iran
- Province: Fars
- County: Shiraz
- Bakhsh: Central
- Rural District: Qarah Bagh

Population (2006)
  - Total: 895
- Time zone: UTC+3:30 (IRST)
  - Summer (DST): UTC+4:30 (IRDT)

Aliabad (Persian: علی‌آباد, also Romanized as 'Alīābād and Alīābād) is a village in Qarah Bagh Rural District, in the Central District of Shiraz County, Fars province, Iran. At the 2006 census, its population was 895, in 224 families.
