= Aliabad, Pasargad =

Aliabad علی‌آباد
- Village
- Location within Iran
- Coordinates: 29°58′07″N 53°24′18″E
- Country: Iran
- Province: Fars
- County: Pasargad
- Bakhsh: Central
- Rural District: Sarpaniran

Population (2006)
  - Total: 86
- Time zone: UTC+3:30 (IRST)
  - Summer (DST): UTC+4:30 (IRDT)

Aliabad (Persian: علی‌آباد, also Romanized as 'Alīābād) is a village in Sarpaniran Rural District, in the Central District of Pasargad County, Fars province, Iran. At the 2006 census, its population was 86, in 27 families.
