= Aliabad, Larestan =

Aliabad علي اباد
- Village
- Location within Iran
- Coordinates: 27°41′08″N 54°41′43″E
- Country: Iran
- Province: Fars
- County: Larestan
- Bakhsh: Central
- Rural District: Howmeh
- Established: 1890

Population (2006)
  - Total: 1,321
- Time zone: UTC+3:30 (IRST)
  - Summer (DST): UTC+4:30 (IRDT)

Aliabad (Persian: علي اباد, also Romanized as 'Alīābād) is a village in Howmeh Rural District, in the Central District of Larestan County, Fars province, Iran. At the 2006 census, its population was 1,321, in 262 families.
