= Aliabad, Najafabad, Bijar =

Aliabad علی‌آباد
- Village
- Location within Iran
- Coordinates: 35°44′57″N 47°20′43″E
- Country: Iran
- Province: Kurdistan
- County: Bijar
- Bakhsh: Central
- Rural District: Najafabad

Population (2006)
  - Total: 134
- Time zone: UTC+3:30 (IRST)
  - Summer (DST): UTC+4:30 (IRDT)

Aliabad (Persian: علی‌آباد, also Romanized as 'Alīābād) is a village in Najafabad Rural District, in the Central District of Bijar County, Kurdistan province, Iran. At the 2006 census, its population was 134, in 30 families. The village is populated by Kurds.
