= Aliabad, Divandarreh =

Aliabad علي آباد
- Village
- Location within Iran
- Coordinates: 35°56′53″N 46°51′03″E
- Country: Iran
- Province: Kurdistan
- County: Divandarreh
- Bakhsh: Central
- Rural District: Chehel Cheshmeh

Population (2006)
  - Total: 404
- Time zone: UTC+3:30 (IRST)
  - Summer (DST): UTC+4:30 (IRDT)

Aliabad (Persian: علي آباد, also Romanized as ‘Alīābād) is a village in Chehel Cheshmeh Rural District, in the Central District of Divandarreh County, Kurdistan Province, Iran. At the 2006 census, its population was 404, in 78 families. The village is populated by Kurds.
