= Aliabad-e Rugushuiyeh =

Aliabad-e Rugushuiyeh علي ابادروگوشوئيه
- Village
- Country: Iran
- Province: Kerman
- County: Shahr-e Babak
- Bakhsh: Dehaj
- Rural District: Jowzam

Population (2006)
  - Total: 26
- Time zone: UTC+3:30 (IRST)
  - Summer (DST): UTC+4:30 (IRDT)

Aliabad-e Rugushuiyeh (Persian: علي ابادروگوشوئيه, also Romanized as ʿAlīābād-e Rūgūshū’īyeh) is a village in Jowzam Rural District, Dehaj District, Shahr-e Babak County, Kerman Province, Iran. At the 2006 census, its population was 26, in 6 families.
