= Aliabad-e Takht-e Khvajeh =

Aliabad-e Takht-e Khvajeh علي ابادتختخواجه /تخت خواجه پائين /
- Village
- Location within Iran
- Coordinates: 28°23′28″N 56°27′09″E
- Country: Iran
- Province: Kerman
- County: Arzuiyeh
- Bakhsh: Central
- Rural District: Arzuiyeh

Population (2006)
  - Total: 420
- Time zone: UTC+3:30 (IRST)
  - Summer (DST): UTC+4:30 (IRDT)

Aliabad-e Takht-e Khvajeh (Persian: علی‌آباد تخت‌خواجه, also Romanized as ‘Alīābād-e Takht-e Khvājeh; also known as Takht-e Khvājeh-ye Pā’īn (تخت‌خواجهٔ پایین), Allāhābād (الله‌آباد), and Allāhābād-e Takht-e Khvājeh (الله‌آباد تخت‌خواجه) is a village in Arzuiyeh Rural District, in the Central District of Arzuiyeh County, Kerman Province, Iran. At the 2006 census, its population was 420, in 99 families.
