= Aliabad-e Jainag =

Village in Bushehr, Iran

Aliabad-e Jainag علی‌آباد جایینگ
- Village
- Location within Iran
- Coordinates: 28°47′23″N 51°03′19″E
- Country: Iran
- Province: Bushehr
- County: Tangestan
- Bakhsh: Delvar
- Rural District: Delvar

Population (2006)
  - Total: 641
- Time zone: UTC+3:30 (IRST)
  - Summer (DST): UTC+4:30 (IRDT)

Aliabad-e Jainag (Persian: علی‌آباد جایینگ, also Romanized as ‘Alīābād-e Jā'īnag; also known as ‘Alīābād) is a village in Delvar Rural District, Delvar District, Tangestan County, Bushehr Province, Iran. At the 2006 census, its population was 641, in 151 families.
