= Aliabad-e Kalkhuni =

Aliabad-e Kalkhuni علي ابادكال خوني
- village
- Location within Iran
- Coordinates: 36°09′09″N 58°02′10″E
- Country: Iran
- Province: Razavi Khorasan
- County: Sabzevar
- Bakhsh: Central
- Rural District: Robat

Population (2006)
  - Total: 91
- Time zone: UTC+3:30 (IRST)
  - Summer (DST): UTC+4:30 (IRDT)
- ISO 3166 code: IRN

Aliabad-e Kalkhuni (Persian: علي ابادكال خوني, also Romanized as ‘Alīābād-e Kālkhūnī) is a village in Robat Rural District, in the Central District of Sabzevar County, Razavi Khorasan Province, Iran. At the 2006 census, its population was 91, in 21 families.

== See also ==
- List of cities, towns and villages in Razavi Khorasan Province
