= Aliabad-e Ayvora =

Aliabad-e Ayvora علي ابادايوراع
- Village
- Location within Iran
- Coordinates: 34°49′49″N 48°00′35″E
- Country: Iran
- Province: Hamadan
- County: Asadabad
- Bakhsh: Central
- Rural District: Chaharduli

Population (2006)
  - Total: 354
- Time zone: UTC+3:30 (IRST)
  - Summer (DST): UTC+4:30 (IRDT)

Aliabad-e Ayvora (Persian: علي ابادايوراع, also Romanized as ‘Alīābād-e Ayvorā; also known as ‘Alīābād) is a village in Chaharduli Rural District, in the Central District of Asadabad County, Hamadan Province, Iran. At the 2006 census, its population was 354, in 73 families.
