= Aliabad-e Shahid, Razavi Khorasan =

Aliabad-e Shahid علي اباد شهيد
- Village
- Location within Iran
- Coordinates: 36°06′22″N 58°52′33″E
- Country: Iran
- Province: Razavi Khorasan
- County: Nishapur
- Bakhsh: Central
- Rural District: Darbqazi

Population (2006)
  - Total: 145
- Time zone: UTC+3:30 (IRST)
  - Summer (DST): UTC+4:30 (IRDT)

Aliabad-e Shahid (Persian: علي اباد شهيد, also Romanized as ‘Alīābād-e Shahīd; also known as ‘Alīābād) is a village in Darbqazi Rural District, in the Central District of Nishapur County, Razavi Khorasan Province, Iran. At the 2006 census, its population was 145, in 45 families.

== See also ==
- List of cities, towns and villages in Razavi Khorasan Province
