= Aliabad, Lamerd =

Aliabad عالي اباد
- Village
- Location within Iran
- Coordinates: 27°15′44″N 53°21′26″E
- Country: Iran
- Province: Fars
- County: Lamerd
- Bakhsh: Central
- Rural District: Sigar

Population (2006)
  - Total: 376
- Time zone: UTC+3:30 (IRST)
  - Summer (DST): UTC+4:30 (IRDT)

Aliabad (Persian: عالي اباد, also Romanized as 'Alīābād and 'Ālīābād) is a village in Sigar Rural District, in the Central District of Lamerd County, Fars province, Iran. At the 2006 census, its population was 376, in 85 families.
