= Aliabad, Sonqor =

Village in Kermanshah Province, Iran

Aliabad علي اباد
- Village
- Location within Iran
- Coordinates: 34°47′24″N 47°20′22″E
- Country: Iran
- Province: Kermanshah
- County: Sonqor
- Bakhsh: Kolyai
- Rural District: Satar

Population (2006)
  - Total: 110
- Time zone: UTC+3:30 (IRST)
  - Summer (DST): UTC+4:30 (IRDT)

Aliabad (Persian: علي اباد, also Romanized as ‘Alīābād) is a village in Satar Rural District, Kolyai District, Sonqor County, Kermanshah Province, Iran. At the 2006 census, its population was 110, in 24 families.
