= Aliabad, Kelachay =

Aliabad علي آباد
- Village
- Location within Iran
- Coordinates: 37°02′04″N 50°25′18″E
- Country: Iran
- Province: Gilan
- County: Rudsar
- Bakhsh: Kelachay
- Rural District: Bibalan

Population (2006)
  - Total: 324
- Time zone: UTC+3:30 (IRST)
  - Summer (DST): UTC+4:30 (IRDT)

Aliabad (Persian: علي آباد, also Romanized as ‘Alīābād) is a village in Bibalan Rural District, Kelachay District, Rudsar County, Gilan Province, Iran. At the 2006 census, its population was 324, in 83 families.
