= Aliabad, Babol =

Aliabad علی‌آباد
- Village
- Location within Iran
- Coordinates: 36°36′50″N 52°53′42″E
- Country: Iran
- Province: Mazandaran
- County: Babol
- Bakhsh: Lalehabad
- Rural District: Karipey

Population (2006)
  - Total: 455
- Time zone: UTC+3:30 (IRST)
  - Summer (DST): UTC+4:30 (IRDT)

Aliabad (Persian: علی‌آباد, also Romanized as ‘Alīābād) is a village in Karipey Rural District, Lalehabad District, Babol County, Mazandaran Province, Iran. At the 2006 census, its population was 455, in 116 families.
