= Aliabad Molla Alireza =

Aliabad Molla Alireza علي ابادملاعليرضا
- Village
- Location within Iran
- Coordinates: 32°00′10″N 55°57′11″E
- Country: Iran
- Province: Yazd
- County: Behabad
- Bakhsh: Central
- Rural District: Jolgeh

Population (2006)
  - Total: 255
- Time zone: UTC+3:30 (IRST)
  - Summer (DST): UTC+4:30 (IRDT)

Aliabad Molla Alireza (Persian: علي ابادملاعليرضا, also Romanized as ‘Alīābād Mollā ‘Alīreẕā) is a village in Jolgeh Rural District, in the Central District of Behabad County, Yazd Province, Iran. At the 2006 census, its population was 255, in 61 families.
