= Aliabad-e Bar Aftab =

Aliabad-e Bar Aftab علي آباد برآفتاب
- Village
- Location within Iran
- Coordinates: 33°51′51″N 47°59′27″E
- Country: Iran
- Province: Lorestan
- County: Selseleh
- Bakhsh: Firuzabad
- Rural District: Qalayi

Population (2006)
  - Total: 40
- Time zone: UTC+3:30 (IRST)
  - Summer (DST): UTC+4:30 (IRDT)

Aliabad-e Bar Aftab (Persian: علي آباد برآفتاب, also Romanized as ‘Alīābād-e Bar Āftāb; also known as ‘Alīābād-e Mīrākhūr and ‘Alīābād) is a village in Qalayi Rural District, Firuzabad District, Selseleh County, Lorestan Province, Iran. At the 2006 census, its population was 40, in 8 families.
