= Aliabad, Tarom Sofla =

Aliabad علي اباد
- Village
- Location within Iran
- Coordinates: 36°26′25″N 49°10′39″E
- Country: Iran
- Province: Qazvin
- County: Qazvin
- Bakhsh: Tarom Sofla
- Rural District: Chuqur

Population (2006)
  - Total: 147
- Time zone: UTC+3:30 (IRST)
  - Summer (DST): UTC+4:30 (IRDT)

Aliabad (Persian: علي اباد, also Romanized as ‘Alīābād) is a village in Chuqur Rural District, Tarom Sofla District, Qazvin County, Qazvin Province, Iran. At the 2006 census, its population was 147, in 32 families.
