= Aliabad, Kalatrazan =

Aliabad علي آباد
- Village
- Location within Iran
- Coordinates: 35°24′20″N 46°44′05″E
- Country: Iran
- Province: Kurdistan
- County: Sanandaj
- Bakhsh: Kalatrazan
- Rural District: Kalatrazan

Population (2006)
  - Total: 697
- Time zone: UTC+3:30 (IRST)
  - Summer (DST): UTC+4:30 (IRDT)

Aliabad (Persian: علي آباد, also Romanized as ‘Alīābād) is a village in Kalatrazan Rural District, Kalatrazan District, Sanandaj County, Kurdistan Province, Iran. At the 2006 census, its population was 697, in 146 families. The village is populated by Kurds.
