= Aliabad, Shirez =

Aliabad علي اباد
- Village
- Location within Iran
- Coordinates: 34°23′01″N 47°31′40″E
- Country: Iran
- Province: Kermanshah
- County: Harsin
- Bakhsh: Bisotun
- Rural District: Shirez

Population (2006)
  - Total: 154
- Time zone: UTC+3:30 (IRST)
  - Summer (DST): UTC+4:30 (IRDT)

Aliabad (Persian: علي اباد, also romanized as ‘Alīābād) is a village in Shirez Rural District, Bisotun District, Harsin County, Kermanshah Province, Iran. At the 2006 census, its population was 154, spread among 38 families.
