= Aliabad, Tolbozan =

Aliabad علي اباد
- Village
- Location within Iran
- Coordinates: 31°55′45″N 49°22′32″E
- Country: Iran
- Province: Khuzestan
- County: Masjed Soleyman
- Bakhsh: Golgir
- Rural District: Tolbozan

Population (2006)
  - Total: 121
- Time zone: UTC+3:30 (IRST)
  - Summer (DST): UTC+4:30 (IRDT)

Aliabad (Persian: علي اباد, also Romanized as ‘Alīābād; also known as ‘Alīābād-e Tal Bozān and Ali Abad Toobazan) is a village in Tolbozan Rural District, Golgir District, Masjed Soleyman County, Khuzestan Province, Iran. At the 2006 census, its population was 121, in 23 families.
