= Aliabad-e Ziaabad =

Coordinates: 28°57′N 58°44′E

Aliabad-e Ziaabad علي ابادضيااباد
- Village
- Interactive map of Aliabad-e Ziaabad
- Country: Iran
- Province: Kerman
- County: Narmashir
- Bakhsh: Central
- Rural District: Posht Rud

Population (2006)
  - Total: 514
- Time zone: UTC+3:30 (IRST)
  - Summer (DST): UTC+4:30 (IRDT)

Aliabad-e Ziaabad (Persian: علي ابادضيااباد, also Romanized as ‘Alīābād-e Ẕīāābād) is a village in Posht Rud Rural District, in the Central District of Narmashir County, Kerman Province, Iran. At the 2006 census, its population was 514, in 113 families.
