= Aliabad-e Darreh Dur =

Aliabad-e Darreh Dur علي اباددره دور
- Village
- Location within Iran
- Coordinates: 30°25′39″N 56°04′40″E
- Country: Iran
- Province: Kerman
- County: Rafsanjan
- Bakhsh: Central
- Rural District: Darreh Doran

Population (2006)
  - Total: 45
- Time zone: UTC+3:30 (IRST)
  - Summer (DST): UTC+4:30 (IRDT)

Aliabad-e Darreh Dur (Persian: علي اباددره دور, also Romanized as ‘Alīābād-e Darreh Dūr; also known as ‘Alīābād and ‘Alīābād-e Khān) is a village in Darreh Doran Rural District, in the Central District of Rafsanjan County, Kerman Province, Iran. At the 2006 census, its population was 45, in 12 families.
