= Aliabad-e Vali Shahanvazi =

Aliabad-e Vali Shahanvazi علي ابادولي شهنوازي
- Village
- Location within Iran
- Coordinates: 28°51′25″N 59°01′36″E
- Country: Iran
- Province: Kerman
- County: Fahraj
- Bakhsh: Negin Kavir
- Rural District: Chahdegal

Population (2006)
  - Total: 536
- Time zone: UTC+3:30 (IRST)
  - Summer (DST): UTC+4:30 (IRDT)

Aliabad-e Vali Shahanvazi (Persian: علي ابادولي شهنوازي, also Romanized as ‘Alīābād-e Valī Shahanvāzī) is a village in Chahdegal Rural District, Negin Kavir District, Fahraj County, Kerman Province, Iran. At the 2006 census, the village's population was 536 and 118 families.
