= Ali Va =

Ali Va علی وا
- Village
- Location within Iran
- Coordinates: 36°47′42″N 49°54′58″E
- Country: Iran
- Province: Gilan
- County: Siahkal
- Bakhsh: Deylaman
- Rural District: Deylaman

Population (2006)
  - Total: 115
- Time zone: UTC+3:30 (IRST)

Ali Va (Persian: علی وا, also Romanized as ‘Alī Vā; also known as ‘Alīābād and ‘Alī Veh) is a village in Deylaman Rural District, Deylaman District, Siahkal County, Gilan Province, Iran. At the 2016 census, its population was 25, in 8 families. Decreased from 115 people in 2006.
