= Aliabad-e Qarchi =

Aliabad-e Qarchi علي ابادقرچي
- Village
- Location within Iran
- Coordinates: 29°44′21″N 52°18′05″E
- Country: Iran
- Province: Fars
- County: Shiraz
- Bakhsh: Arzhan
- Rural District: Qarah Chaman

Population (2006)
  - Total: 101
- Time zone: UTC+3:30 (IRST)
  - Summer (DST): UTC+4:30 (IRDT)

Aliabad-e Qarchi (Persian: علي ابادقرچي, also romanized as 'Alīābād-e Qarchī; also known as 'Alīābād-e Qarcheh) is a village in Qarah Chaman Rural District, Arzhan District, Shiraz County, Fars province, Iran. At the 2006 census, its population was 101, in 28 families.
