= Aliabad-e Luch =

Aliabad-e Luch علي آباد لوچ
- Village
- Location within Iran
- Coordinates: 35°23′11″N 47°30′13″E
- Country: Iran
- Province: Kurdistan
- County: Dehgolan
- Bakhsh: Central
- Rural District: Yeylan-e Shomali

Population (2006)
  - Total: 236
- Time zone: UTC+3:30 (IRST)
  - Summer (DST): UTC+4:30 (IRDT)

Aliabad-e Luch (Persian: علي آباد لوچ, also Romanized as ‘Alīābād-e Lūch; also known as ‘Alīābād) is a village in Yeylan-e Shomali Rural District, in the Central District of Dehgolan County, Kurdistan Province, Iran. At the 2006 census, its population was 236, in 57 families. The village is populated by Kurds.
