= Aliabad-e Faqih Mahalleh =

Aliabad-e Faqih Mahalleh علی‌آباد فقيه محله
- village
- Location within Iran
- Coordinates: 36°49′06″N 50°48′58″E
- Country: Iran
- Province: Mazandaran
- County: Tonekabon
- Bakhsh: Central
- Rural District: Goli Jan

Population (2006)
  - Total: 133
- Time zone: UTC+3:30 (IRST)
  - Summer (DST): UTC+4:30 (IRDT)

Aliabad-e Faqih Mahalleh (Persian: علی‌آباد فقيه محله, also Romanized as ‘Alīābād-e Faqīh Maḩalleh; also known as ‘Alīābād) is a village in Goli Jan Rural District, in the Central District of Tonekabon County, Mazandaran Province, Iran. At the 2006 census, its population was 133, in 41 families.
