= Aliabad-e Alu =

Aliabad-e Alu علي ابادالو
- Village
- Location within Iran
- Coordinates: 36°47′15″N 57°37′42″E
- Country: Iran
- Province: North Khorasan
- County: Esfarayen
- Bakhsh: Central
- Rural District: Azari

Population (2006)
  - Total: 153
- Time zone: UTC+3:30 (IRST)
  - Summer (DST): UTC+4:30 (IRDT)

Aliabad-e Alu (Persian: علي ابادالو, also Romanized as ‘Alīābād-e Ālū; also known as Kalāteh-ye ‘Alī Ālū and Kalāteh-ye ‘Alī Āllū) is a village in Azari Rural District, in the Central District of Esfarayen County, North Khorasan Province, Iran. At the 2006 census, its population was 153, in 43 families.
