= Aliabad, Margha =

Aliabad علي اباد
- Village
- Location within Iran
- Coordinates: 31°57′22″N 49°34′12″E
- Country: Iran
- Province: Khuzestan
- County: Izeh
- Bakhsh: Central
- Rural District: Margha

Population (2006)
  - Total: 51
- Time zone: UTC+3:30 (IRST)
  - Summer (DST): UTC+4:30 (IRDT)

Aliabad (Persian: علي اباد, also Romanized as ‘Alīābād) is a village in Margha Rural District, in the Central District of Izeh County, Khuzestan Province, Iran. At the 2006 census, its population was 51, in 8 families.
