= Aliabad-e Kohneh =

Aliabad-e Kohneh علي آبادكهنه
- Village
- Location within Iran
- Coordinates: 34°47′05″N 46°28′36″E
- Country: Iran
- Province: Kermanshah
- County: Javanrud
- Bakhsh: Central
- Rural District: Palanganeh

Population (2006)
  - Total: 150
- Time zone: UTC+3:30 (IRST)
  - Summer (DST): UTC+4:30 (IRDT)

Aliabad-e Kohneh (Persian: علي آبادكهنه, Sorani Kurdish: عەلی ئاوای کۆنە، also Romanized as ‘Alīābād-e Kohneh) is a village in Palanganeh Rural District, in the Central District of Javanrud County, Kermanshah Province, Iran. At the 2006 census, its population was 150, in 35 families.
