= Aliabad Sara =

Aliabad Sara علي ابادسرا
- Village
- Location within Iran
- Coordinates: 37°05′06″N 50°08′30″E
- Country: Iran
- Province: Gilan
- County: Langarud
- Bakhsh: Otaqvar
- Rural District: Lat Leyl

Population (2006)
  - Total: 93
- Time zone: UTC+3:30 (IRST)
  - Summer (DST): UTC+4:30 (IRDT)

Aliabad Sara (Persian: علي ابادسرا, also Romanized as ‘Alīābād Sarā) is a village in Lat Leyl Rural District, Otaqvar District, Langarud County, Gilan Province, Iran. At the 2006 census, its population was 93, in 25 families.
