= Aliabad-e Abgarm =

Aliabad-e Abgarm علي ابادابگرم
- Village
- Location within Iran
- Coordinates: 30°03′19″N 52°03′35″E
- Country: Iran
- Province: Fars
- County: Sepidan
- Bakhsh: Hamaijan
- Rural District: Hamaijan

Population (2006)
  - Total: 105
- Time zone: UTC+3:30 (IRST)
  - Summer (DST): UTC+4:30 (IRDT)

Aliabad-e Abgarm (Persian: علي ابادابگرم, also romanized as 'Alīābād-e Ābgarm; also known as 'Alīābād) is a village in Hamaijan Rural District, Hamaijan District, Sepidan County, Fars province, Iran. At the 2006 census, its population was 105, in 31 families.
