= Aliabad-e Robat =

Aliabad-e Robat علي ابادرباط
- Village
- Location within Iran
- Coordinates: 30°11′00″N 56°45′00″E
- Country: Iran
- Province: Kerman
- County: Kerman
- Bakhsh: Central
- Rural District: Baghin

Population (2006)
  - Total: 24
- Time zone: UTC+3:30 (IRST)
  - Summer (DST): UTC+4:30 (IRDT)

Aliabad-e Robat (Persian: علي ابادرباط, also Romanized as ‘Alīābād-e Robāṭ; also known as ‘Alīābād) is a village in Baghin Rural District, in the Central District of Kerman County, Kerman Province, Iran. At the 2006 census, its population was 24, in 4 families.
