= Aliabad-e Mokhtar =

Aliabad-e Mokhtar علي ابادمختار
- Village
- Location within Iran
- Coordinates: 30°38′26″N 51°34′05″E
- Country: Iran
- Province: Kohgiluyeh and Boyer-Ahmad
- County: Boyer-Ahmad
- Bakhsh: Central
- Rural District: Sarrud-e Jonubi

Population (2006)
  - Total: 80
- Time zone: UTC+3:30 (IRST)
  - Summer (DST): UTC+4:30 (IRDT)

Aliabad-e Mokhtar (Persian: علي ابادمختار, also Romanized as ‘Alīābād-e Mokhtār; also known as ‘Alīābād) is a village in Sarrud-e Jonubi Rural District, in the Central District of Boyer-Ahmad County, Kohgiluyeh and Boyer-Ahmad Province, Iran. At the 2006 census, its population was 80, in 15 families.
