= Aliabad, Nishapur =

Aliabad علي اباد
- Village
- Location within Iran
- Coordinates: 36°34′48″N 58°31′00″E
- Country: Iran
- Province: Razavi Khorasan
- County: Nishapur
- Bakhsh: Central
- Rural District: Binalud

Population (2006)
  - Total: 87
- Time zone: UTC+3:30 (IRST)
  - Summer (DST): UTC+4:30 (IRDT)

Aliabad (Persian: علي اباد, also Romanized as ‘Alīābād) is a village in Binalud Rural District, in the Central District of Nishapur County, Razavi Khorasan Province, Iran. At the 2006 census, its population was 87, in 18 families.

== See also ==
- List of cities, towns and villages in Razavi Khorasan Province
