= Aliabad-e Jahr =

Aliabad-e Jahr علي ابادجهر
- Village
- Location within Iran
- Coordinates: 30°26′58″N 56°53′55″E
- Country: Iran
- Province: Kerman
- County: Kerman
- Bakhsh: Central
- Rural District: Zangiabad

Population (2006)
  - Total: 44
- Time zone: UTC+3:30 (IRST)
  - Summer (DST): UTC+4:30 (IRDT)

Aliabad-e Jahr (Persian: علي ابادجهر, also Romanized as ’Alīābād-e Jahr; also known as ‘Alīābād-e Jar) is a village in Zangiabad Rural District, in the Central District of Kerman County, Kerman Province, Iran. At the 2006 census, its population was 44, in 6 families.
