= Aliabad-e Tadayyon =

Aliabad-e Tadayyon علي ابادتدين
- Village
- Location within Iran
- Coordinates: 28°56′09″N 58°47′18″E
- Country: Iran
- Province: Kerman
- County: Narmashir
- Bakhsh: Central
- Rural District: Azizabad

Population (2006)
  - Total: 1,409
- Time zone: UTC+3:30 (IRST)
  - Summer (DST): UTC+4:30 (IRDT)

Aliabad-e Tadayyon (Persian: علي ابادتدين, also Romanized as ‘Alīābād-e Tadayyon) is a village in Azizabad Rural District, in the Central District of Narmashir County, Kerman Province, Iran. At the 2006 census, its population was 1,409, in 311 families.
