= Aliabad-e Duleh Rash =

Aliabad-e Duleh Rash علي آباد دوله رش
- Village
- Location within Iran
- Coordinates: 35°38′21″N 46°49′35″E
- Country: Iran
- Province: Kurdistan
- County: Divandarreh
- Bakhsh: Saral
- Rural District: Saral

Population (2006)
  - Total: 118
- Time zone: UTC+3:30 (IRST)
  - Summer (DST): UTC+4:30 (IRDT)

Aliabad-e Duleh Rash (Persian: علي آباد دوله رش, also Romanized as ‘Alīābād-e Dūleh Rash; also known as ‘Alīābād) is a village in Saral Rural District, Saral District, Divandarreh County, Kurdistan Province, Iran. At the 2006 census, its population was 118, in 23 families. The village is populated by Kurds.
