= Aliabad-e Qadim =

Aliabad علي اباد
- Village
- Location within Iran
- Coordinates: 28°52′20″N 55°00′14″E
- Country: Iran
- Province: Fars
- County: Neyriz
- Bakhsh: Qatruyeh
- Rural District: Rizab

Population (2006)
  - Total: 51
- Time zone: UTC+3:30 (IRST)
  - Summer (DST): UTC+4:30 (IRDT)

Aliabad (Persian: علي اباد, also Romanized as 'Alīābād; also known as 'Alīābād-e Qadim) is a village in Rizab Rural District, Qatruyeh District, Neyriz County, Fars province, Iran. At the 2006 census, its population was 51, in 14 families.
