= Shah Rah =

Shah Rah شاهراه
- Village
- Location within Iran
- Coordinates: 36°29′18″N 59°26′29″E
- Country: Iran
- Province: Razavi Khorasan
- County: Mashhad
- Bakhsh: Central
- Rural District: Miyan Velayat

Population (2006)
  - Total: 265
- Time zone: UTC+3:30 (IRST)
  - Summer (DST): UTC+4:30 (IRDT)

Shah Rah (Persian: شاهراه, also Romanized as Shāh Rāh and Shāhrāh; also known as ‘Alīābād-e Emām) is a village in Miyan Velayat Rural District, in the Central District of Mashhad County, Razavi Khorasan Province, Iran. At the 2006 census, its population was 265, in 65 families.
