= Rud Barak, Tehran =

Rud Barak رودبارک
- Village
- Location within Iran
- Coordinates: 35°21′32″N 51°39′37″E
- Country: Iran
- Province: Tehran
- County: Pishva
- Bakhsh: Central
- Rural District: Asgariyeh

Population (2016)
  - Total: 267
- Time zone: UTC+3:30 (IRST)

Rud Barak (Persian: رودبارک, also romanized as Rūd Bārak and Rūd-e Bārak) is a village in Asgariyeh Rural District, in the Central District of Pishva County, Tehran Province, Iran.

At the time of the 2006 National Census, the village's population was 324 in 74 households, when it was in the former Pishva District of Varamin County. The following census in 2011 counted 94 people in 24 households, by which time the district had been separated from the county in the establishment of Pishva County. The rural district was transferred to the new Central District. The 2016 census measured the population of the village as 267 people in 85 households
