= Qaleh Sin =

Village in Tehran province, Iran

Qaleh Sin Persian: قلعه سين
- Village
- Location within Iran
- Coordinates: 35°18′32″N 51°40′50″E
- Country: Iran
- Province: Tehran
- County: Pishva
- District: Central
- Rural District: Pishva
- Elevation: 916 m (3,005 ft)

Population (2016)
  - Total: 2,892
- Time zone: UTC+3:30 (IRST)

Qaleh Sin (Persian: قلعه سين) (Note: Also romanized as Qal‘eh Sīn) is a village in, and the capital of, Pishva Rural District in the Central District of Pishva County, Tehran province, Iran.

== Demographics ==
=== Population ===
At the time of the 2006 National Census, the village's population was 2,083 in 506 households, when it was in Asgariyeh Rural District of the former Pishva District in Varamin County. The following census in 2011 counted 2,122 people in 561 households, by which time the district had been separated from the county in the establishment of Pishva County. The rural district was transferred to the new Central District, and Qaleh Sin was transferred to Pishva Rural District created in the same district. The 2016 census measured the population of the village as 2,892 people in 811 households. It was the most populous village in its rural district.
