= Shushabad =

Village in Tehran province, Iran

Shushabad Persian: شوش اباد
- Village
- Location within Iran
- Coordinates: 35°21′51″N 51°44′03″E
- Country: Iran
- Province: Tehran
- County: Pishva
- District: Jalilabad
- Rural District: Tarand-e Bala

Population (2016)
  - Total: 730
- Time zone: UTC+3:30 (IRST)

Shushabad (Persian: شوش اباد) (Note: Also romanized as Shūshābād; also known as Sūshābād) is a village in Tarand-e Bala Rural District of Jalilabad District in Pishva County, Tehran province, Iran.

== Demographics ==
=== Population ===
At the time of the 2006 National Census, the village's population was 1,037 in 223 households, when it was in Behnamsokhteh-e Jonubi Rural District (Note: Renamed Jalilabad Rural District) of the former Pishva District in Varamin County. The following census in 2011 counted 971 people in 241 households, by which time the district had been separated from the county in the establishment of Pishva County. The rural district was transferred to the new Jalilabad District and renamed Jalilabad Rural District. Shushabad was transferred to Tarand-e Bala Rural District created in the same district. The 2016 census measured the population of the village as 730 people in 190 households.
