= Yam, Tehran =

Village in Tehran province, Iran

Yam Persian: يام
- Village
- Location within Iran
- Coordinates: 35°21′32″N 51°47′12″E
- Country: Iran
- Province: Tehran
- County: Pishva
- District: Jalilabad
- Rural District: Tarand-e Bala

Population (2016)
  - Total: 423
- Time zone: UTC+3:30 (IRST)

Yam (Persian: يام) (Note: Also romanized as Yām) is a village in Tarand-e Bala Rural District of Jalilabad District in Pishva County, Tehran province, Iran.

== Demographics ==
=== Population ===
At the time of the 2006 National Census, the village's population was 346 in 92 households, when it was in Behnamsokhteh-e Jonubi Rural District (Note: Renamed Jalilabad Rural District) of the former Pishva District in Varamin County. The following census in 2011 counted 446 people in 123 households, by which time the district had been separated from the county in the establishment of Pishva County. The rural district was transferred to the new Jalilabad District and renamed Jalilabad Rural District. Yam was transferred to Tarand-e Bala Rural District created in the same district. The 2016 census measured the population of the village as 423 people in 130 households.
