= Moinabad, Tehran =

Village in Tehran province, Iran

Moinabad Persian: معين اباد
- Village
- Location within Iran
- Coordinates: 35°16′57″N 51°40′28″E
- Country: Iran
- Province: Tehran
- County: Pishva
- District: Central
- Rural District: Pishva
- Elevation: 895 m (2,936 ft)

Population (2016)
  - Total: 561
- Time zone: UTC+3:30 (IRST)

Moinabad (Persian: معين اباد) (Note: Also romanized as Mo‘īnābād) is a village in Pishva Rural District of the Central District in Pishva County, Tehran province, Iran.

== Demographics ==
=== Population ===
At the time of the 2006 National Census, the village's population was 657 in 158 households, when it was in Asgariyeh Rural District of the former Pishva District in Varamin County. The following census in 2011 counted 684 people in 183 households, by which time the district had been separated from the county in the establishment of Pishva County. The rural district was transferred to the new Central District, and Moinabad was transferred to Pishva Rural District created in the same district. The 2016 census measured the population of the village as 561 people in 150 households.
