= Fathabad, Pishva =

Village in Tehran province, Iran

Fathabad Persian: فتح اباد
- Village
- Location within Iran
- Coordinates: 35°17′14″N 51°42′33″E
- Country: Iran
- Province: Tehran
- County: Pishva
- District: Central
- Rural District: Pishva

Population (2016)
  - Total: 17
- Time zone: UTC+3:30 (IRST)

Fathabad (Persian: فتح اباد) (Note: Also romanized as Fatḩābād) is a village in Pishva Rural District of the Central District in Pishva County, Tehran province, Iran.

== Demographics ==
=== Population ===
At the time of the 2006 National Census, the village's population was 23 in seven households, when it was in Asgariyeh Rural District of the former Pishva District in Varamin County. The following census in 2011 counted 34 people in 11 households, by which time the district had been separated from the county in the establishment of Pishva County. The rural district was transferred to the new Central District, and Fathabad was transferred to Pishva Rural District created in the same district. The 2016 census measured the population of the village as 17 people in five households.
