= Quinak-e Rakhshani =

Village in Tehran province, Iran

Quinak-e Rakhshani Persian: قوئينك رخشاني
- Village
- Location within Iran
- Coordinates: 35°22′01″N 51°44′49″E
- Country: Iran
- Province: Tehran
- County: Pishva
- District: Jalilabad
- Rural District: Tarand-e Bala
- Elevation: 978 m (3,209 ft)

Population (2016)
  - Total: 324
- Time zone: UTC+3:30 (IRST)

Quinak-e Rakhshani (Persian: قوئينك رخشاني) (Note: Also romanized as Qū’īnak-e Rakhshānī; also known as Qa‘leh Quinak, Qal‘eh-ye Qūīnak, Qū’īnak, Qū’īnak-e Sūkhteh, and Qūnīk) is a village in Tarand-e Bala Rural District of Jalilabad District in Pishva County, Tehran province, Iran.

== Demographics ==
=== Population ===
At the time of the 2006 National Census, the village's population was 474 in 97 households, when it was in Behnamsokhteh-e Jonubi Rural District (Note: Renamed Jalilabad Rural District) of the former Pishva District in Varamin County. The following census in 2011 counted 388 people in 96 households, by which time the district had been separated from the county in the establishment of Pishva County. The rural district was transferred to the new Jalilabad District and renamed Jalilabad Rural District. Quinak-e Rakhshani was transferred to Tarand-e Bala Rural District created in the same district. The 2016 census measured the population of the village as 324 people in 95 households.
