= Dar-e Bala =

Village in Tehran province, Iran

Dar-e Bala Persian: دربالا
- Village
- Location within Iran
- Coordinates: 35°18′19″N 51°41′44″E
- Country: Iran
- Province: Tehran
- County: Pishva
- District: Central
- Rural District: Pishva
- Elevation: 909 m (2,982 ft)

Population (2016)
  - Total: 383
- Time zone: UTC+3:30 (IRST)

Dar-e Bala (Persian: دربالا) (Note: Also romanized as Darbālā and Dar-e Bālā) is a village in Pishva Rural District of the Central District in Pishva County, Tehran province, Iran.

== Demographics ==
=== Population ===
At the time of the 2006 National Census, the village's population was 544 in 116 households, when it was in Asgariyeh Rural District of the former Pishva District in Varamin County. The following census in 2011 counted 567 people in 124 households, by which time the district had been separated from the county in the establishment of Pishva County. The rural district was transferred to the new Central District, and Dar-e Bala was transferred to Pishva Rural District created in the same district. The 2016 census measured the population of the village as 383 people in 124 households.
