= Aliabad-e Khaleseh =

Village in Tehran province, Iran

Aliabad-e Khaleseh Persian: علي ابادخالصه
- Village
- Location within Iran
- Coordinates: 35°20′47″N 51°45′06″E
- Country: Iran
- Province: Tehran
- County: Pishva
- District: Jalilabad
- Rural District: Tarand-e Bala

Population (2016)
  - Total: 324
- Time zone: UTC+3:30 (IRST)

Aliabad-e Khaleseh (Persian: علي ابادخالصه) (Note: Also romanized as ‘Alīābād-e Khāleṣeh; also known as ‘Alīābād) is a village in Tarand-e Bala Rural District of Jalilabad District in Pishva County, Tehran province, Iran.

== Demographics ==
=== Population ===
At the time of the 2006 National Census, the village's population was 150 in 29 households, when it was in Behnamsokhteh-e Jonubi Rural District (Note: Renamed Jalilabad Rural District) of the former Pishva District in Varamin County. The following census in 2011 counted 333 people in 82 households, by which time the district had been separated from the county in the establishment of Pishva County. The rural district was transferred to the new Jalilabad District and renamed Jalilabad Rural District. Aliabad-e Khaleseh was transferred to Tarand-e Bala Rural District created in the same district. The 2016 census measured the population of the village as 324 people in 85 households.
