= Qeshlaq-e Moinabad =

Village in Tehran province, Iran

Qeshlaq-e Moinabad Persian: قشلاق معين اباد
- Village
- Location within Iran
- Coordinates: 35°17′23″N 51°41′01″E
- Country: Iran
- Province: Tehran
- County: Pishva
- District: Central
- Rural District: Pishva
- Elevation: 900 m (3,000 ft)

Population (2016)
  - Total: 371
- Time zone: UTC+3:30 (IRST)

Qeshlaq-e Moinabad (Persian: قشلاق معين اباد) (Note: Also romanized as Qeshlāq-e Mo‘īnābād) is a village in Pishva Rural District of the Central District in Pishva County, Tehran province, Iran.

== Demographics ==
=== Population ===
At the time of the 2006 National Census, the village's population was 383 in 93 households, when it was in Asgariyeh Rural District of the former Pishva District in Varamin County. The following census in 2011 counted 464 people in 105 households, by which time the district had been separated from the county in the establishment of Pishva County. The rural district was transferred to the new Central District, and Qeshlaq-e Moinabad was transferred to Pishva Rural District created in the same district. The 2016 census measured the population of the village as 371 people in 110 households.
