= Ebrahimabad, Pishva =

Village in Tehran province, Iran

Ebrahimabad Persian: ابراهيم اباد
- Village
- Location within Iran
- Coordinates: 35°17′55″N 51°41′25″E
- Country: Iran
- Province: Tehran
- County: Pishva
- District: Central
- Rural District: Pishva

Population (2016)
  - Total: 10
- Time zone: UTC+3:30 (IRST)

Ebrahimabad (Persian: ابراهيم اباد) (Note: Also romanized as Ebrāhīmābād) is a village in Pishva Rural District of the Central District in Pishva County, Tehran province, Iran.

== Demographics ==
=== Population ===
At the time of the 2006 National Census, the village's population was 26 in seven households, when it was in Asgariyeh Rural District of the former Pishva District in Varamin County. The following census in 2011 counted 19 people in seven households, by which time the district had been separated from the county in the establishment of Pishva County. The rural district was transferred to the new Central District and Pishva Rural District was created in the same district. The 2016 census measured the population of the village as 10 people in five households.
