= Shoeybabad-e Now =

Village in Tehran province, Iran

Shoeybabad-e Now Persian: شعيب ابادنو
- Village
- Location within Iran
- Coordinates: 35°21′36″N 51°42′45″E
- Country: Iran
- Province: Tehran
- County: Pishva
- District: Jalilabad
- Rural District: Tarand-e Bala
- Elevation: 969 m (3,179 ft)

Population (2016)
  - Total: 412
- Time zone: UTC+3:30 (IRST)

Shoeybabad-e Now (Persian: شعيب ابادنو) (Note: Also romanized as Sho‘eybābād-e Now and Sha‘ībābād-e Now; also known as Sho‘eybābād) is a village in Tarand-e Bala Rural District of Jalilabad District in Pishva County, Tehran province, Iran.

== Demographics ==
=== Population ===
At the time of the 2006 National Census, the village's population was 511 in 123 households, when it was in Behnamsokhteh-e Jonubi Rural District (Note: Renamed Jalilabad Rural District) of the former Pishva District in Varamin County. The following census in 2011 counted 475 people in 116 households, by which time the district had been separated from the county in the establishment of Pishva County. The rural district was transferred to the new Jalilabad District and renamed Jalilabad Rural District. Shoeybabad-e Now was transferred to Tarand-e Bala Rural District created in the same district. The 2016 census measured the population of the village as 412 people in 103 households.
