= Mahmudabad-e Now =

Village in Tehran province, Iran

Mahmudabad-e Now Persian: محمودابادنو
- Village
- Location within Iran
- Coordinates: 35°19′25″N 51°47′34″E
- Country: Iran
- Province: Tehran
- County: Pishva
- District: Jalilabad
- Rural District: Jalilabad
- Elevation: 962 m (3,156 ft)

Population (2016)
  - Total: 190
- Time zone: UTC+3:30 (IRST)

Mahmudabad-e Now (Persian: محمودابادنو) (Note: Also romanized as Maḩmūdābād Now and Maḩmūdābād-e Now; also known as Maḩmūdābād and Mahūdābād Now) is a village in Jalilabad Rural District (Note: Formerly Behnamsokhteh-e Jonubi Rural District) of Jalilabad District in Pishva County, Tehran province, Iran.

== Demographics ==
=== Population ===
At the time of the 2006 National Census, the village's population was 169 in 38 households, when it was in Behnamsokhteh-e Jonubi Rural District (Note: Renamed Jalilabad Rural District) of the former Pishva District in Varamin County. The following census in 2011 counted 224 people in 70 households, by which time the district had been separated from the county in the establishment of Pishva County. The rural district was transferred to the new Jalilabad District and renamed Jalilabad Rural District. The 2016 census measured the population of the village as 190 people in 60 households.
