= Tarand-e Pain =

Village in Tehran province, Iran

Tarand-e Pain Persian: طارندپائين
- Village
- Location within Iran
- Coordinates: 35°21′38″N 51°43′17″E
- Country: Iran
- Province: Tehran
- County: Pishva
- District: Jalilabad
- Rural District: Tarand-e Bala
- Elevation: 966 m (3,169 ft)

Population (2016)
  - Total: 768
- Time zone: UTC+3:30 (IRST)

Tarand-e Pain (Persian: طارندپائين) (Note: Also romanized as Ţārand-e Pā’īn; also known as Ţārand-e Soflá) is a village in Tarand-e Bala Rural District of Jalilabad District in Pishva County, Tehran province, Iran.

== Demographics ==
=== Population ===
At the time of the 2006 National Census, the village's population was 847 in 188 households, when it was in Behnamsokhteh-e Jonubi Rural District (Note: Renamed Jalilabad Rural District) of the former Pishva District in Varamin County. The following census in 2011 counted 924 people in 222 households, by which time the district had been separated from the county in the establishment of Pishva County. The rural district was transferred to the new Jalilabad District and renamed Jalilabad Rural District. Tarand-e Pain was transferred to Tarand-e Bala Rural District created in the same district. The 2016 census measured the population of the village as 768 people in 196 households.
