= Zavareh Bid =

Zavareh Bid زواره بيد
- village
- Location within Iran
- Coordinates: 35°21′37″N 51°45′12″E
- Country: Iran
- Province: Tehran
- County: Pishva
- Bakhsh: Jalilabad
- Rural District: Tarand
- Elevation: 969 m (3,179 ft)

Population (2006)
  - Total: 467
- Time zone: UTC+3:30 (IRST)
  - Summer (DST): UTC+4:30 (IRDT)

Zavareh Bid (Persian: زواره بيد, also Romanized as Zavāreh Bīd; also known as Zavār Bīd and ‘Alīābād-e Zavāreh Bīd) is a village in Tarand Rural District, Jalilabad District, Pishva County, Tehran Province, Iran. At the 2006 census, its population was 467, in 87 families.
