= Akbarabad-e Kazemi =

Village in Tehran province, Iran

Akbarabad-e Kazemi Persian: اكبرابادكاظمي
- Village
- Location within Iran
- Coordinates: 35°18′25″N 51°49′25″E
- Country: Iran
- Province: Tehran
- County: Pishva
- District: Jalilabad
- Rural District: Jalilabad

Population (2016)
  - Total: Below reporting threshold
- Time zone: UTC+3:30 (IRST)

Akbarabad-e Kazemi (Persian: اكبرابادكاظمي) (Note: Also romanized as Akbarābād-e Kāẓemī; also known as Akbarābād) is a village in Jalilabad Rural District (Note: Formerly Behnamsokhteh-e Jonubi Rural District) of Jalilabad District in Pishva County, Tehran province, Iran.

== Demographics ==
=== Population ===
At the time of the 2006 National Census, the village's population was 57 in 14 households, when it was in Behnamsokhteh-e Jonubi Rural District (Note: Renamed Jalilabad Rural District) of the former Pishva District in Varamin County. The following census in 2011 counted a population below the reporting threshold, by which time the district had been separated from the county in the establishment of Pishva County. The rural district was transferred to the new Jalilabad District and renamed Jalilabad Rural District. The 2016 census again measured the population of the village as below the reporting threshold.
