= Yusefabad, Pishva =

Village in Tehran province, Iran

Yusefabad Persian: يوسفاباد
- Village
- Location within Iran
- Coordinates: 35°17′27″N 51°51′17″E
- Country: Iran
- Province: Tehran
- County: Pishva
- District: Jalilabad
- Rural District: Jalilabad

Population (2016)
  - Total: 22
- Time zone: UTC+3:30 (IRST)

Yusefabad (Persian: يوسفاباد) (Note: Also romanized as Yūsefābād) is a village in Jalilabad Rural District (Note: Formerly Behnamsokhteh-e Jonubi Rural District) of Jalilabad District in Pishva County, Tehran province, Iran.

== Demographics ==
=== Population ===
At the time of the 2006 National Census, the village's population was below the reporting threshold, when it was in Behnamsokhteh-e Jonubi Rural District (Note: Renamed Jalilabad Rural District) of the former Pishva District in Varamin County. The following census in 2011 again counted a population below the reporting threshold, by which time the district had been separated from the county in the establishment of Pishva County. The rural district was transferred to the new Jalilabad District and renamed Jalilabad Rural District. The 2016 census measured the population of the village as 22 people in 13 households.
