= Gol Abbas =

Village in Tehran province, Iran

Gol Abbas Persian: گل عباس
- Village
- Location within Iran
- Coordinates: 35°21′53″N 51°39′37″E
- Country: Iran
- Province: Tehran
- County: Pishva
- District: Central
- Rural District: Asgariyeh
- Elevation: 953 m (3,127 ft)

Population (2016)
  - Total: 1,391
- Time zone: UTC+3:30 (IRST)

Gol Abbas (Persian: گل عباس) (Note: Also romanized as Gol ‘Abbās and Gol-e ‘Abbās; also known as Qeshlāq Gol-e ‘Abbās) is a village in Asgariyeh Rural District of the Central District in Pishva County, Tehran province, Iran.

== Demographics ==
=== Population ===
At the time of the 2006 National Census, the village's population was 1,383 in 313 households, when it was in the former Pishva District of Varamin County. The following census in 2011 counted 1,652 people in 403 households, by which time the district had been separated from the county in the establishment of Pishva County. The rural district was transferred to the new Central District. The 2016 census measured the population of the village as 1,391 people in 386 households.
