= Mahmudabad-e Kohneh =

Village in Tehran province, Iran

Mahmudabad-e Kohneh Persian: محمودابادكهنه
- Village
- Location within Iran
- Coordinates: 35°19′46″N 51°48′49″E
- Country: Iran
- Province: Tehran
- County: Pishva
- District: Jalilabad
- Rural District: Jalilabad
- Elevation: 956 m (3,136 ft)

Population (2016)
  - Total: 109
- Time zone: UTC+3:30 (IRST)

Mahmudabad-e Kohneh (Persian: محمودابادكهنه) (Note: Also romanized as Maḩmūdābād-e Kohneh) is a village in Jalilabad Rural District (Note: Formerly Behnamsokhteh-e Jonubi Rural District) of Jalilabad District in Pishva County, Tehran province, Iran.

== Demographics ==
=== Population ===
At the time of the 2006 National Census, the village's population was 104 in 23 households, when it was in Behnamsokhteh-e Jonubi Rural District (Note: Renamed Jalilabad Rural District) of the former Pishva District in Varamin County. The following census in 2011 counted 98 people in 24 households, by which time the district had been separated from the county in the establishment of Pishva County. The rural district was transferred to the new Jalilabad District and renamed Jalilabad Rural District. The 2016 census measured the population of the village as 109 people in 24 households.
