= Asgarabad-e Abbasi =

Village in Tehran province, Iran

Asgarabad-e Abbasi Persian: عسگراباد عباسي
- Village
- Location within Iran
- Coordinates: 35°20′04″N 51°40′24″E
- Country: Iran
- Province: Tehran
- County: Pishva
- District: Central
- Rural District: Asgariyeh
- Elevation: 931 m (3,054 ft)

Population (2016)
  - Total: 938
- Time zone: UTC+3:30 (IRST)

Asgarabad-e Abbasi (Persian: عسگرابادعباسي) (Note: Also romanized as ‘Asgarābād-e ‘Abbāsī; also known as ‘Asgarābād) is a village in, and the capital of, Asgariyeh Rural District in the Central District of Pishva County, Tehran province, Iran.

== Demographics ==
=== Population ===
At the time of the 2006 National Census, the village's population was 1,024 in 268 households, when it was in the former Pishva District of Varamin County. The following census in 2011 counted 910 people in 287 households, by which time the district had been separated from the county in the establishment of Pishva County. The rural district was transferred to the new Central District. The 2016 census measured the population of the village as 938 people in 305 households.
