= Tarand-e Bala =

Village in Tehran province, Iran

Tarand-e Bala Persian: طارند بالا
- Village
- Location within Iran
- Coordinates: 35°21′54″N 51°43′46″E
- Country: Iran
- Province: Tehran
- County: Pishva
- District: Jalilabad
- Rural District: Tarand-e Bala
- Elevation: 973 m (3,192 ft)

Population (2016)
  - Total: 1,283
- Time zone: UTC+3:30 (IRST)

Tarand-e Bala (Persian: طارندبالا) (Note: Also romanized as Ţārand-e Bālā; also known as Ţārand-e ‘Olyā) is a village in, and the capital of, Tarand-e Bala Rural District in Jalilabad District of Pishva County, Tehran province, Iran.

== Demographics ==
=== Population ===
At the time of the 2006 National Census, the village's population was 1,173 in 262 households, when it was in Behnamsokhteh-e Jonubi Rural District (Note: Renamed Jalilabad Rural District) of the former Pishva District in Varamin County. The following census in 2011 counted 1,375 people in 348 households, by which time the district had been separated from the county in the establishment of Pishva County. The rural district was transferred to the new Jalilabad District and renamed Jalilabad Rural District. Tarand-e Bala was transferred to Tarand-e Bala Rural District created in the same district. The 2016 census measured the population of the village as 1,283 people in 327 households. It was the most populous village in its rural district.
