= Ahiyeh =

Ahiyeh اهيه
- village
- Location within Iran
- Coordinates: 35°21′07″N 51°45′16″E
- Country: Iran
- Province: Tehran
- County: Pishva
- Bakhsh: Jalilabad
- Rural District: Tarand
- Elevation: 967 m (3,173 ft)

Population (2006)
  - Total: 275
- Time zone: UTC+3:30 (IRST)
  - Summer (DST): UTC+4:30 (IRDT)

Ahiyeh (Persian: اهيه, also Romanized as Āhīyeh; also known as ‘Alīābād-e Āhīyeh) is a village in Tarand Rural District, Jalilabad District, Pishva County, Tehran Province, Iran. At the 2006 census, its population was 275, in 53 families.
