= Deh-e Masin =

Village in Tehran province, Iran

Deh-e Masin Persian: ده ماسين
- Village
- Location within Iran
- Coordinates: 35°19′14″N 51°41′05″E
- Country: Iran
- Province: Tehran
- County: Pishva
- District: Central
- Rural District: Asgariyeh
- Elevation: 931 m (3,054 ft)

Population (2016)
  - Total: 580
- Time zone: UTC+3:30 (IRST)

Deh-e Masin (Persian: ده ماسين) (Note: Also romanized as Deh Māsīn and Deh-e Māsīn; also known as Deh Pāsīn) is a village in Asgariyeh Rural District of the Central District in Pishva County, Tehran province, Iran.

== Demographics ==
=== Population ===
At the time of the 2006 National Census, the village's population was 555 in 120 households, when it was in the former Pishva District of Varamin County. The following census in 2011 counted 602 people in 163 households, by which time the district had been separated from the county in the establishment of Pishva County. The rural district was transferred to the new Central District. The 2016 census measured the population of the village as 580 people in 165 households.
