= Qaleh Now, Pishva =

Village in Tehran province, Iran

Qaleh Now Persian: قلعه نو
- Village
- Location within Iran
- Coordinates: 35°21′17″N 51°46′09″E
- Country: Iran
- Province: Tehran
- County: Pishva
- District: Jalilabad
- Rural District: Jalilabad
- Elevation: 971 m (3,186 ft)

Population (2016)
  - Total: 655
- Time zone: UTC+3:30 (IRST)

Qaleh Now (Persian: قلعه نو) (Note: Also romanized as Qal‘eh Now) is a village in Jalilabad Rural District (Note: Formerly Behnamsokhteh-e Jonubi Rural District) of Jalilabad District in Pishva County, Tehran Province, Iran.

== Demographics ==
=== Population ===
At the time of the 2006 National Census, the village's population was 646 in 146 households, when it was in Behnamsokhteh-e Jonubi Rural District (Note: Renamed Jalilabad Rural District) of the former Pishva District in Varamin County. The following census in 2011 counted 638 people in 162 households, by which time the district had been separated from the county in the establishment of Pishva County. The rural district was transferred to the new Jalilabad District and renamed Jalilabad Rural District. The 2016 census measured the population of the village as 655 people in 175 households.
