= Jameh Karan =

Jameh Karan جامه كاران
- Village
- Location within Iran
- Coordinates: 35°22′12″N 51°46′13″E
- Country: Iran
- Province: Tehran
- County: Pishva
- Bakhsh: Jalilabad
- Rural District: Tarand

Population (2006)
  - Total: 102
- Time zone: UTC+3:30 (IRST)
  - Summer (DST): UTC+4:30 (IRDT)

Jameh Karan (Persian: جامه كاران, also Romanized as Jāmeh Kārān, Jom‘eh Kārān, and Chūmeh Kārān) is a village in Tarand Rural District, Jalilabad District, Pishva County, Tehran Province, Iran. At the 2006 census, its population was 102, in 25 families.
