= Salehabad, Pishva =

Salehabad صالح اباد
- Village
- Location within Iran
- Coordinates: 35°25′35″N 51°37′03″E
- Country: Iran
- Province: Tehran
- County: Pishva
- Bakhsh: Jalilabad
- Rural District: Tarand

Population (2006)
  - Total: 172
- Time zone: UTC+3:30 (IRST)
  - Summer (DST): UTC+4:30 (IRDT)

Salehabad (Persian: صالح اباد, also Romanized as Şāleḩābād and Şālehābād) is a village in Tarand Rural District, Jalilabad District, Pishva County, Tehran Province, Iran. At the 2006 census, its population was 172, in 36 families.
