= Shuran, Tehran =

Village in Tehran province, Iran

Shuran Persian: شوران
- Village
- Location within Iran
- Coordinates: 35°20′42″N 51°44′17″E
- Country: Iran
- Province: Tehran
- County: Pishva
- District: Jalilabad
- Rural District: Tarand-e Bala
- Elevation: 956 m (3,136 ft)

Population (2016)
  - Total: 688
- Time zone: UTC+3:30 (IRST)

Shuran (Persian: شوران) (Note: Also romanized as Shūrān) is a village in Tarand-e Bala Rural District of Jalilabad District in Pishva County, Tehran province, Iran.

== Demographics ==
=== Population ===
At the time of the 2006 National Census, the village's population was 643 in 149 households, when it was in Behnamsokhteh-e Jonubi Rural District (Note: Renamed Jalilabad Rural District) of the former Pishva District in Varamin County. The following census in 2011 counted 652 people in 172 households, by which time the district had been separated from the county in the establishment of Pishva County. The rural district was transferred to the new Jalilabad District and renamed Jalilabad Rural District. Shuran was transferred to Tarand-e Bala Rural District created in the same district. The 2016 census measured the population of the village as 688 people in 202 households.
