= Habibabad, Tehran =

Village in Tehran province, Iran

Habibabad Persian: حبیبآباد
- Village
- Location within Iran
- Coordinates: 35°19′31″N 51°42′38″E
- Country: Iran
- Province: Tehran
- County: Pishva
- District: Central
- Rural District: Asgariyeh
- Elevation: 931 m (3,054 ft)

Population (2016)
  - Total: 2,310
- Time zone: UTC+3:30 (IRST)

Habibabad (Persian: حبيباباد) (Note: Also romanized as Ḩabībābād) is a village in Asgariyeh Rural District of the Central District in Pishva County, Tehran province, Iran.

== Demographics ==
=== Population ===
At the time of the 2006 National Census, the village's population was 2,333 in 551 households, when it was in the former Pishva District of Varamin County. The following census in 2011 counted 2,283 people in 585 households, by which time the district had been separated from the county in the establishment of Pishva County. The rural district was transferred to the new Central District. The 2016 census measured the population of the village as 2,310 people in 621 households. It was the most populous village in its rural district.
