= Qeshlaq-e Yusef Reza =

Village in Tehran province, Iran

Qeshlaq-e Yusef Reza Persian: قشلاق يوسفرضا
- Village
- Location within Iran
- Coordinates: 35°21′27″N 51°41′34″E
- Country: Iran
- Province: Tehran
- County: Pishva
- District: Central
- Rural District: Asgariyeh

Population (2016)
  - Total: 1,453
- Time zone: UTC+3:30 (IRST)

Qeshlaq-e Yusef Reza (Persian: قشلاق يوسفرضا) (Note: Also romanized as Qeshlāq-e Yūsef Reẕā and Qeshlāq-e Yūsof Reẕā; also known as Yūsef Reẕā) is a village in Asgariyeh Rural District of the Central District in Pishva County, Tehran province, Iran.

== Demographics ==
=== Population ===
At the time of the 2006 National Census, the village's population was 1,289 in 285 households, when it was in the former Pishva District of Varamin County. The following census in 2011 counted 1,523 people in 346 households, by which time the district had been separated from the county in the establishment of Pishva County. The rural district was transferred to the new Central District. The 2016 census measured the population of the village as 1,453 people in 361 households.
