= Saidabad, Pishva =

Village in Tehran province, Iran

Saidabad Persian: سعيداباد
- Village
- Location within Iran
- Coordinates: 35°22′44″N 51°41′29″E
- Country: Iran
- Province: Tehran
- County: Pishva
- District: Central
- Rural District: Asgariyeh

Population (2016)
  - Total: 453
- Time zone: UTC+3:30 (IRST)

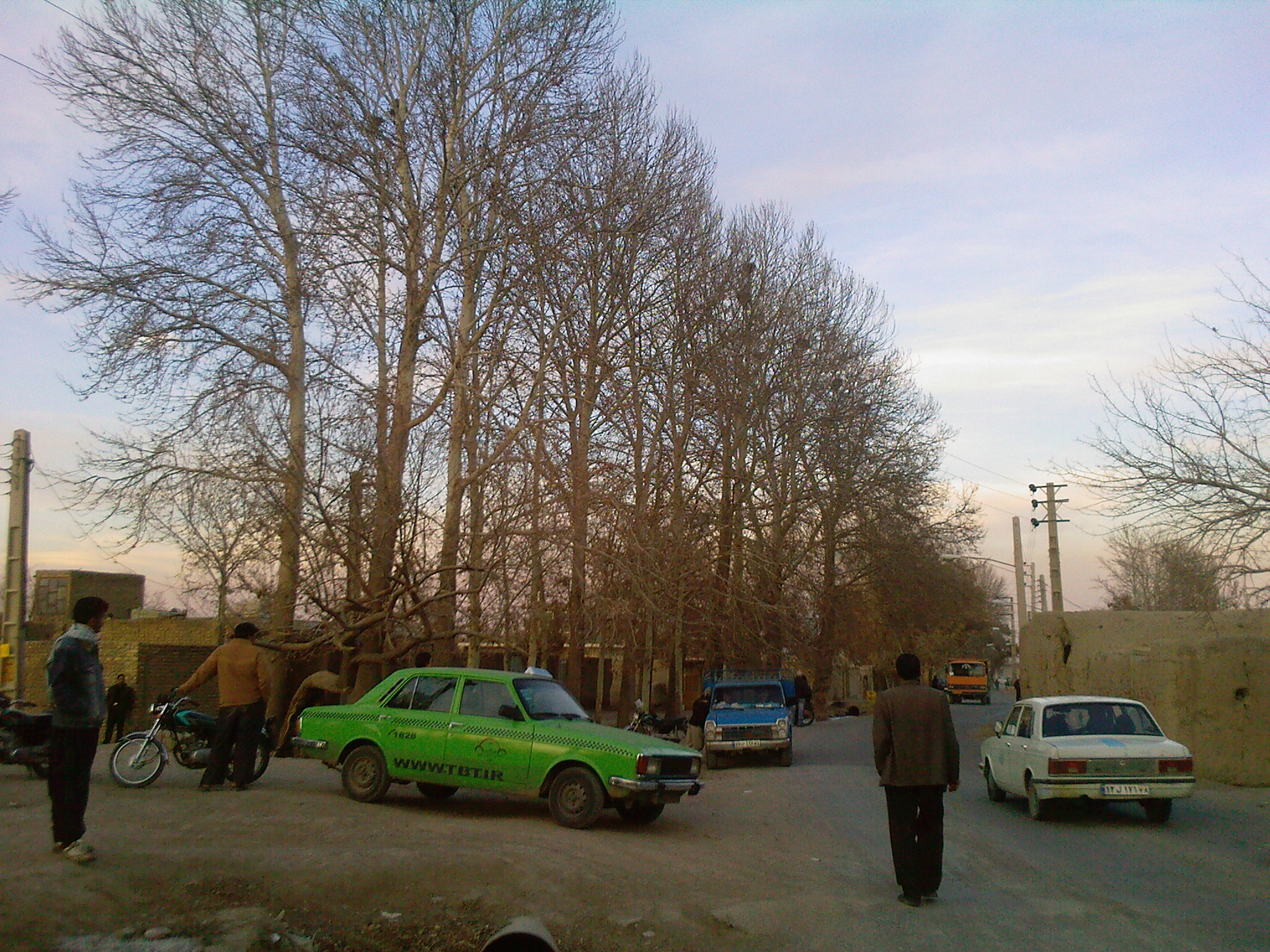
Saidabad

Saidabad (Persian: سعيداباد) (Note: Also romanized as Sa‘īdābād; also known as S‘adābād and Sa‘dābād) is a village in Asgariyeh Rural District of the Central District in Pishva County, Tehran province, Iran.

== Demographics ==
=== Population ===
At the time of the 2006 National Census, the village's population was 526 in 118 households, when it was in the former Pishva District of Varamin County. The following census in 2011 counted 550 people in 148 households, by which time the district had been separated from the county in the establishment of Pishva County. The rural district was transferred to the new Central District. The 2016 census measured the population of the village as 453 people in 123 households.
