= Qaleh Bala, Tehran =

Qaleh Bala قلعه بالا
- Village
- Location within Iran
- Coordinates: 35°22′02″N 51°42′44″E
- Country: Iran
- Province: Tehran
- County: Pishva
- Bakhsh: Jalilabad
- Rural District: Tarand

Population (2006)
  - Total: 57
- Time zone: UTC+3:30 (IRST)
  - Summer (DST): UTC+4:30 (IRDT)

Qaleh Bala (Persian: قلعه بالا, also Romanized as Qal‘eh Bālā and Qal‘eh-ye Bālā) is a village in Tarand Rural District, Jalilabad District, Pishva County, Tehran Province, Iran. At the 2006 census, its population was 57, in 11 families.
