= Tarand =

Tarand may refer to:

== People ==
- Andres Tarand (born 1940), Estonian politician
- Helmut Tarand (1911–1987), Estonian poet, philiogist and cultural figure
- Indrek Tarand (born 1964), Estonian politician
- Kaarel Tarand (born 1966), Estonian journalist

== Places ==
- Tarand-e Bala, village in Tehran Province, Iran
- Tarand-e Pain, village in Tehran Province, Iran
- Tarand Rural District, administrative subdivision of Tehran Province, Iran

== Other ==
- Tarand (animal), a legendary creature first mentioned by Pliny the Elder
- Tarand grave, a type of Iron Age burial associated with Baltic Finnic peoples.
