= Qeshlaq-e Jalilabad =

Village in Tehran province, Iran

Qeshlaq-e Jalilabad Persian: قشلاق جليل اباد
- Village
- Location within Iran
- Coordinates: 35°21′40″N 51°47′38″E
- Country: Iran
- Province: Tehran
- County: Pishva
- District: Jalilabad
- Rural District: Jalilabad
- Elevation: 981 m (3,219 ft)

Population (2016)
  - Total: 462
- Time zone: UTC+3:30 (IRST)

Qeshlaq-e Jalilabad (Persian: قشلاق جليل اباد) (Note: Also romanized as Qeshlāq-e Jalīlābād) is a village in Jalilabad Rural District (Note: Formerly Behnamsokhteh-e Jonubi Rural District) of Jalilabad District in Pishva County, Tehran province, Iran.

== Demographics ==
=== Population ===
At the time of the 2006 National Census, the village's population was 596 in 141 households, when it was in Behnamsokhteh-e Jonubi Rural District (Note: Renamed Jalilabad Rural District) of the former Pishva District in Varamin County. The following census in 2011 counted 581 people in 158 households, by which time the district had been separated from the county in the establishment of Pishva County. The rural district was transferred to the new Jalilabad District and renamed Jalilabad Rural District. The 2016 census measured the population of the village as 462 people in 143 households.
