= Shotor Khvar, Pishva =

Village in Tehran province, Iran

Shotor Khvar Persian: شترخوار
- Village
- Location within Iran
- Coordinates: 35°19′56″N 51°48′50″E
- Country: Iran
- Province: Tehran
- County: Pishva
- District: Jalilabad
- Rural District: Jalilabad
- Elevation: 957 m (3,140 ft)

Population (2016)
  - Total: 301
- Time zone: UTC+3:30 (IRST)

Shotor Khvar (Persian: شترخوار) (Note: Also romanized as Shotor Khār and Shotor Khvār; also known as Maḩmūdābād-e Shotor Khvār) is a village in Jalilabad Rural District (Note: Formerly Behnamsokhteh-e Jonubi Rural District) of Jalilabad District in Pishva County, Tehran province, Iran.

== Demographics ==
=== Population ===
At the time of the 2006 National Census, the village's population was 340 in 81 households, when it was in Behnamsokhteh-e Jonubi Rural District (Note: Renamed Jalilabad Rural District) of the former Pishva District in Varamin County. The following census in 2011 counted 367 people in 111 households, by which time the district had been separated from the county in the establishment of Pishva County. The rural district was transferred to the new Jalilabad District and renamed Jalilabad Rural District. The 2016 census measured the population of the village as 301 people in 82 households.
