= Shuran, Iran =

Shuran may refer to:

- Shuran, Chaharmahal and Bakhtiari
- Shuran, Lorestan
- Suran, Sistan and Baluchestan
- Shuran, Tehran
