= Sar Gol, Tehran =

Village in Tehran province, Iran

Sar Gol Persian: سرگل
- Village
- Location within Iran
- Coordinates: 35°22′49″N 51°40′07″E
- Country: Iran
- Province: Tehran
- County: Pishva
- District: Central
- Rural District: Asgariyeh
- Elevation: 967 m (3,173 ft)

Population (2016)
  - Total: 1,563
- Time zone: UTC+3:30 (IRST)

Sar Gol (Persian: سرگل) (Note: Also romanized as Sargol) is a village in Asgariyeh Rural District of the Central District in Pishva County, Tehran province, Iran.

== Demographics ==
=== Population ===
At the time of the 2006 National Census, the village's population was 1,692 in 351 households, when it was in the former Pishva District of Varamin County. The following census in 2011 counted 1,598 people in 404 households, by which time the district had been separated from the county in the establishment of Pishva County. The rural district was transferred to the new Central District. The 2016 census measured the population of the village as 1,563 people in 437 households.
