= Palang Darreh, Tehran =

Palang Darreh پلنگ دره
- village
- Location within Iran
- Coordinates: 35°21′17″N 51°39′55″E
- Country: Iran
- Province: Tehran
- County: Pishva
- Bakhsh: Central
- Rural District: Asgariyeh
- Elevation: 946 m (3,104 ft)

Population (2006)
  - Total: 260
- Time zone: UTC+3:30 (IRST)
  - Summer (DST): UTC+4:30 (IRDT)

Palang Darreh (Persian: پلنگ دره; also known as Palang Darreh-ye Bālā) is a village in Asgariyeh Rural District, in the Central District of Pishva County, Tehran Province, Iran. At the 2006 census, its population was 260, with 63 families.
