= Chaleh Murt =

Chaleh Murt or Chalehmurt (Persian: چاله مورت) may refer to:

- Chaleh Murt, Hormozgan
- Chaleh Murt, Tehran
