= Arsenical bronze =

Alloy

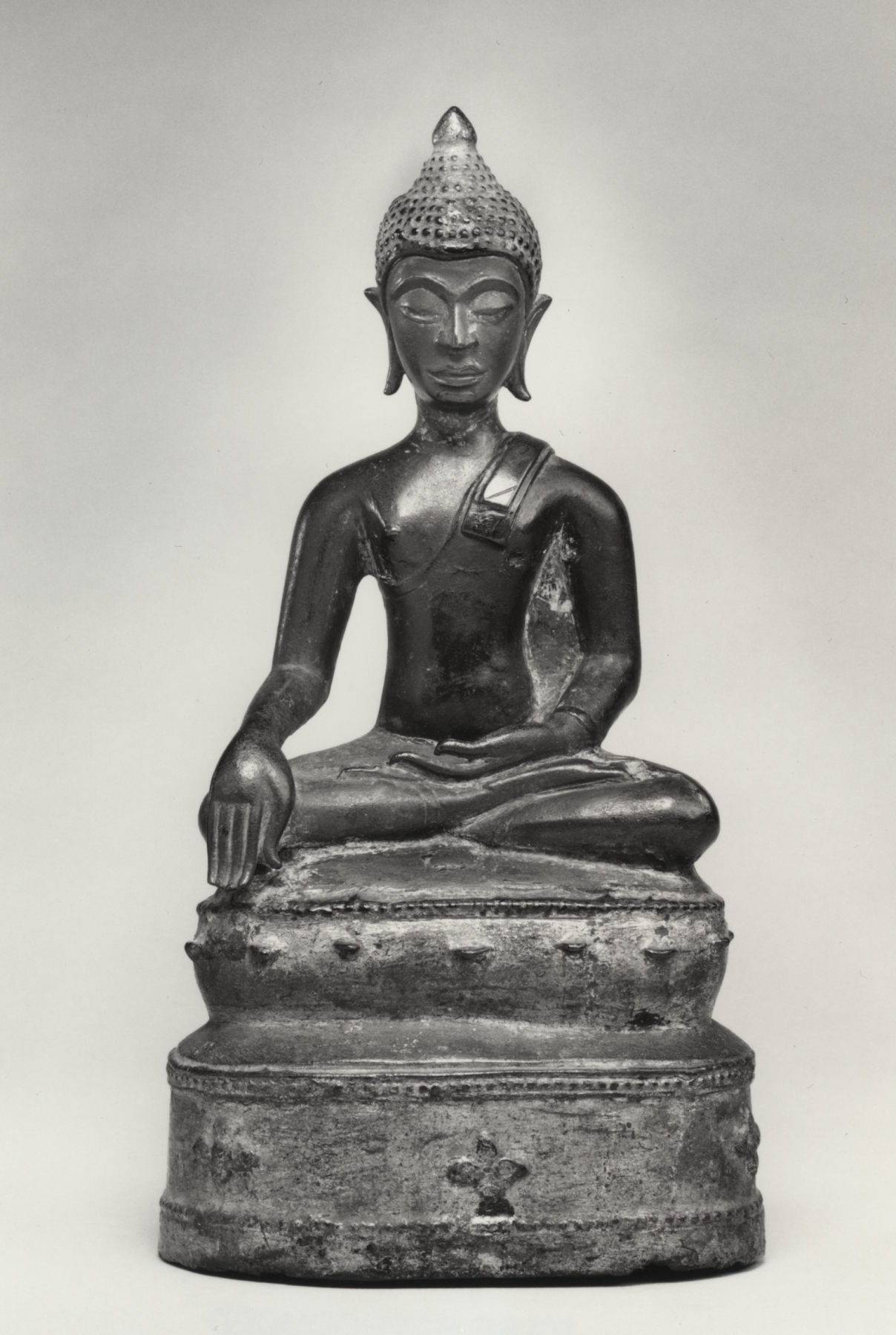
A seated Buddha from Thailand (c. 1800) made of arsenical bronze

Arsenical bronze is an alloy in which arsenic, as opposed to or in addition to tin or other constituent metals, is combined with copper to make bronze. The use of arsenic with copper, either as the secondary constituent or with another component such as tin, results in a stronger final product and better casting behavior.

Copper ore is often naturally contaminated with arsenic; hence, the term "arsenical bronze" when used in archaeology is typically only applied to alloys with an arsenic content higher than 1% by weight, in order to distinguish it from potentially accidental additions of arsenic.

== Origins in pre-history ==
Copper and arsenic ores
Ore name	Chemical formula
Arsenopyrite	FeAsS
Enargite	Cu_{3}AsS_{4}
Olivenite	Cu_{2}(AsO_{4})OH
Tennantite	Cu_{12}As_{4}S_{13}
Malachite	Cu_{2}(OH)_{2}CO_{3}
Azurite	Cu_{3}(OH)_{2}(CO_{3})_{2}

Although arsenical bronze occurs in the archaeological record across the globe, the earliest artifacts so far known, dating from the 5th millennium BC, have been found on the Iranian plateau. Arsenic is present in a number of copper-containing ores (see table at right, adapted from Lechtman & Klein, 1999), and therefore some contamination of the copper with arsenic would be unavoidable. However, it is still not entirely clear to what extent arsenic was deliberately added to copper and to what extent its use arose simply from its presence in copper ores that were then treated by smelting to produce the metal.

Reconstructing a possible sequence of events in prehistory involves considering the structure of copper ore deposits, which are mostly sulfides. The surface minerals would contain some native copper and oxidized minerals, but much of the copper and other minerals would have been washed further into the ore body, forming a secondary enrichment zone. This includes many minerals such as tennantite, with their arsenic, copper and iron. Thus, the surface deposits would have been used first; with some work, deeper sulfidic ores would have been uncovered and worked, and it would have been discovered that the material from this level had better properties.

Using these various ores, there are four possible methods that may have been used to produce arsenical bronze alloys. These are:

- The direct addition of arsenic-bearing metals or ores such as realgar to molten copper. This method, although possible, lacks evidence.
- The reduction of antimony-bearing copper arsenates or fahlore to produce an alloy high in arsenic and antimony. This is entirely practicable.
- The reduction of roasted copper sulfarsenides such as tennantite and enargite. This method would result in the production of toxic fumes of arsenous oxide and the loss of much of the arsenic present in the ores.
- The co-smelting of oxidic and sulfidic ores such as malachite and arsenopyrite together. This method has been demonstrated to work well, with little in the way of dangerous fumes given off during it, because of the reactions between the minerals.

Greater sophistication of metal workers is suggested by Thornton et al. They suggest that iron arsenide was deliberately produced as part of the copper-smelting process, to be traded and used to make arsenical bronze elsewhere by addition to molten copper.

Artifacts made of arsenical bronze cover the complete spectrum of metal objects, from axes to ornaments. The method of manufacture involved heating the metal in crucibles, and casting it into moulds made of stone or clay. After solidifying, it would be polished or, in the case of axes and other tools, work-hardened by beating the working edge with a hammer, thinning out the metal and increasing its strength. Finished objects could also be engraved or decorated as appropriate.

== Advantages ==
While arsenic was most likely originally mixed with copper as a result of the ores already containing it, its use probably continued for a number of reasons. First, it acts as a deoxidizer, reacting with oxygen in the hot metal to form arsenous oxides which vaporize from the liquid metal. If a great deal of oxygen is dissolved in liquid copper, when the metal cools the copper oxide separates out at grain boundaries, and greatly reduces the ductility of the resulting object. However, its use can lead to a greater risk of porous castings, owing to the solution of hydrogen in the molten metal and its subsequent loss as a bubble (although any bubbles could be forge-welded and still leave the mass of the metal ready to be work-hardened).

Second, the alloy is capable of greater work-hardening than is the case with pure copper, so that it performs better when used for cutting or chopping. An increase in work-hardening capability arises with an increasing percentage of arsenic, and the bronze can be work-hardened over a wide range of temperatures without fear of embrittlement. Its improved properties over pure copper can be seen with as little as 0.5 to 2 wt% As, giving a 10-to-30% improvement in hardness and tensile strength.

Third, in the correct percentages, it can contribute a silvery sheen to the article being manufactured. There is evidence of arsenical bronze daggers from the Caucasus and other artifacts from different locations having an arsenic-rich surface layer which may well have been produced deliberately by ancient craftsmen, and Mexican bells were made of copper with sufficient arsenic to color them silver.

== Sites and civilisations ==
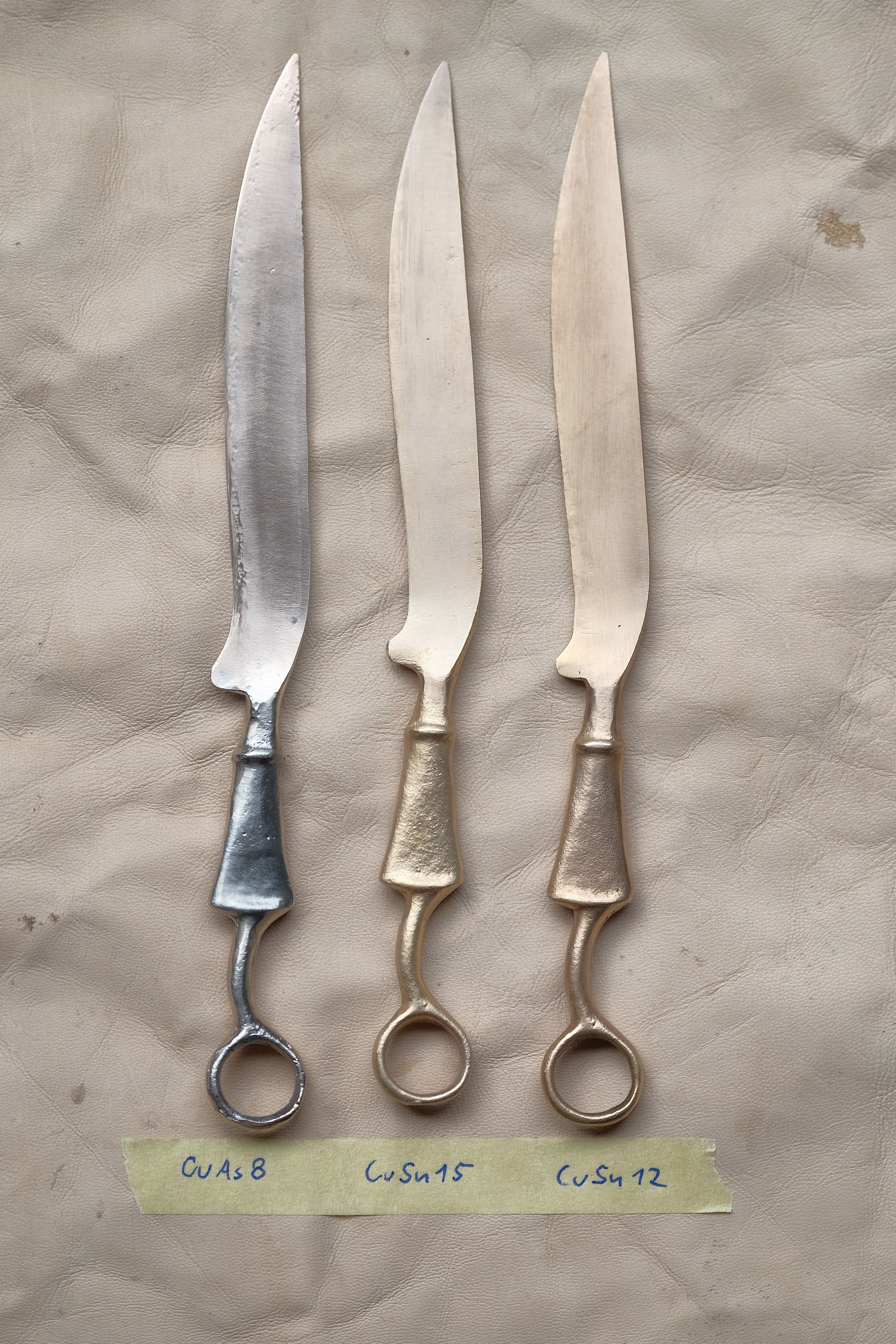
Reproductions of Bronze Age knives made from high-arsenic bronze (left) and tin bronze (center and right). Depending on the content of arsenic, the alloy is of pale red to silverish color.

Arsenical bronze was used by many societies and cultures across the globe. Firstly, the Iranian plateau, followed by the adjacent Mesopotamian area, together covering modern Iran, Iraq and Syria, has the earliest arsenical bronze metallurgy in the world, as previously mentioned. It was in use from the 4th millennium BC through to mid 2nd millennium BC, a period of nearly 2,000 years. There was a great deal of variation in arsenic content of artifacts throughout this period, making it impossible to say exactly how much was added deliberately and how much came about by accident.

These matters were clarified considerably by 2016. The two relevant ancient sites in eastern Turkey (Malatya Province) are Norşuntepe and Değirmentepe, where arsenical bronze production was taking place before 4000 BC. Hearths or natural draft furnaces, slag, ore, and pigment had been recovered throughout these sites. This was in the context of architectural complexes typical of southern Mesopotamian architecture.

According to Boscher (2016), at Değirmentepe, arsenical copper objects were clearly manufactured around 4200 BC, yet the technological aspects of this production remain unclear. This is because the primary smelting of ore seems to have been undertaken elsewhere, perhaps already at the sites of mining.

In contrast, the related Norşuntepe site provides a better context of production, and demonstrates that some form of arsenic alloying was indeed taking place by the 4th millennium BC. Since the slag identified at Norşuntepe contains no arsenic, this means that arsenic in some form was added separately.

Societies using arsenical bronze include the Akkadians, those of Ur, and the Amorites, all based around the Tigris and Euphrates rivers and centres of the trade networks which spread arsenical bronze across the Middle East during the Bronze Age.

The Chalcolithic-period Nahal Mishmar hoard in the Judean Desert west of the Dead Sea contains a number of arsenical bronze (4–12% arsenic) and perhaps arsenical copper artifacts made using the lost-wax process, the earliest known use of this complex technique. "Carbon-14 dating of the reed mat in which the objects were wrapped suggests that it dates to at least 3500 B.C. It was in this period that the use of copper became widespread throughout the Levant, attesting to considerable technological developments that parallel major social advances in the region."

In ancient Egypt, use of arsenical bronze/copper is confirmed since the second phase of Naqada culture, and then used widely until the beginning of the New Kingdom, i.e. in the Egyptian Chalcolithic, Early and Middle Bronze Age, and within the same eras also in ancient Nubia. In the Old Kingdom, era of the largest pyramids' builders, the arsenical copper was used for the production of tools at Giza. Arsenical copper was also processed in the workshop uncovered at Giza's Heit el-Ghurab, "lost city of pyramid builders" from the reign of Menkaure. Egyptian and Nubian objects made of arsenical copper were identified in the collections in Brussels, and in Leipzig. In the Middle Kingdom, use of tin bronze increased in ancient Egypt and Nubia. One of the largest studies of such material was the research of the Egyptian and Nubian axe blades in the British Museum, and it provided comparable results. Similar situation can be observed in Middle Bronze Age Kerma. An intentional production of arsenical bronze, evidence of the cementation alloying process of copper with speiss inside ceramic crucibles, and a piece of speiss, were published from the Middle Kingdom archaeological contexts at Elephantine Island.

Sulfide deposits frequently are a mix of different metal sulfides, such as copper, zinc, silver, arsenic, mercury, iron and other metals. (Sphalerite (ZnS with more or less iron), for example, is not uncommon in copper sulfide deposits, and the metal smelted would be brass, which is both harder and more durable than copper.) The metals could theoretically be separated out, but the alloys resulting were typically much stronger than the metals individually.

The use of arsenical bronze spread along trade routes into northwestern China, to the Gansu–Qinghai region, with the Siba, Qijia and Tianshanbeilu cultures. However it is still unclear as to whether arsenical bronze artifacts were imported or made locally, although the latter is suspected as being more likely due to possible local exploitation of mineral resources. On the other hand, the artifacts show typological connections to the Eurasian steppe.

The Eneolithic period in Northern Italy, with the Remedello and Rinaldone cultures in 2800 to 2200 BC, saw the use of arsenical bronze. Indeed, it seems that arsenical bronze was the most common alloy in use in the Mediterranean basin at this time.

In South America, arsenical bronze was the predominant alloy in Ecuador and north and central Peru, because of the rich arsenic bearing ores present there. By contrast, the south and central Andes, southern Peru, Bolivia and parts of Argentina, were rich in the tin ore cassiterite and thus did not use arsenical bronze.

The Sican culture of northwestern coastal Peru is famous for its use of arsenical bronze during the period 900 to 1350 AD. Arsenical bronze co-existed with tin bronze in the Andes, probably due to its greater ductility which meant it could be easily hammered into thin sheets which were valued in local society.

== After the Bronze Age ==
The archaeological record in Egypt, Peru and the Caucasus suggests that arsenical bronze was produced for a time alongside tin bronze. At Tepe Yahya its use continued into the Iron Age for the manufacture of trinkets and decorative objects, thus demonstrating that there was not a simple succession of alloys over time, with superior new alloys replacing older ones. There are few real advantages metallurgically for the superiority of tin bronze, and early authors suggested that arsenical bronze was phased out due to its health effects. It is more likely that it was phased out in general use because alloying with tin gave castings which had similar strength to arsenical bronze but did not require further work-hardening to achieve useful strength. It is also probable that more certain results could be achieved with the use of tin, because it could be added directly to the copper in specific amounts, whereas the precise amount of arsenic being added was much harder to gauge due to the manufacturing process.

== Health effects ==
Arsenic is an element with a vaporization point of 615 °C, such that arsenical oxide will be lost from the melt before or during casting, and fumes from fire setting for mining and ore processing have long been known to attack the nervous system, eyes, lungs, and skin.

Chronic arsenic poisoning leads to peripheral neuropathy, which can cause weakness in the legs and feet. It has been speculated that this lay behind the legend of lame smiths in many cultures and myths, such as the Greek god Hephaestus. As Hephaestus was an iron-age smith, not a bronze-age smith, the connection would be one from ancient folk memory.

A well-preserved mummy of a man who lived around 3,200 BC found in the Ötztal Alps, popularly known as Ötzi, showed high levels of both copper particles and arsenic in his hair. This, along with Ötzi's copper axe blade, which is 99.7% pure copper, has led scientists to speculate that he was involved in copper smelting.

== Modern uses ==
Arsenical bronze has seen little use in the modern period. It appears that the closest equivalent goes by the name of arsenical copper, defined as copper with under 0.5% arsenic by mass, below the accepted percentage in archaeological artifacts. The presence of 0.5% arsenic in copper lowers the electrical conductivity to 34% of that of pure copper, and even as little as 0.05% decreases it by 15%.

== See also ==
- Arsenical copper
- Arsenical brass
