= Chaleh Murt, Tehran =

Chaleh Murt چاله مورت
- Village
- Location within Iran
- Coordinates: 35°20′00″N 51°45′00″E
- Country: Iran
- Province: Tehran
- County: Pishva
- Bakhsh: Jalilabad
- Rural District: Tarand

Population (2006)
  - Total: 29
- Time zone: UTC+3:30 (IRST)
  - Summer (DST): UTC+4:30 (IRDT)

Chaleh Murt (Persian: چاله مورت, also Romanized as Chāleh Mūrt) is a village in Tarand Rural District, Jalilabad District, Pishva County, Tehran Province, Iran. At the 2006 census, its population was 29, in 7 families.
