= Sar Gol =

Sar Gol or Sargol (Persian: سرگل) may refer to:

- Sar Gol Rural District, Golestan province
- Sar Gol, Hormozgan, Hormozgan province
- Sar Gol, Sistan and Baluchestan, Sistan and Baluchestan province
- Sar Gol, Tehran, Tehran province
