= Qasemabad, Pishva =

Village in Tehran province, Iran

Qasemabad Persian: قاسم اباد
- Village
- Location within Iran
- Coordinates: 35°20′08″N 51°42′41″E
- Country: Iran
- Province: Tehran
- County: Pishva
- District: Central
- Rural District: Asgariyeh

Population (2016)
  - Total: 559
- Time zone: UTC+3:30 (IRST)

Qasemabad (Persian: قاسم اباد) (Note: Also romanized as Qāsemābād; also known as Qāsimābād) is a village in Asgariyeh Rural District of the Central District in Pishva County, Tehran province, Iran.

== Demographics ==
=== Population ===
At the time of the 2006 National Census, the village's population was 818 in 170 households, when it was in the former Pishva District of Varamin County. The following census in 2011 counted 534 people in 147 households, by which time the district had been separated from the county in the establishment of Pishva County. The rural district was transferred to the new Central District. The 2016 census measured the population of the village as 559 people in 141 households.
