= Jalilabad District =

Jalilabad District may refer to:

- Jalilabad District (Azerbaijan)
- Jalilabad District (Iran)
- Jalilabad Rural District
