= Palang Darreh =

Palang Darreh or Palangdarreh (Persian: پلنگ دره) may refer to:

- Palang Darreh, Fuman, Gilan Province
- Palang Darreh, Rudbar, Gilan Province
- Palang Darreh, Mazandaran
- Palang Darreh, North Khorasan
- Palang Darreh, Tehran
