= Tehran Plain =

The Tehran Plain is a landscape formation in Iran delimited by the adjacent Alborz Mountain range. It is a site of prehistoric archaeological and geoscientific interest. Numerous faults and deformed quaternary units in the Tehran plain prove it is a region of ancient tectonic activity.

== Geology ==
The Tehran Plain is a landscape formation in Iran. It consists of Neogene and Quaternary sediments.

The North Tehran Fault thrust up Eocene rocks of the Alborz Mountain range. Geomorphologically three different zones can be described: In the western part, the plain has been deformed by thrusting, as can be seen by a segmented and internally deformed anticline and old and diverted channels on both sides. This process has been dated at possibly after 25,000 years. In the central part of the plain, which lies below the megacity of Tehran, thrusting and left-lateral strike-slip faulting has caused several uplifted fluvial terraces, reminiscent of a transpressional structure of uncertain age, possibly ~195,000 years, i.e. Pleistocene.

In the Eastern part, ramp-structures are ~195,000y-old, of middle Pleistocene.

== Archaeology ==
A channel for artificial water management on the Tehran Plain dating from the Late Neolithic was described in 2009, suggesting that farmers at Tepe Pardis in Iran irrigated crops in the 6th millennium. This corresponds to findings from Choga Mami in Iraq.

Stone tool finds on the Tehran Plain from the late Neolithic through to Early Chalcolithic show that stone blade production was organised around craft specialists and also part-time blade producers within the household economy and the craft collapsed with increasing use of bronze.

Study of a "landlord village" in Qasemabad, Pishva (also spelled Kazemabad) on the plain has allowed understanding the social and economic organisation of much of Iran's rural population as it was rooted in the early Islamic period until the 1963 White Revolution.

== Water ==
Groundwater sampling in southern parts of Tehran plain in 2012 found more than half of the samples unsuitable for drinking and agricultural use because of high levels of salinity.
