= Shrine of Jafar al-Kazim (Pishva) =

Emamzadeh Jafar
- امامزاده جعفر
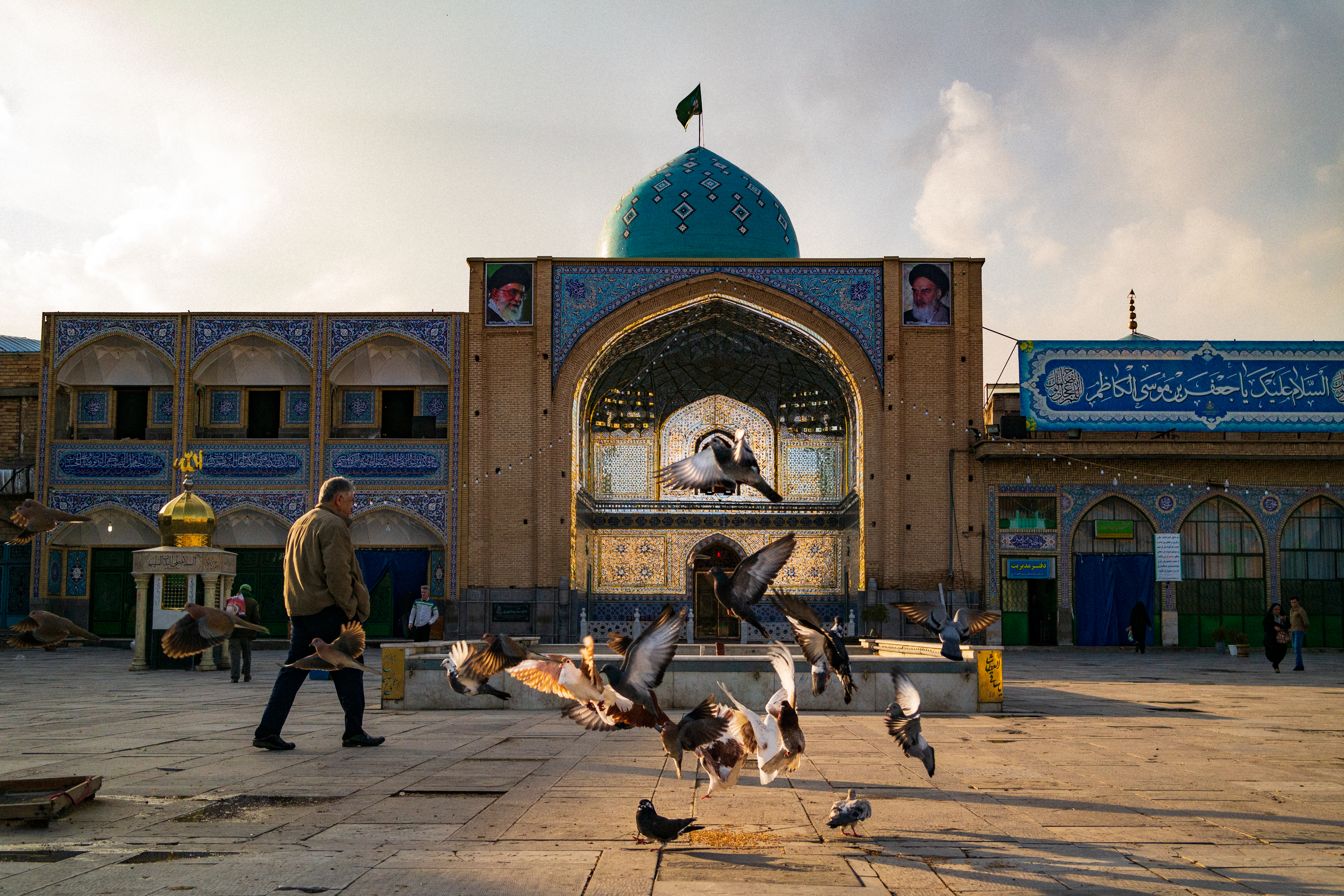

- Location within Iran

Religion
- Affiliation: Shia Islam
- Sect: Ja'fari
- Province: Tehran

Location
- Location: Pishva
- Country: Iran
- Interactive map of Emamzadeh Jafar

Architecture
- Style: Safavid

Specifications
- Dome height (outer): 21 m
- Dome dia. (outer): 9.5 m
- Shrine: 1
- Materials: Brick, Tile, Mirror

Website

Iran National Heritage List
- Official name: Emamzadeh Jafar
- Type: Emamzadeh
- Designated: 1938
- Reference no.: 319
- Conservation organization: Cultural Heritage, Handicrafts and Tourism Organization of Iran

The Shrine of Ja'far al-Kadhim (also known as Imamzadeh Ja'far in Pishva) is a significant religious site located in the city of Pishva, Tehran Province, Iran. It is dedicated to Ja'far ibn Musa al-Kadhim, the son of the seventh Shia Imam, Musa al-Kadhim. The shrine is an important pilgrimage destination for Shia Muslims and attracts visitors year-round, especially during significant religious occasions.

== Genealogy and Historical Significance ==
Ja'far al-Kadhim, the son of Imam Musa al-Kadhim, was a revered figure in Shia Islam, and his burial site in Pishva holds cultural and religious importance. It is believed that Ja'far al-Kadhim died in the region and was buried there in 202 AH.

== Architecture ==
The shrine is built in the Safavid architectural style, with intricate mirror work, decorative tiles, and Quranic inscriptions. The shrine's dome is 21 meters in height and has a diameter of 9.5 meters, making it a prominent feature of the Pishva landscape.

== Rituals and Events ==
The shrine is known for its annual "Ghabarroubi" (dust cleaning) ceremony, an important religious ritual that attracts large crowds. The ceremony symbolizes respect and devotion to the shrine and its spiritual significance.

== Religious and Cultural Role ==
The shrine plays an integral role in the religious and cultural life of the region, serving as a site for prayers, pilgrimages, and cultural events. It hosts large gatherings during religious occasions such as Eid al-Ghadir, Ashura, and Nowruz.

== Renovation and Preservation ==
In 2024, a major renovation project was launched to preserve and enhance the shrine's structure. The project, with a budget of one billion Iranian Tomans, includes improvements to the dome and surrounding areas.

== National Heritage Status ==
The Shrine of Ja'far al-Kadhim in Pishva was designated as a national heritage site in Iran on November 12, 1938. This status underscores its historical, cultural, and religious significance in Iran.

== See also ==
- Musa al-Kadhim
- Ali al-Ridha
- Shia Pilgrimages in Iran
- Sacred Sites in Iran
