= Shotor Khvar =

Shotor Khvar and Shotor Khar or Shuturkhwar (Persian: شترخوار) may refer to:

- Shotor Khvar, Pishva
- Shotor Khvar, Robat Karim
