= Jalilabad, Pishva =

City in Tehran province, Iran

Jalilabad Persian: جليل اباد
- City
- Location within Iran
- Coordinates: 35°20′36″N 51°47′11″E
- Country: Iran
- Province: Tehran
- County: Pishva
- District: Jalilabad
- Established as a city: 2019
- Elevation: 970 m (3,180 ft)

Population (2016)
  - Total: 5,216
- Time zone: UTC+3:30 (IRST)

Jalilabad (Persian: جليل اباد) (Note: Also romanized as Jalīlābād; also known as Khalīlābād and Shahrak-e Jalīlābād) is a city in, and the capital of, Jalilabad District in Pishva County, Tehran province, Iran. It also serves as the administrative center for Jalilabad Rural District. (Note: Formerly Behnamsokhteh-e Jonubi Rural District)

== Demographics ==
=== Population ===
At the time of the 2006 National Census, Jalilabad's population was 5,520 in 1,322 households, when it was a village in Behnamsokhteh-e Jonubi Rural District (Note: Renamed Jalilabad Rural District) of the former Pishva District in Varamin County. The following census in 2011 counted 5,379 people in 1,429 households, by which time the district had been separated from the county in the establishment of Pishva County. The rural district was transferred to the new Jalilabad District and renamed Jalilabad Rural District. The 2016 census measured the population of the village as 5,216 people in 1,492 households. It was the most populous village in its rural district.

Jalilabad was converted to a city in 2019.
