= Pishva Rural District =

Rural district in Tehran province, Iran

Pishva Rural District Persian: دهستان پيشوا
- Rural District
- Location within Iran
- Coordinates: 35°18′N 51°41′E
- Country: Iran
- Province: Tehran
- County: Pishva
- District: Central
- Established: 2010
- Capital: Qaleh Sin

Population (2016)
  - Total: 4,240
- Time zone: UTC+3:30 (IRST)

Pishva Rural District (Persian: دهستان پيشوا) is in the Central District of Pishva County, Tehran province, Iran. Its capital is the village of Qaleh Sin.

== History ==
In 2010, Pishva District was separated from Varamin County in the establishment of Pishva County, and Pishva Rural District was created in the new Central District.

== Demographics ==
=== Population ===
At the time of the 2011 census, the rural district's population was 3,892 inhabitants in 992 households. The 2016 census measured the population of the rural district as 4,240 in 1,207 households. The most populous of its eight villages was Qaleh Sin, with 2,892 people.

=== Other villages in the rural district ===
- Dar-e Bala
- Ebrahimabad
- Fathabad
- Moinabad
- Qeshlaq-e Moinabad
