= Harald Hauptmann =

German archaeologist (1936–2018)

Harald Hauptmann (19 April 1936 – 2 August 2018) was a German archaeologist known for his excavation work in east and southeast Turkey at sites such as Norşuntepe. He also studied of pre-Islamic Pakistan. He was a professor at the University of Heidelberg and a foreign-member of the Serbian Academy of Sciences and Arts.

Hauptmann was born in Ratkau, Kreis Troppau, in the former Czechoslovakia.
