= Değirmentepe =

Archaeological site in Turkey

Değirmentepe or Değirmentepe Hüyük is an archaeological site which is located at 50 km north of the river Euphrates and at 24 km in the northeast of Malatya province in eastern Anatolia. It is now submerged in the reservoir area of the Karakaya and Atatürk dams. Rescue excavations were undertaken in 1978 under the supervision of Ufuk Esin of Istanbul University and interrupted in 1989 by flooding of the dams.

== History ==
Four archaeological layers whose dates are determined by techniques such as C14 and traces of fusion have been discovered in this mound:

1. Middle Ages (late Roman-Byzantine period)
2. Iron Age (1000 BCE)
3. Bronze Age ancient I (Karaz or Khirbet Kerak culture, end of 4th millennium-beginning of 3rd millennium BCE)
4. Chalcolithic Age (Ubaid period, second half of 5th millennium BCE.)

=== Chalcolithic ===
The Chalcolithic Değirmentepe level of Ubaid-4 of the second half of the Vth millennium BCE, of which the sites of Tülintepe, Seyh Hüyük, and Kurban Hüyük are contemporary, contain skeletons of adolescents with skull deformed. The remains of this cultural phase belonging to the Chalcolithic are relatively well preserved. However, serious damage caused by occasional flooding of the Euphrates did occur, especially on architectural structures and the cemetery. Cranial deformities are not observed on human remains discovered and identified in Iron Age periods and medieval levels from Değrentepe.

The Chalcolithic period of this ancient village is characterized by rectangular mud brick houses that communicate with each other. We see the appearance of domestic animals such as dogs, sheep, goats, pigs, and Bovinae than at the beginning of the Chalcolithic. barley, wheat, oats, and peas were the most commonly cultivated plants.

Many ceramics characteristic of Ubaid culture have been found at the site. Archaeologists have discovered 450 sealings there which indicate intensive commercial activities, and production management.

==== Metallurgy ====
Strong evidence of metallurgical activities has been revealed in levels 9 to 6, dating to the Ubaid period, and especially in level 7 (4166 +/- 170 cal BC). Hearths or natural draft furnaces, slag, ore, and pigment had been recovered throughout the site. This was in the context of architectural complexes typical of southern Mesopotamian architecture.

Unusually, the metallurgical activities at the site appear to have been limited to the melting and casting of copper objects. Arsenical copper objects were clearly manufactured on-site, yet the technological aspects of these productions remain unclear. This is because the primary smelting of ore seems to have been undertaken elsewhere, perhaps already at the mining sites. So questions remain as to whether or not arsenic was already present in the ores or added later.

In contrast, the related Norşuntepe site provides a better context of production and demonstrates that some form of arsenic alloying was indeed taking place by the 4th millennium BC. Since the slag identified at Norşuntepe contains no arsenic, arsenic was added separately.

== See also ==
- Aratashen
- Prehistory of the Levant
- Prehistory of Mesopotamia
