= Radkov (Opava District) =

- Municipality
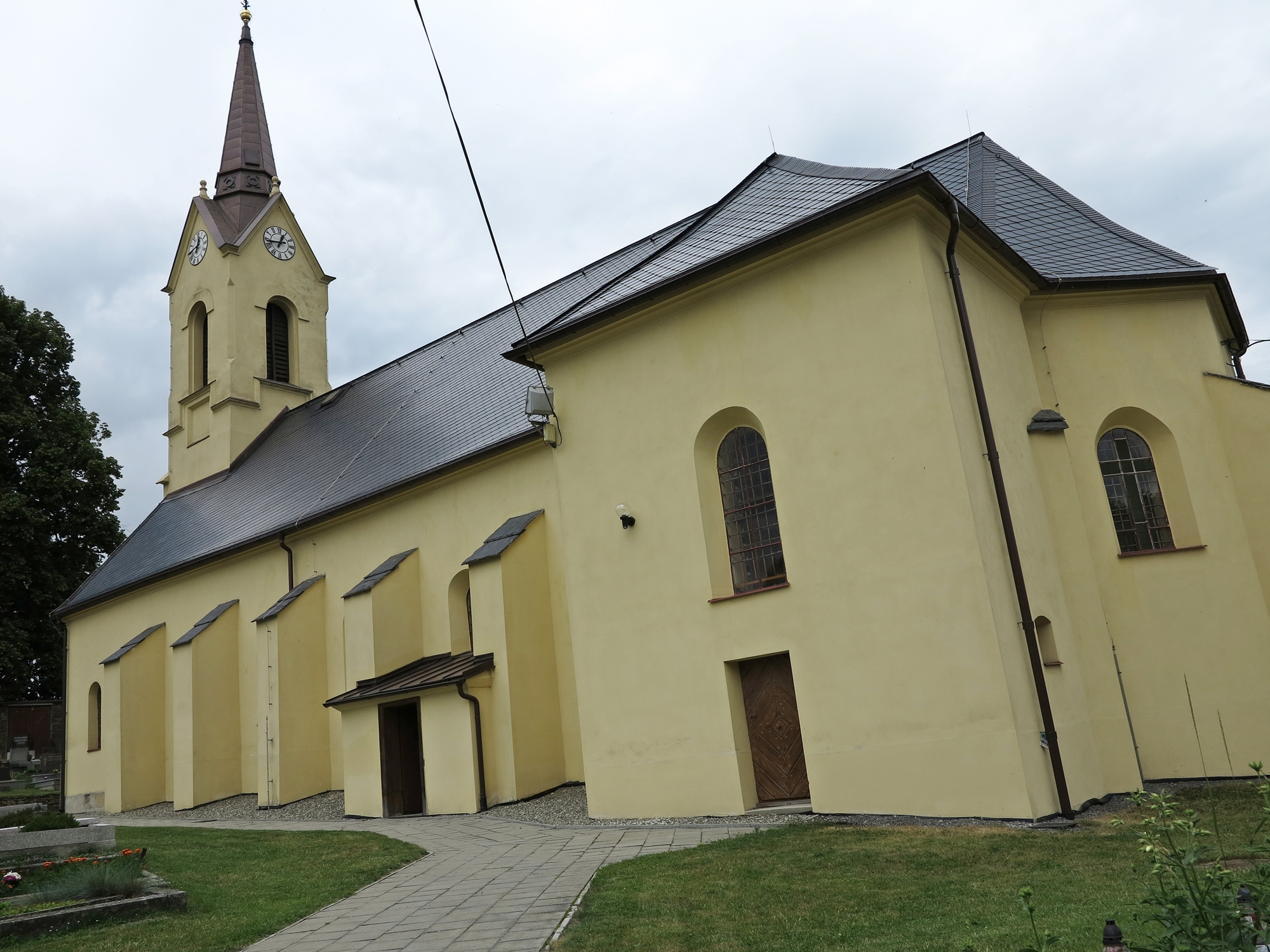
- Church of the Nativity of the Virgin Mary

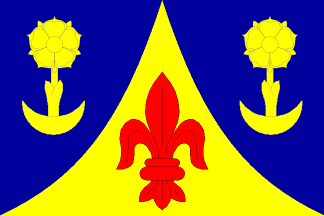
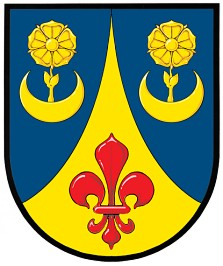
- Flag Coat of arms

- Location in the Czech Republic
- Coordinates: 49°49′32″N 17°46′13″E
- Country: Czech Republic
- Region: Moravian-Silesian Region
- District: Opava
- First mentioned: 1377

Area
  - Total: 15.37 km^{2} (5.93 sq mi)
- Elevation: 474 m (1,555 ft)

Population (2026-01-01)
  - Total: 497
  - Density: 32.3/km^{2} (83.7/sq mi)
- Time zone: UTC+1 (CET)
  - Summer (DST): UTC+2 (CEST)
- Postal code: 747 84
- Website: www.obecradkov.cz

Radkov (German: Ratkau) is a municipality and village in Opava District in the Moravian-Silesian Region of the Czech Republic. It has about 500 inhabitants.

== History ==
The first written mention of Radkov is from 1377.

== Demographics ==
Historical population
Year	Pop.	±%
1869	1,002	—
1880	1,064	+6.2%
1890	1,152	+8.3%
1900	1,078	−6.4%
1910	1,089	+1.0%
1921	1,013	−7.0%
1930	957	−5.5%
1950	574	−40.0%
1961	669	+16.6%
1970	739	+10.5%
1980	588	−20.4%
1991	506	−13.9%
2001	508	+0.4%
2011	490	−3.5%
2021	501	+2.2%
Source: Censuses

== Notable people ==
- Harald Hauptmann (1936–2018), German archaeologist
