= Chalcolithic =

Prehistoric period: Copper Age

Copper Age
- c. 6500 BC – c. 3000 BC
Stone Age	Bronze Age
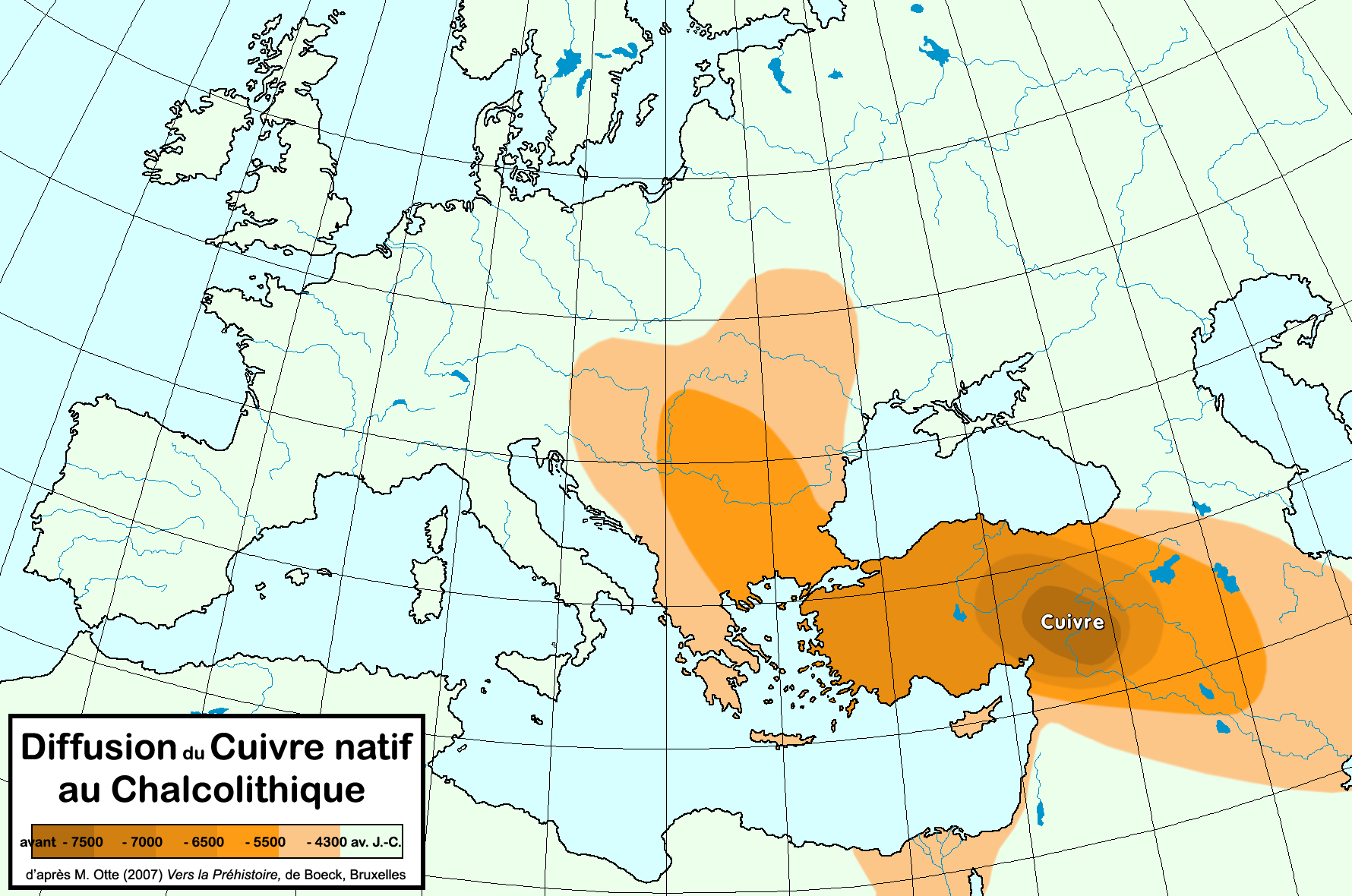
- Diffusion of copper metallurgy in Asia Minor and Eastern Europe—the darkest areas are the oldest.
- Location: Africa; Asia; Europe; Americas
- Key events: Extensive copper metallurgy

The Chalcolithic (/ˈkælkəˌlɪθɪk/ KAL-kə-LI-thik) (also called the Copper Age and Eneolithic) (Note: Chalcolithic (English: /ˌkælkəˈlɪθɪk/; from Ancient Greek: χαλκός khalkós, "copper" and λίθος líthos, "stone"); Eneolithic, from Latin aeneus "of copper") was an archaeological period characterized by the increasing use of smelted copper. It followed the Neolithic and preceded the Bronze Age. It occurred at different periods in different areas, but was absent in some parts of the world, such as Russia, where there was no well-defined Copper Age between the Stone and Bronze Ages. Stone tools were still predominantly used during this period.

The Chalcolithic covers both the early cold working (hammering) of near-pure copper ores, as exhibited by the likes of the North American Great Lakes Old Copper complex, from around 6,500 BC, through the later copper smelting cultures. The archaeological site of Belovode, on Rudnik mountain in Serbia, has the world's oldest securely dated evidence of copper smelting at high temperature, from c. 5,000 BC. The transition from Copper Age to Bronze Age in Europe occurred between the late 5th and the late 3rd millennium BC. In the Ancient Near East the Copper Age covered about the same period, beginning in the late 5th millennium BC and lasting for about a millennium before it gave rise to the Early Bronze Age.

A study in the journal Antiquity from 2013 reporting the discovery of a tin bronze foil from the Pločnik archaeological site dated to c. 4,650 BC, as well as 14 other artefacts from Bulgaria and Serbia dated to before 4,000 BC, showed that early tin bronze was more common than previously thought and developed independently in Europe 1,500 years before the first tin bronze alloys in the Near East. In Britain, the Chalcolithic is a short period between about 2,500 and 2,200 BC, characterized by the first appearance of objects of copper and gold, a new ceramic culture and the immigration of Bell Beaker culture people, heralding the end of the local late Neolithic.

== Terminology ==
The multiple names result from multiple definitions of the period. Originally, the term Bronze Age meant that either copper or bronze was being used as the chief hard substance for the manufacture of tools and weapons. Ancient writers, who provided the essential cultural references for educated people during the 19th century, used the same name for both copper and bronze-using ages.

The concept of the Copper Age was put forward by Hungarian scientist Ferenc Pulszky in the 1870s, when, on the basis of the significant number of large copper objects unearthed within the Carpathian Basin, he suggested that the previous threefold division of the Prehistoric Age – the Stone, Bronze and Iron Ages – should be further divided with the introduction of the Copper Age.

In 1881, John Evans recognized that use of copper often preceded the use of bronze, and distinguished between a transitional Copper Age and the Bronze Age proper. He did not include the transitional period in the Bronze Age, but described it separately from the customary stone/bronze/iron system, at the Bronze Age's beginning. He did not, however, present it as a fourth age but chose to retain the tripartite system.

In 1884, Gaetano Chierici, perhaps following the lead of Evans, renamed it in Italian as the eneo-litica, or "bronze–stone" transition. The phrase was never intended to mean that the period was the only one in which both bronze and stone were used. The Copper Age features the use of copper, excluding bronze; moreover, stone continued to be used throughout both the Bronze Age and the Iron Age. The part -litica simply names the Stone Age as the point from which the transition began and is not another -lithic age.

Subsequently, British scholars used either Evans's "Copper Age" or the term "Eneolithic" (or Æneolithic), a translation of Chierici's eneo-litica. After several years, a number of complaints appeared in the literature that "Eneolithic" seemed to the untrained eye to be produced from e-neolithic, "outside the Neolithic", clearly not a definitive characterization of the Copper Age. Around 1900, many writers began to substitute Chalcolithic for Eneolithic, to avoid the false segmentation. The term chalcolithic is a combination of two words- Chalco+Lithic, derived from the Greek words "khalkos" meaning "copper", and "líthos" meaning "stone".

But "chalcolithic" could also mislead: For readers unfamiliar with the Italian language, chalcolithic seemed to suggest another -lithic age, paradoxically part of the Stone Age despite the use of copper. Today, Copper Age, Eneolithic, and Chalcolithic are used synonymously (Note: Middle Eastern archaeologists use "Chalcolithic" regularly, whereas the literature of European archaeology generally avoids the use of "Chalcolithic": The term "Copper Age" is preferred for Western Europe, "Eneolithic" for Eastern Europe. "Chalcolithic" is not generally used by British prehistorians, who disagree as to whether it is appropriate in the British context.) to mean Evans's original definition of Copper Age.

== Regions ==
=== Near East ===
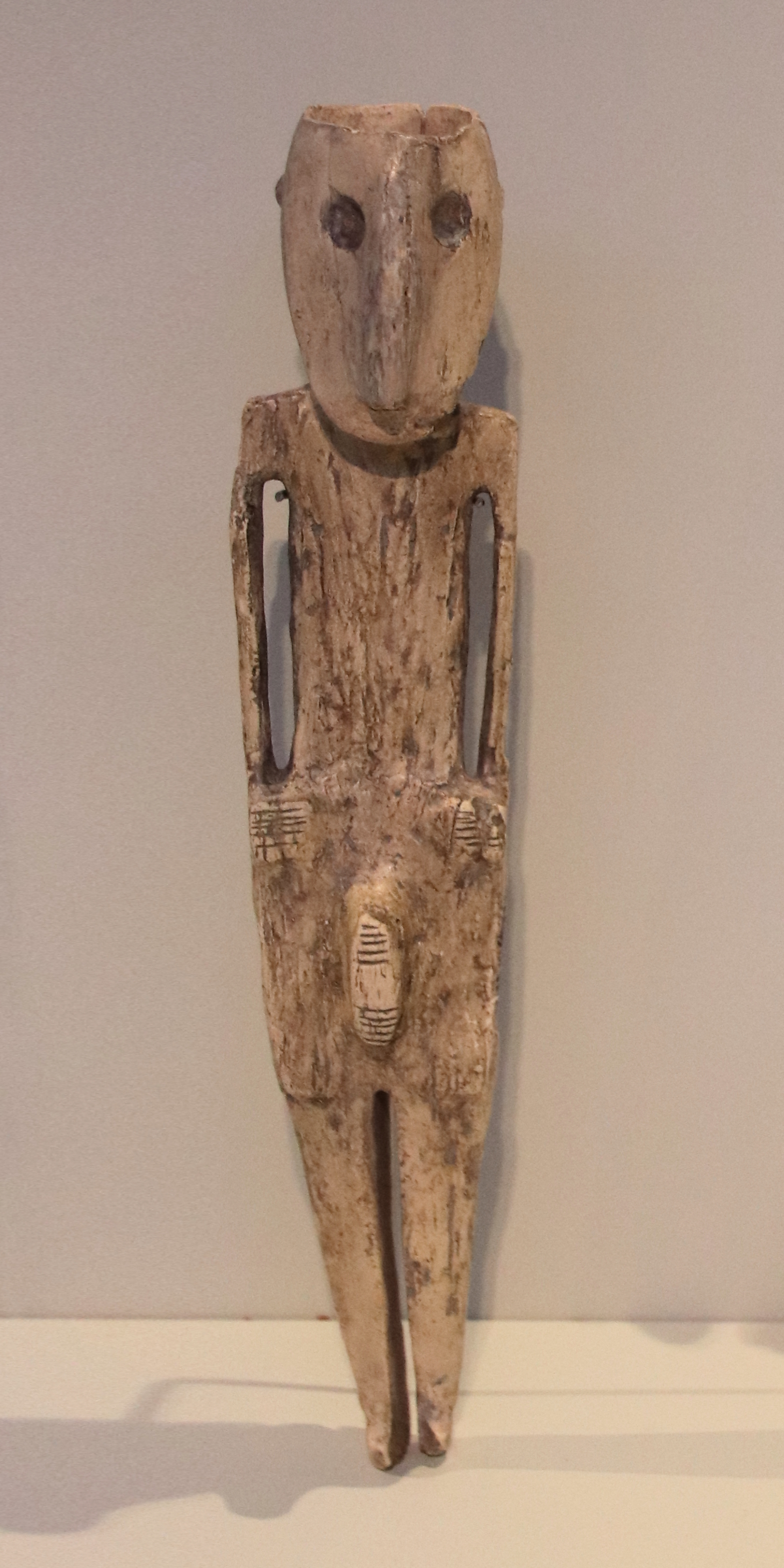
Levant Chalcolithic male figurine, 4500–3500 BC

The emergence of metallurgy may have occurred first in the Fertile Crescent.

Lead may have been the first ore that humans smelted, since it can be easily obtained by heating galena.

Possible early examples of lead smelting, supported by the extreme rarity of native lead, include: lead beads, found on Level IX of Chatal/Çatal Hüyük in central Anatolia, though they might be made of galena, cerussite, or metallic lead, and accordingly might or might not be evidence of early smelting; a lead bead, found in a GK59 group test square in the 4th level of Jarmo, dated to the 7th millennium BCE, though it is small enough that its human usage is doubtful; a lead bracelet, found in level XII of Yarim Tepe I, dated to the 6th millennium BC; a small cone-shaped piece of lead, found in the "Burnt House" in TT6 at Arpachiyah, dated to the Halaf period or slightly later than the Yarim Tepe bracelet; and more.

Copper smelting is also documented at this site at about the same time period (soon after 6000 BC). However, the use of lead seems to precede copper smelting. Early metallurgy is also documented at the nearby site of Tell Maghzaliyah, which seems to be dated even earlier, and completely lacks pottery.

The Timna Valley contains evidence of copper mining in 7000–5000 BC. The process of transition from Neolithic to Chalcolithic in the Middle East is characterized in archaeological stone tool assemblages by a decline in high quality raw material procurement and use. This dramatic shift is seen throughout the region, including the Tehran Plain, Iran. Here, analysis of six archaeological sites determined a marked downward trend in not only material quality, but also in aesthetic variation in the lithic artefacts. Fazeli & Coningham use these results as evidence of the loss of craft specialisation caused by increased use of copper tools.

The Tehran Plain findings illustrate the effects of the introduction of copper working technologies on the in-place systems of lithic craft specialists and raw materials. Networks of exchange and specialized processing and production that had evolved during the Neolithic seem to have collapsed by the Middle Chalcolithic (c. 4500–3500 BC) and been replaced by the use of local materials by a primarily household-based production of stone tools.

Archaeological evidence from the village of Una in the eastern Caucasus indicates copper mining activities during the Chalcolithic and Bronze Ages.

Arsenical copper or bronze was produced at two ancient sites in eastern Turkey, Norşuntepe in Elazığ Province and Değirmentepe in Malatya Province, around 4200 BC. According to Boscher (2016), hearths or natural draft furnaces, slag, ore, and pigment had been recovered throughout these sites. This was in the context of Ubaid period architectural complexes typical of southern Mesopotamian architecture. Norşuntepe site demonstrates that some form of arsenic alloying was indeed taking place by the 4th millennium BC. Since the slag identified at Norşuntepe contains no arsenic, this means that arsenic in some form was added separately.

=== Europe ===
A copper axe found at Prokuplje, Serbia contains the oldest securely dated evidence of copper-making, c. 5500 BC (7,500 years ago). The find in June 2010 extends the known record of copper smelting by about 800 years, and suggests that copper smelting may have been invented in separate parts of Asia and Europe at that time rather than spreading from a single source.

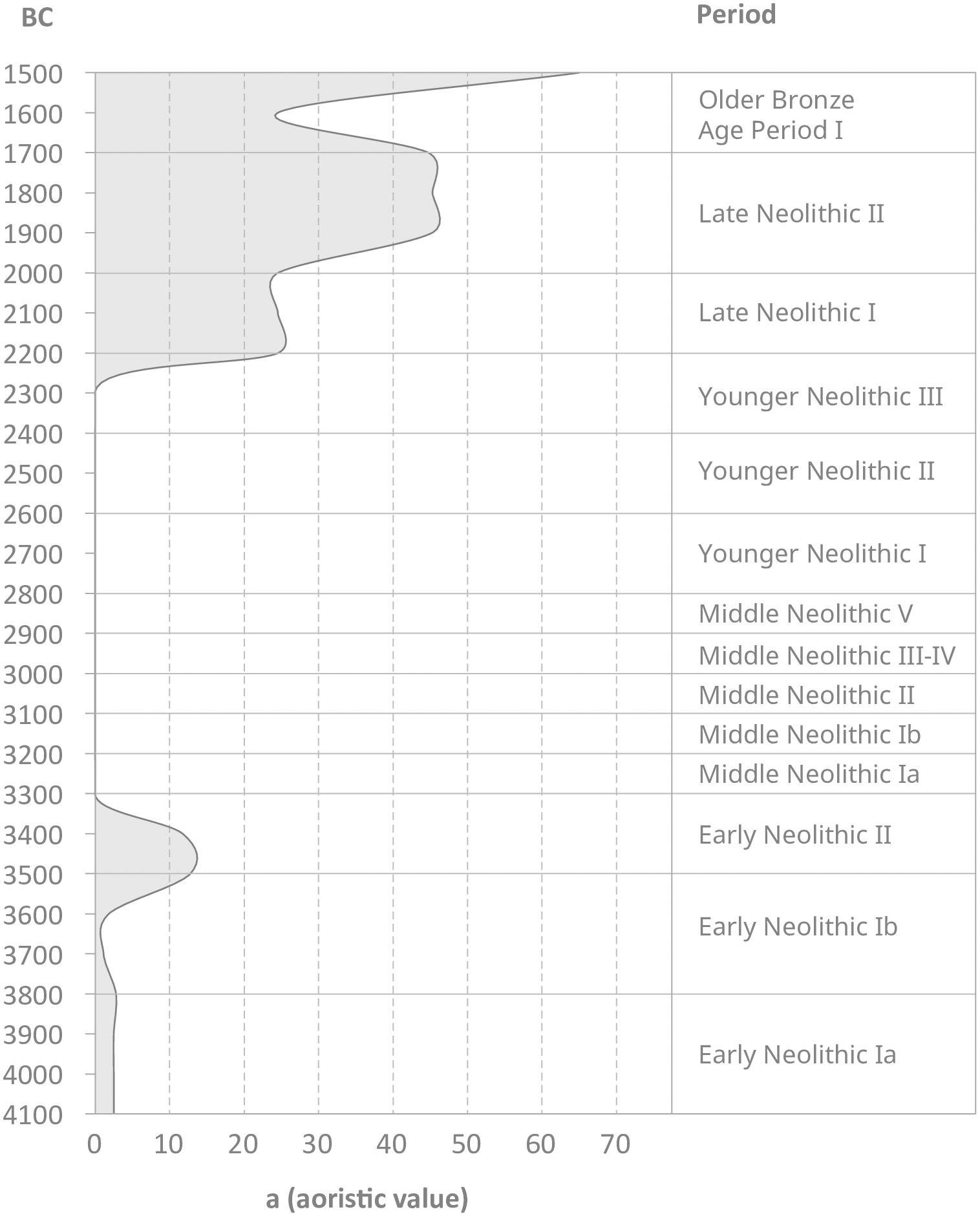
Number of metal artefacts found in northern Germany. After a first peak in the late fourth millennium BC, copper disappeared. It only reappeared 1,000 years later at the beginning of the Bronze Age.

In Britain and central and northern Europe a Chalcolithic period has never been defined. However, copper artefacts have been found in archaeological groups. Copper artefacts found in northern Germany and Denmark date from between 4000 and 3300 BC, with most finds dating from 3500 - 3300 BC. They belong to the Funnel Beaker group. The copper was mined in Serbian mines, as researchers from Kiel have recently discovered.

Knowledge of the use of copper was far more widespread than the metal itself. Many European archaeological Cultures used stone axes modeled on copper axes, even with moulding carved in the stone, such as the Battle Axe culture or the late Funnel Beaker Culture. Ötzi the Iceman, who was found in the Ötztal Alps in 1991 and whose remains have been dated to about 3300 BC, was found with a Mondsee copper axe.

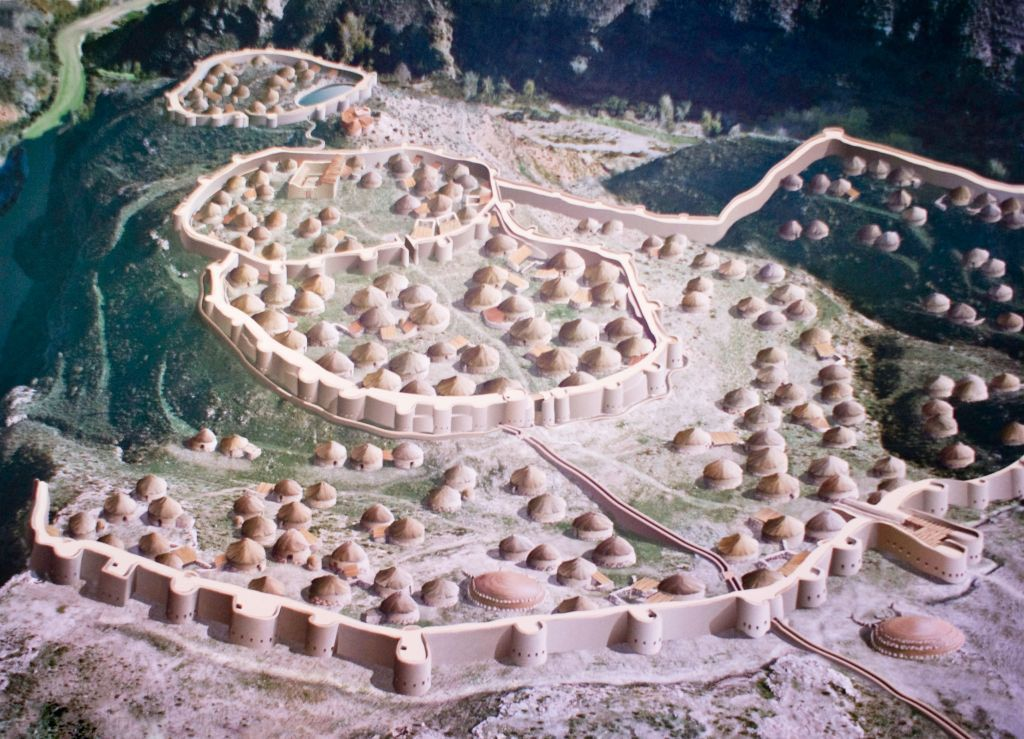
A painting of a Copper Age walled settlement, Los Millares, Spain

Examples of Chalcolithic cultures in Europe include Vila Nova de São Pedro and Los Millares on the Iberian Peninsula. Pottery of the Beaker people has been found at both sites, dating to several centuries after copper-working began there. The Beaker culture appears to have spread copper and bronze technologies in Europe, along with Indo-European languages. In Britain, copper was used between the 25th and 22nd centuries BC, but some archaeologists do not recognise a British Chalcolithic because production and use was on a small scale.

=== South Asia ===
Ceramic similarities between the Indus Valley Civilisation, southern Turkmenistan, and northern Iran during 4300–3300 BC of the Chalcolithic period suggest considerable mobility and trade.

The term "Chalcolithic" has also been used in the context of the South Asian Stone Age.

In Bhirrana, the earliest Indus civilization site, copper bangles and arrowheads were found. The inhabitants of Mehrgarh in present-day Pakistan fashioned tools with local copper ore between 7000 and 3300 BC.

The Nausharo site was a pottery workshop in the province of Balochistan, Pakistan, that dates to 4,500 years ago; 12 blades and blade fragments were excavated there. These blades are 12–18 cm (5–7 in) long, 1.2–2.0 cm (0.5–0.8 in) wide, and relatively thin. Archaeological experiments show that these blades were made with a copper indenter and functioned as a potter's tool to trim and shape unfired pottery. Petrographic analysis indicates local pottery manufacturing, but also reveals the existence of a few exotic black-slipped pottery items from the Indus Valley.

In India, Chalcolithic culture flourished in mainly four farming communities – Ahar or Banas, Kayatha, Malwa, and Jorwe. These communities had some common traits like painted pottery and use of copper, but they had a distinct ceramic design tradition. Banas culture (2000–1600 BC) had ceramics with red, white, and black design. Kayatha culture (2450–1700 BC) had ceramics painted with brown colored design. Malwa culture (1900–1400 BC) had profusely decorated pottery with red or black colored design. Jorwe culture (1500–900 BC) had ceramics with matte surface and black-on-red design.

Pandu Rajar Dhibi (2000–1600 BC) is a Chalcolithic site in the eastern part of the Indian subcontinent. It is located on the south bank of Ajay River in West Bengal. Blackware, painted Koshi ware, pottery, various ornaments made of pearl and copper, various types of tools, pieces of fabric woven from Shimul cotton thread, human and various animal skeletons, burnt clay fragments have been found at the site.

In March 2018, archaeologists had discovered three carts and copper artifacts including weapons dating to 1800 BC in Sanauli village of Uttar Pradesh. The artifacts belongs to Ochre Coloured Pottery culture.

=== Americas ===
In the Archaeology of the Americas, a five-period system is conventionally used which does not include metal ages, though metalworking technology did precede European contact in some areas.

Andean civilizations in South America appear to have independently invented copper smelting.

The term "Chalcolithic" is also applied to American civilizations that already used copper and copper alloys thousands of years before Europeans immigrated. Besides cultures in the Andes and Mesoamerica, the Old Copper complex mined and fabricated copper as tools, weapons, and personal ornaments in an area centered in the upper Great Lakes region (present-day Michigan and Wisconsin).

The evidence of smelting or alloying that has been found in North America is subject to some dispute and a common assumption by archaeologists is that objects were cold-worked into shape. Artifacts from some of these sites have been dated to 6500–1000 BC, making them some of the oldest Chalcolithic sites in the world. Some archaeologists find artifactual and structural evidence of casting by Hopewellian and Mississippian peoples to be demonstrated in the archaeological record.

=== East Asia ===
A knife from the Majiayao culture found in Linjia, Gansu dated to between 2900 to 2740 BC is earliest copper alloy artifact of 'secure stratigraphic provenience' from China. However, a 2016 journal article concluded from the isotopes, lack of nearby ore deposits, and lack of associated smelting site that the dagger was most likely imported.

By the late third millennium BC established centers of copper and bronze metallurgy had emerged in northwest China associated with the Zongri (2500 BC), Machang (2300 BC) and Qijia (2300 BC) archeological sites.

Much earlier copper alloy artifacts from Jiangzhai have been claimed but the brass found at the site has been described as "very suspicious", with suggestions that it resulted from accidental mixing from the upper layers of sediment. Evidence from only two pieces of metal was deemed far from sufficient to establish the initial stage of the Chinese Metal Age, while the absence of comparable brass finds for thousands of years afterward has also been cited as grounds for questioning the finds.

=== Sub-Saharan Africa ===
In the region of the Aïr Mountains, Niger, independent copper smelting developed between 3000 and 2500 BC. Their metallurgical technologies would continue to develop into 1500 BC and onward.

== See also ==
- Arsenical bronze
- Proto-city
