= Norşuntepe =

Archaeological mound in Turkey

- Location within Turkey Location within Near East
- 38°37′08″N 39°28′12″E
- Type: tell, cemetery, human settlement
- Periods: Chalcolithic, Early Bronze Age, Early Iron Age, Middle Ages
- Location: Elazığ Province, Turkey

Site notes
- Elevation: 855 m (2,805 ft)
- Height: 35 m (115 ft)
- Length: 800 m (2,600 ft)
- Width: 600 m (2,000 ft)
- Area: 8.2 ha (20 acres)
- Excavation dates: 1968–1974
- Archaeologists: Harald Hauptmann
- Condition: flooded

Norşuntepe is a tell, or archaeological settlement mound, in Elazığ Province (Turkey). The site was occupied between the Chalcolithic and Iron Age and is now partially submerged by Lake Keban. It was excavated between 1968 and 1974.

== The site and its environment ==
Before it was flooded, Norşuntepe was located on the Altınova Plain near the mouth of the Murat River (downstream from the town of Palu, Elazığ). It is now partially submerged by the reservoir created by the Keban Dam; its top is still above the water level. The site consists of a central hill or "acropolis" measuring 140 by 100 metres (460 by 330 ft) and 35 metres (115 ft) high, making it the largest tell in the area. The central hill is surrounded by lower terraces encompassing an area of 800 by 600 metres (2,600 by 2,000 ft).

== History ==
Norşuntepe was occupied from the Chalcolithic to the Iron Age. The excavators have recognized 40 different occupation levels ranging in date from the fifth millennium BC to ca. 600 BC. Its occupation levels overlap to a large degree with those excavated at nearby Arslantepe.

=== Chalcolithic ===
The Chalcolithic occupation at Norşuntepe can be divided in 3 phases. The oldest Phase I dates to the Middle Chalcolithic and included Ubaid-type pottery. Phase II represents the Late Chalcolithic and during its final levels, more complex architecture appeared in the excavated area.

==== Phase II: Metallurgy and arsenical bronze ====
Also during Phase II, copper and arsenical bronze production was practiced at the site.

Norşuntepe provides first clear and unambiguous evidence of arsenical bronze production in this general area before the 4th millennium. It demonstrates that some form of arsenic alloying was being deliberately practised. Since the slag identified at Norşuntepe contains no arsenic, this means that arsenic-bearing materials were added separately. The evidence was discovered at the levels with Ubaid style ceramics, where also were found a number of structures related to the Mesopotamian architectural traditions. A related site in the area from the same time period is Değirmentepe, where arsenic-bronze was also produced around 4200 BC.

==== Phase III ====
The final Chalcolithic phases were characterized by small-scale single-room houses. Radiocarbon dating from the different Chalcolithic levels provided dates between 4300 and 3800 BC.

=== Early Bronze ===
After a hiatus, Norşuntepe was again occupied during the Early Bronze Age. The site reached a size of 3.2 hectares in the Early Bronze I and II periods and then shrank to 0.8 hectares in EB III. During this period, the site was surrounded by a mudbrick city wall built on a stone foundation. There is evidence for copper production and some sort of palace or large, central building appears at the site in the final phases. In terms of material culture and architecture, there are clear parallels with Transcaucasia, and the Kura–Araxes culture. The latest Early Bronze Age phase in Norşuntepe ends in fire.

=== Middle Bronze ===
The Middle Bronze Age settlement is smaller than its precursor and no evidence for a palace has been found.

=== Late Bronze ===
==== Mitanni period ====
The Late Bronze Age remains at Norşuntepe was heavily disturbed by later Iron Age activity, but some larger buildings have been excavated. This region would have been in the Mitanni Empire, the source of copper.

==== Hittite period ====
From around 1350 BC onwards, the Hittites gained influence in this region fighting the Mitanni Empire.

=== Iron Age ===
The Early Iron Age at Norşuntepe (1150–800 BC) is characterized by a shift away from Hittite material culture, possibly as a result of the influx of immigrants such as the Mushki. The settlement seems to have been restricted to the south terrace and may have had a rural character.

==== Urartu period ====
During its final occupation phases (800–600 BC), Norşuntepe was part of Urartu. A building with a large, columned hall was located on the mail hill, whereas a second large building, possibly a caravanserai, was excavated on the south terrace. A cemetery located on the hill top included a burial chamber where three horses together with gear and weapons were buried.

The hilltop was again used as a cemetery during the medieval period.

== Excavations ==
It was excavated between 1968 and 1974 under the direction of German archaeologist Harald Hauptmann as part of the salvage project to document archaeological sites that would be flooded by the construction of the Keban Dam. Excavation of the site focused on three areas: the western slope, the so-called "acropolis" area, and the south terrace.

== See also ==
- Aratashen
