= Sar Gol, Hormozgan =

Sar Gol سرگل
- Village
- Location within Iran
- Coordinates: 27°33′29″N 57°09′24″E
- Country: Iran
- Province: Hormozgan
- County: Rudan
- Bakhsh: Central
- Rural District: Rahdar

Population (2006)
  - Total: 22
- Time zone: UTC+3:30 (IRST)
  - Summer (DST): UTC+4:30 (IRDT)

Sar Gol (Persian: سرگل) is a village in Rahdar Rural District, in the Central District of Rudan County, Hormozgan Province, Iran. At the 2006 census, its population was 22, in 7 families.
