= Tianshanbeilu culture =

Ancient Chinese bronze age culture

- Tianshanbeilu culture and contemporary cultures c. -3000
- Geographical range: Eastern Tarim Basin
- Period: Bronze Age
- Dates: c. 2000 – c. 1802 BCE

Chinese name
- Simplified Chinese: 天山北路文化
Transcriptions

The Tianshanbeilu culture (天山北路文化, 2022–1802 cal BCE), also named Linya, Yalinban or Yamansukuang, is an ancient Bronze Age culture centered around the Tianshanbeilu cemetery in the region of Hami. The Tianshanbeilu culture played an important role in connecting the Hexi Corridor with the Tianshan Corridor. The cemetery remained in use until 1093–707 cal BCE. Tianshanbeilu is the largest Bronze Age site in eastern Xinjiang.

The people of Tianshanbeilu essentially relied on sedentary agriculture. They had a very rich material culture, with quantities of pottery, bronze artifacts and jewelry.

Genetically, the population was mixed, with about 79% of the population derived from Eastern Eurasian lineage, while 21% of the population had a western lineage. It has been suggested that the initial population came from the Hexi Corridor, and thereafter mixed with populations from the West.

The Tianshanbelu culture is considered as a cultural intermediary between the Hexi Corridor and the northwestern Eurasian steppes, as it shares commons cultural characteristics with both areas. Since the Bronze Age, technological and cultural interactions between the people of the Hexi Corridor took place there, between the people of the Hexi Corridor, western Tianshan Mountains and Altai Mountains. It is thought that the Qijia culture of China may have borrowed its bronze metallurgy from Tianshanbeilu and other cultures of the Altai area. The area of eastern Xinjiang appears as a zone of cultural and technological exchange between Eurasia and Western Asia and central China, most probably from the late 4th millennium to the mid-3rd millennium (3000-2500 BCE). Transmissions occurred with cereal crops, domesticated animals, and also painted ceramics from China.

Faience beads were excavated at Tianshanbeilu and dated to 1700-1400 BCE. It is thought that their technology was transferred to China, where faience beads appear in Western Zhou tombs, circa 1040-910 BCE, in the Shanxi-Shaanxi region. Faience beads of Chinese manufacture were then exported back from China to the Xinjiang region during the 1st millennium BCE, as shown by finds in the nearby Wupu cemetery.

== Sources ==
- Liu, Li; Chen, Xingcan (30 April 2012). The Archaeology of China: From the Late Paleolithic to the Early Bronze Age. Cambridge University Press. doi:10.1017/CBO9781139015301.010.
- Tong, Jianyi; Ma, Jian; Li, Wenying; Chang, Xi’en; Yu, Jianjun; Wang, Jianxin; Ma, Yingxia; Tian, Yiliang; Reheman, Kuerban; Simayi, Mulati; Ruiliang, Liu (February 2021). "Chronology of the Tianshanbeilu Cemetery in Xinjiang, Northwestern China". Radiocarbon. 63 (1): 343–356. doi:10.1017/RDC.2020.96. S2CID 225129244.
- Liu, Cheng; Liu, Ruiliang; Zhou, Pengcheng; Lu, Chun; Yang, Zengxin; Pollard, A. Mark; Hommel, Peter; Ma, Jian; Cui, Jianfeng; Bray, Peter; Tong, Jianyi; Rawson, Jessica (June 2020). "Metallurgy at the Crossroads: New Analyses of Copper‐based Objects at Tianshanbeilu, Eastern Xinjiang, China". Acta Geologica Sinica - English Edition. 94 (3): 594–602. doi:10.1111/1755-6724.14531. S2CID 219914115.
- Wan, Xiang (2011). "Early development of bronze metallurgy in Eastern Eurasia". Sino-Platonic Papers. 213: 4–5.
