= Palang Darreh, Mazandaran =

Palang Darreh پلنگ دره
- Village
- Location within Iran
- Coordinates: 36°13′02″N 53°00′29″E
- Country: Iran
- Province: Mazandaran
- County: Babol
- Bakhsh: Bandpey-ye Gharbi
- Rural District: Khvosh Rud

Population (2006)
  - Total: 228
- Time zone: UTC+3:30 (IRST)

Palang Darreh (Persian: پلنگ دره) is a village in Khvosh Rud Rural District, Bandpey-ye Gharbi District, Babol County, Mazandaran Province, Iran. At the 2006 census, its population was 228, in 63 families.
