= Shuran, Chaharmahal and Bakhtiari =

Shuran شوران
- Village
- Location within Iran
- Coordinates: 31°56′26″N 50°27′59″E
- Country: Iran
- Province: Chaharmahal and Bakhtiari
- County: Ardal
- Bakhsh: Central
- Rural District: Dinaran

Population (2006)
  - Total: 315
- Time zone: UTC+3:30 (IRST)
  - Summer (DST): UTC+4:30 (IRDT)

Shuran (Persian: شوران, also Romanized as Shūrān) is a village in Dinaran Rural District, in the Central District of Ardal County, Chaharmahal and Bakhtiari Province, Iran. At the 2006 census, its population was 315, in 64 families. The village is populated by Lurs.
