= Arsenical copper =

Alloy of copper with arsenic

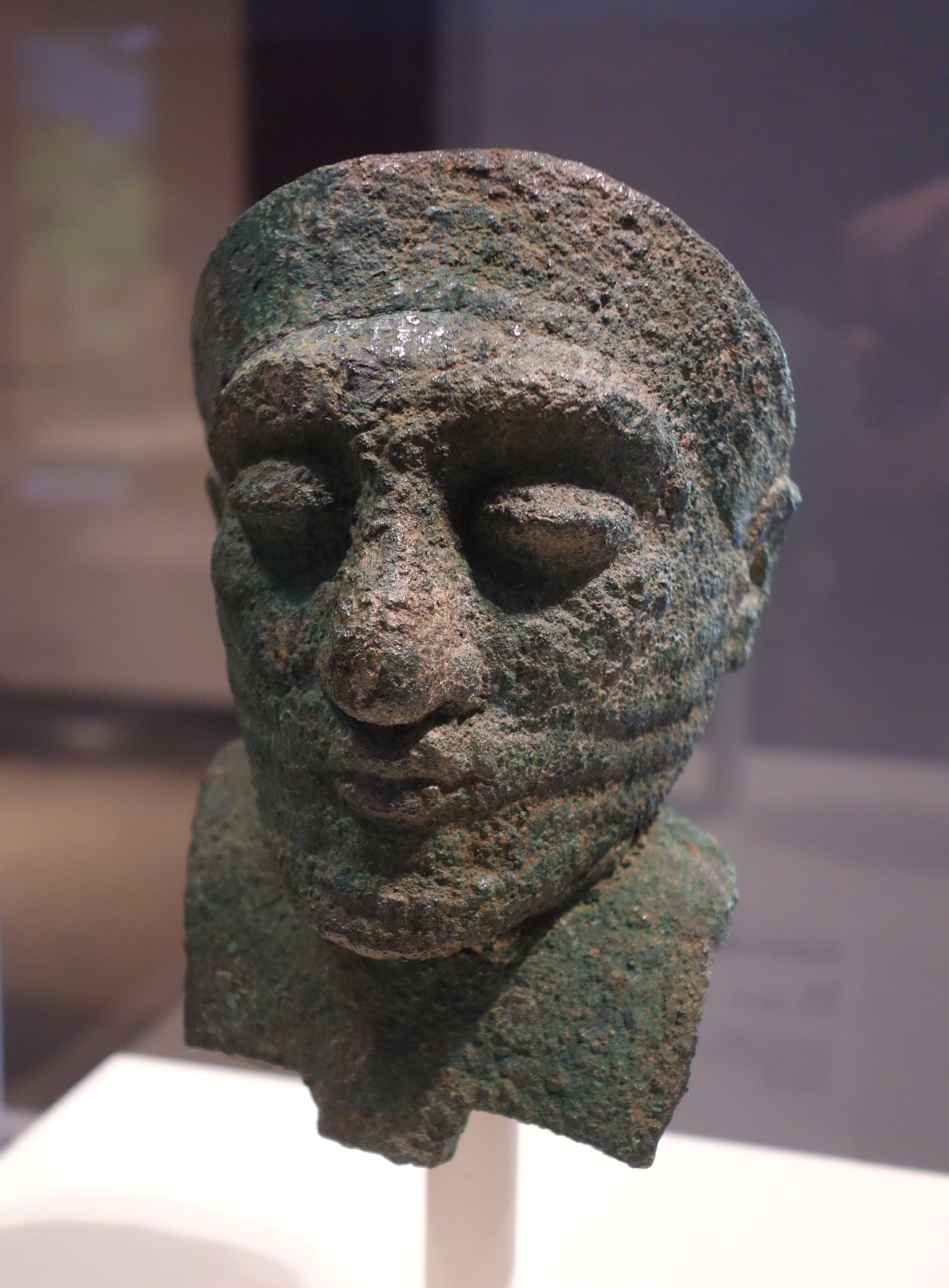
Sculpted head of a dignitary from ancient Iran (c.2000 BC) in arsenical copper

Arsenical copper contains up to 0.5% arsenic which, at elevated temperatures, imparts higher tensile strength and a reduced tendency to scaling. It is typically specified in boiler work, especially locomotive fireboxes. It also helps prevent embrittlement of oxygen-free copper by bismuth, antimony and lead by the formation of complex oxides. Copper with a larger percentage of arsenic is called arsenical bronze, which can be work-hardened much harder than copper.

Especially in Egyptian archaeology and ancient Near Eastern archaeology, arsenical copper is used as a term for the material widely used before the beginning of the New Kingdom, i.e. in the Chalcolithic, Early and Middle Bronze Age, for practical objects, tools, weapons, but also vessels. This is because the intentionality of the production of alloy was doubted in the earlier literature, even if arsenic was detected in crucibles producing such material. An industrial-scale production was demonstrated for the Early Bronze Age Iran, at the site of Arisman. Recent data indicate that also in ancient Egypt, specifically in Middle Kingdom, arsenical bronze was produced intentionally, and the use of the term arsenical bronze is warranted. Despite these findings, majority of researchers will be still using the term arsenical copper.

== See also ==
- Arsenical bronze
- Arsenical brass
