= Pishva =

City in Tehran province, Iran

Pishva Persian: پيشوا
- City
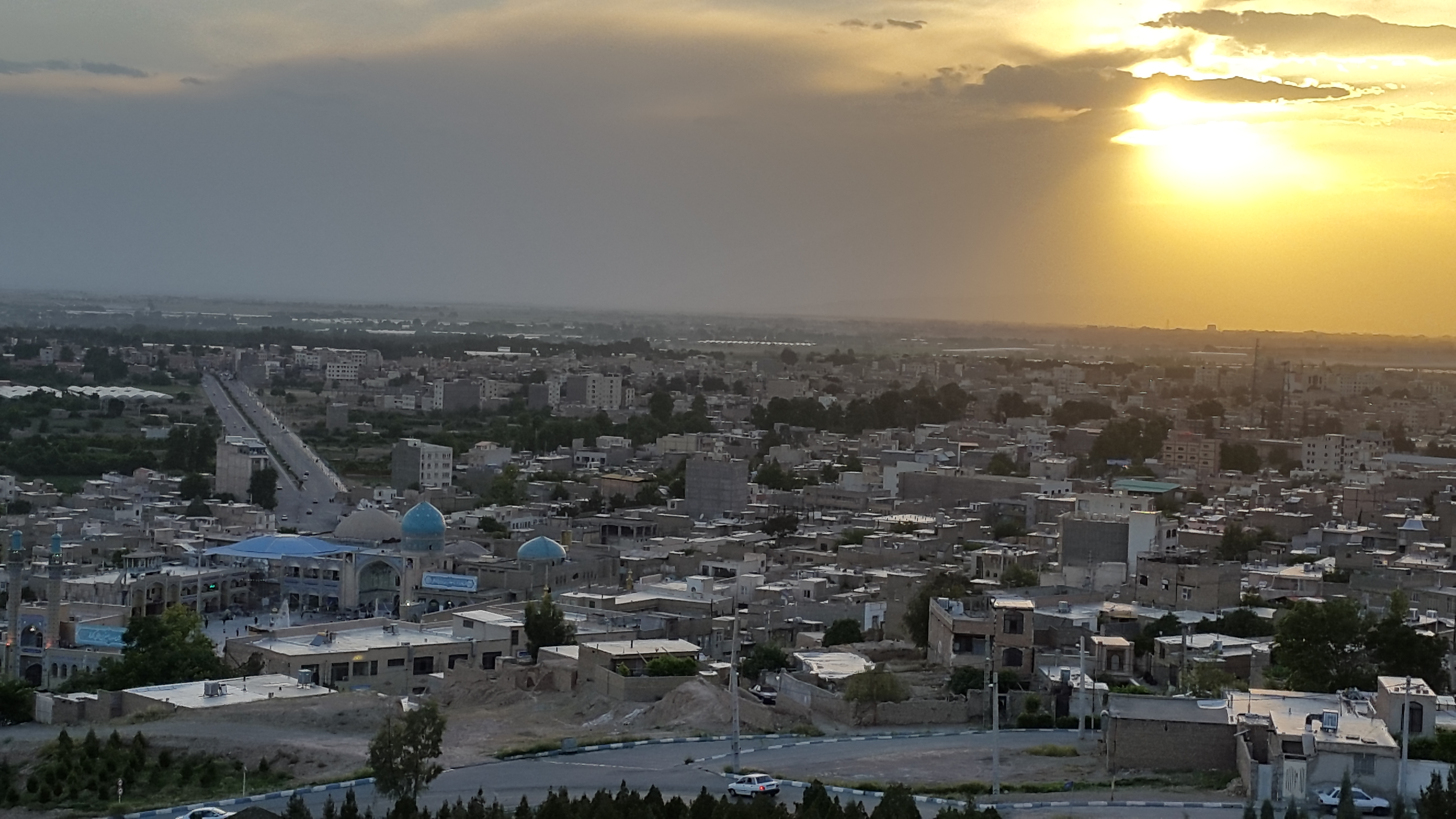
- The city of Pishva

- Location within Iran
- Coordinates: 35°18′24″N 51°43′14″E
- Country: Iran
- Province: Tehran
- County: Pishva
- District: Central
- Elevation: 937 m (3,074 ft)

Population (2016)
  - Total: 59,184
- Time zone: UTC+3:30 (IRST)

Pishva (Persian: پيشوا) (Note: Also romanized as Pīshvā; also known as Emāmzādeh Ja‘far, Pīchvā, Pīshvah, Pīshyān, and Samenat) is a city in the Central District of Pishva County, Tehran province, Iran, serving as capital of both the county and the district.

== Demographics ==
Historical Population of Pishva
Year	Pop.	±%
1986	17,283	—
1996	29,884	+72.9%
2006	41,450	+38.7%
2011	47,253	+14.0%
2016	59,184	+25.2%

=== Language and ethnicity ===
The residents of Pishva are mainly Persian-speaking Shias and are predominantly descendants of the original residents of the Tehran and Ray area. Members of the Joneidi clan are the most prominent residents of the city. In Persian the word Pishva means Imam and leader and refers to the mausoleum of Imamzadeh Ja'far, who is considered the son of the seventh Shi'ite Imam, Imam Mousa Al-Kazim.

=== Population ===
At the time of the 2006 National Census, the city's population was 41,480 in 10,734 households, when it was capital of the former Pishva District of Varamin County. The following census in 2011 counted 47,253 people in 13,352 households, by which time the district had been separated from the county in the establishment of Pishva County. Pishva was transferred to the new Central District as the county's capital. The 2016 census measured the population of the city as 59,184 people in 18,054 households.

== See also ==
Media related to Pishva at Wikimedia Commons
