= Tarand-e Bala Rural District =

Rural district in Tehran province, Iran

Tarand-e Bala Rural District Persian: دهستان طارند بالا
- Rural District
- Location within Iran
- Coordinates: 35°22′N 51°45′E
- Country: Iran
- Province: Tehran
- County: Pishva
- District: Jalilabad
- Capital: Tarand-e Bala

Population (2016)
  - Total: 6,030
- Time zone: UTC+3:30 (IRST)

Tarand-e Bala Rural District (Persian: دهستان طارند بالا) is in Jalilabad District of Pishva County, Tehran province, Iran. Its capital is the village of Tarand-e Bala.

== History ==
In 2010, Pishva District was separated from Varamin County in the establishment of Pishva County, and Tarand-e Bala Rural District was created in the new Jalilabad District.

== Demographics ==
=== Population ===
At the time of the 2011 National Census, the rural district's population was 6,609 inhabitants in 1,663 households. The 2016 census measured the population of the rural district as 6,030 in 1,644 households. The most populous of its 17 villages was Tarand-e Bala, with 1,283 people.

=== Other villages in the rural district ===
- Aliabad-e Khaleseh
- Quinak-e Rakhshani
- Shoeybabad-e Now
- Shuran
- Shushabad
- Tarand-e Pain
- Yam
