= Asgariyeh Rural District =

Rural district in Tehran province, Iran

Asgariyeh Rural District Persian: دهستان عسگريه
- Rural District
- Location within Iran
- Coordinates: 35°21′N 51°41′E
- Country: Iran
- Province: Tehran
- County: Pishva
- District: Central
- Established: 1995
- Capital: Asgarabad-e Abbasi

Population (2016)
  - Total: 10,187
- Time zone: UTC+3:30 (IRST)

Asgariyeh Rural District (Persian: دهستان عسگريه) is in the Central District of Pishva County, Tehran province, Iran. Its capital is the village of Asgarabad-e Abbasi.

== Demographics ==
=== Population ===
At the time of the 2006 National Census, the rural district's population (as a part of the former Pishva District in Varamin County) was 14,364 in 3,308 households. There were 10,400 inhabitants in 2,677 households at the following census of 2011, by which time the district had been separated from the county in the establishment of Pishva County. The rural district was transferred to the new Central District. The 2016 census measured the population of the rural district as 10,187 in 2,807 households. The most populous of its 14 villages was Habibabad, with 2,310 people.

=== Other villages in the rural district ===
- Deh-e Masin
- Gol Abbas
- Qasemabad
- Qeshlaq-e Yusef Reza
- Saidabad
- Sar Gol
