= Jalilabad Rural District =

Rural district in Tehran province, Iran

Jalilabad Rural District Persian: دهستان جليل اباد
- Rural District
- Location within Iran
- Coordinates: 35°19′N 51°50′E
- Country: Iran
- Province: Tehran
- County: Pishva
- District: Jalilabad
- Capital: Jalilabad

Population (2016)
  - Total: 6,960
- Time zone: UTC+3:30 (IRST)

Jalilabad Rural District (Persian: دهستان جليل اباد) (Note: Formerly Behnamsokhteh-e Jonubi Rural District (دهستان بهنام سوخته جنوبي)) is in Jalilabad District of Pishva County, Tehran province, Iran. It is administered from the city of Jalilabad.

== Demographics ==
=== Population ===
At the time of the 2006 National Census, the rural district's population (as Behnamsokhteh-e Jonubi Rural District of the former Pishva District in Varamin County) was 14,151 in 3,246 households. There were 7,300 inhabitants in 1,958 households at the following census of 2011, by which time the district had been separated from the county in the establishment of Pishva County. The rural district was transferred to the new Jalilabad District and renamed Jalilabad Rural District. The 2016 census measured the population of the rural district as 6,960 in 1,992 households. The most populous of its nine villages was Jalilabad (now a city), with 5,216 people.

=== Other villages in the rural district ===
- Akbarabad-e Kazemi
- Mahmudabad-e Kohneh
- Mahmudabad-e Now
- Qaleh Now
- Qeshlaq-e Jalilabad
- Shotor Khvar
- Yusefabad
