= Central District (Pishva County) =

District in Tehran province, Iran

Central District (Pishva County) Persian: بخش مرکزی شهرستان پیشوا
- District
- Location within Iran
- Coordinates: 35°20′N 51°43′E
- Country: Iran
- Province: Tehran
- County: Pishva
- Established: 2010
- Capital: Pishva

Population (2016)
  - Total: 73,611
- Time zone: UTC+3:30 (IRST)

The Central District of Pishva County (Persian: بخش مرکزی شهرستان پیشوا) is in Tehran province, Iran. Its capital is the city of Pishva.

== History ==
In 2010, Pishva District was separated from Varamin County in the establishment of Pishva County, which was divided into two districts of two rural districts each, with Pishva as its capital and only city at the time.

== Demographics ==
=== Population ===
At the time of the 2011 census, the district's population was 61,545 people in 17,021 households. The 2016 census measured the population of the district as 73,611 inhabitants in 22,068 households.

=== Administrative divisions ===
Central District (Pishva County) Population
Administrative Divisions	2011	2016
Asgariyeh RD	10,400	10,187
Pishva RD	3,892	4,240
Pishva (city)	47,253	59,184
Total	61,545	73,611
RD = Rural District
