= Jalilabad District (Iran) =

District in Tehran province, Iran

Jalilabad District Persian: بخش جلیل آباد
- District
- Location within Iran
- Coordinates: 35°20′N 51°47′E
- Country: Iran
- Province: Tehran
- County: Pishva
- Established: 2010
- Capital: Jalilabad

Population (2016)
  - Total: 12,990
- Time zone: UTC+3:30 (IRST)

Jalilabad District (Persian: بخش جلیل آباد) is in Pishva County, Tehran province, Iran. Its capital is the city of Jalilabad.

== History ==
In 2010, Pishva District was separated from Varamin County in the establishment of Pishva County, which was divided into two districts of two rural districts each, with Pishva as its capital and only city at the time.

== Demographics ==
=== Population ===
At the time of the 2011 National Census, the district's population was 13,909 people in 3,621 households in Jalilabad District. The 2016 census measured the population of the district as 12,990 inhabitants in 3,636 households.

=== Administrative divisions ===
Jalilabad District Population
Administrative Divisions	2011	2016
Jalilabad RD (Note: Formerly Behnamsokhteh-e Jonubi Rural District)	7,300	6,960
Tarand-e Bala RD	6,609	6,030
Jalilabad (city) (Note: Became a city after the 2016 census)		
Total	13,909	12,990
RD = Rural District
