= Pishva District =

Former district in Tehran province, Iran

Pishva District Persian: بخش پیشوا
- Former District
- Location within Iran
- Coordinates: 35°20′N 51°46′E
- Country: Iran
- Province: Tehran
- County: Varamin
- Established: 1995
- Capital: Pishva

Population (2006)
  - Total: 69,995
- Time zone: UTC+3:30 (IRST)

Pishva District (Persian: بخش پیشوا) is a former administrative division of Varamin County, Tehran province, Iran. Its capital was the city of Pishva.

== History ==
In 2010, the district was separated from the county in the establishment of Pishva County.

== Demographics ==
=== Population ===
At the time of the 2006 National Census, the district's population was 69,995 in 17,288 households.

=== Administrative divisions ===
Pishva District Population
Administrative Divisions	2006
Asgariyeh RD	14,364
Behnamsokhteh-e Jonubi RD (Note: Renamed Jalilabad Rural District)	14,151
Pishva (city)	41,480
Total	69,995
RD = Rural District
