= Pishva County =

County in Tehran province, Iran

Pishva County Persian: شهرستان پیشوا
- County
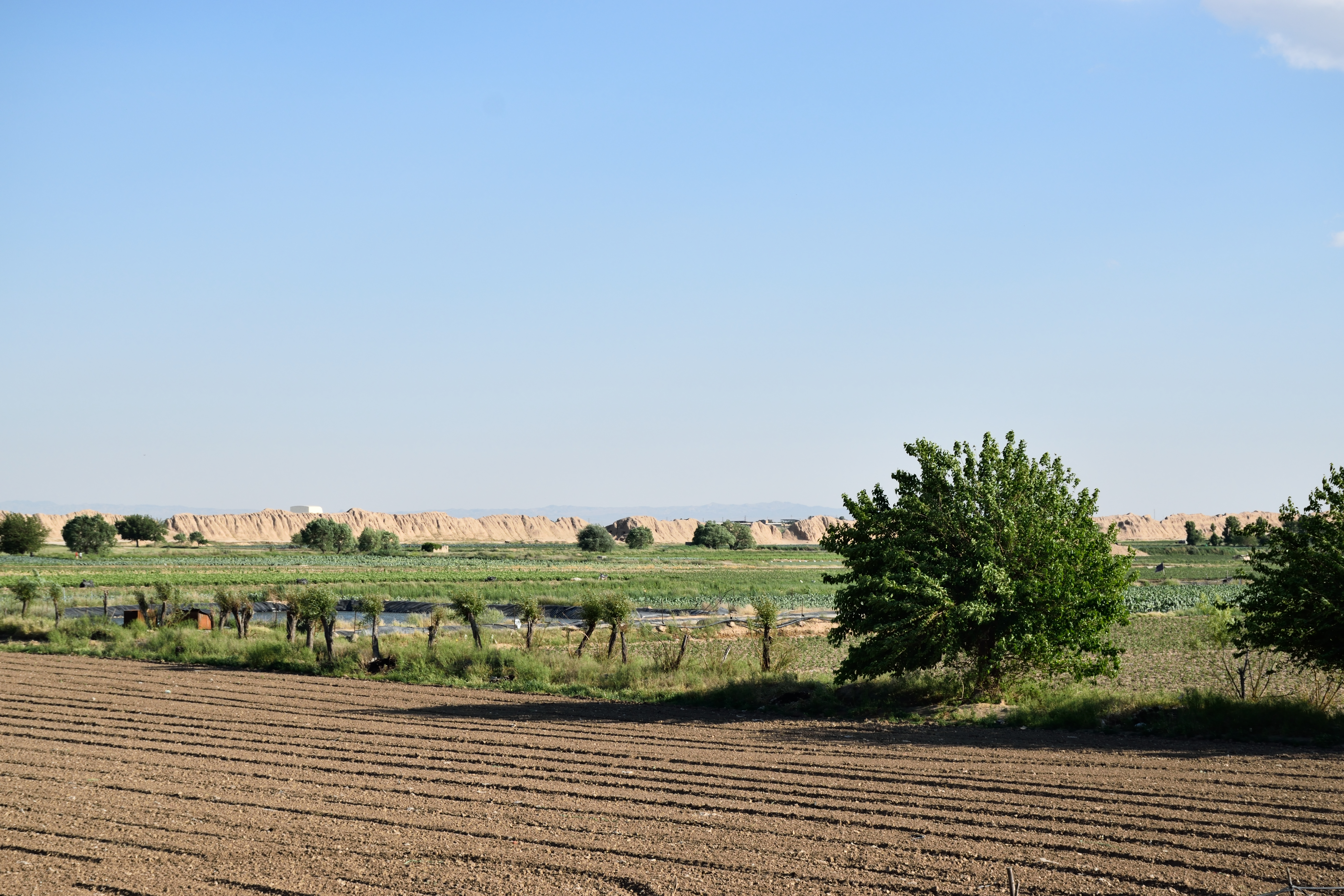
- Landscape near Iraj Castle in Pishva County

- Location of Pishva County in Tehran province (center right, yellow)

- Location of Tehran province in Iran
- Coordinates: 35°20′N 51°46′E
- Country: Iran
- Province: Tehran
- Established: 2010
- Capital: Pishva
- Districts: Central, Jalilabad

Population (2016)
  - Total: 86,601
- Time zone: UTC+3:30 (IRST)

Pishva County (Persian: شهرستان پیشوا) is in Tehran province, Iran. Its capital is the city of Pishva.

== History ==
In 2010, Pishva District was separated from Varamin County in the establishment of Pishva County, which was divided into two districts of two rural districts each, with Pishva as its capital and only city at the time. The village of Jalilabad was converted to a city in 2019.

== Demographics ==
=== Population ===
At the time of the 2011 census, the county's population was 75,454 people in 20,629 households. The 2016 census measured the population of the county as 86,601, in 25,704 households.

=== Administrative divisions ===
Pishva County's population history and administrative structure over two consecutive censuses are shown in the following table.

Pishva County Population
Administrative Divisions	2011	2016
Central District	61,545	73,611
Asgariyeh RD	10,400	10,187
Pishva RD	3,892	4,240
Pishva (city)	47,253	59,184
Jalilabad District	13,909	12,990
Jalilabad RD (Note: Formerly Behnamsokhteh-e Jonubi Rural District)	7,300	6,960
Tarand-e Bala RD	6,609	6,030
Jalilabad (city) (Note: Became a city after the 2016 census)		
Total	75,454	86,601
RD = Rural District

== Climate ==
According to the information of the State Meteorological Organization of Tehran province, the long-term average annual rainfall in Pishva is around 131.8 mm

== See also ==
Media related to Pishva County at Wikimedia Commons
