= Aliabad-e Sofla =

Aliabad-e Sofla (Persian: علي ابادسفلي) may refer to the following places in Iran:

- Aliabad-e Sofla, East Azerbaijan
- Aliabad-e Sofla, Marvdasht, Fars Province
- Aliabad-e Sofla, Ilam
- Aliabad-e Sofla, Rudbar-e Jonubi, Kerman Province
- Aliabad-e Sofla, Zarand, Kerman Province
- Aliabad-e Sofla, Kermanshah
- Aliabad-e Sofla, Kangavar, Kermanshah Province
- Aliabad-e Sofla, Khuzestan
- Aliabad-e Sofla, Lorestan
- Aliabad-e Sofla, Razavi Khorasan
- Aliabad-e Sofla, South Khorasan

== See also ==
- Aliabad-e Pain (disambiguation)
