= Aliabad-e Pain =

Aliabad-e Pain or Aliabad Pain (Persian: علی‌آباد پایین) may refer to the following places in Iran:

- Aliabad-e Pain, East Azerbaijan
- Aliabad-e Pain, Marvdasht, Fars Province
- Aliabad-e Pain, Sepidan, Fars Province
- Aliabad-e Pain, Shiraz, Fars Province
- Aliabad-e Pain, Isfahan
- Aliabad-e Pain, Kerman
- Aliabad-e Pain, Anbarabad, Kerman Province
- Aliabad-e Pain, Zarand, Kerman Province
- Aliabad-e Pain, Kermanshah
- Aliabad-e Pain, Mazandaran
- Aliabad-e Pain, Razavi Khorasan
- Aliabad-e Pain, South Khorasan
- Aliabad-e Pain, Jolgeh-e Mazhan, South Khorasan Province

== See also ==
- Aliabad-e Sofla (disambiguation)
