= Aliabad-e Olya =

Aliabad-e Olya (Persian: علي ابادعليا) may refer to:

- Aliabad-e Olya, East Azerbaijan
- Aliabad-e Olya, Fars
- Aliabad-e Olya, Ilam
- Aliabad-e Olya, Kerman
- Aliabad-e Olya, Zarand, Kerman Province
- Aliabad-e Olya, Kermanshah
- Aliabad-e Olya, Kangavar, Kermanshah Province
- Aliabad-e Olya, Khuzestan
- Aliabad-e Olya, Lorestan
- Aliabad-e Olya, Razavi Khorasan
- Aliabad-e Olya, South Khorasan

== See also ==
- Aliabad-e Bala (disambiguation)
