= Jarrah (disambiguation) =

Jarrah may refer to:

- Eucalyptus marginata, commonly known as jarrah, a species of tree in Western Australia
- Jarrah (name), a name (including a list of people with the name)
- Jarrah (surgeon), Arabic word for surgeon
- Idiosoma jarrah, species of Australian spider
- Sheikh Jarrah controversy, part of the Israeli–Palestinian conflict

== Locations ==
=== Australia ===
- Jarrah Forest, an interim Australian bioregion in Western Australia

=== Middle East ===
- Khvajeh Jarrah, Iranian village in Chenaran Rural District
- Jubb al-Jarrah, village in central Syria
- Nahr-e Jarrah, Iranian village in Buzi Rural District
- Sheykh Jarrah, Iranian village in Mehraban-e Sofla Rural District
- Sheikh Jarrah, Palestinian neighborhood in Jerusalem
- Wadi Jarrah, river in northeastern Syria

== See also ==
- Jarrah dieback, the soil-borne disease caused by Phytophthora cinnamomi
- Jarahi
