= Aliabad-e Bala =

Aliabad-e Bala (Persian: علي ابادبالا) may refer to various places in Iran:

- Aliabad-e Bala, East Azerbaijan
- Aliabad-e Bala, Fars
- Aliabad-e Bala, Gilan
- Aliabad-e Bala, Kerman
- Aliabad-e Bala, Rafsanjan, Kerman Province
- Aliabad-e Bala, Zarand, Kerman Province
- Aliabad-e Bala, Kermanshah
- Aliabad-e Bala, Razavi Khorasan
- Aliabad-e Bala, Mahvelat, Razavi Khorasan Province
- Aliabad-e Bala, South Khorasan

== See also ==
- Aliabad-e Olya (disambiguation)
