= Ali, Razavi Khorasan =

Ali الي
- Village
- Location within Iran
- Coordinates: 35°07′29″N 59°04′22″E
- Country: Iran
- Province: Razavi Khorasan
- County: Mahvelat
- Bakhsh: Shadmehr
- Rural District: Azghand

Population (2006)
  - Total: 582
- Time zone: UTC+3:30 (IRST)
  - Summer (DST): UTC+4:30 (IRDT)

Ali (Persian: الي, also Romanized as Ālī) is a village in Azghand Rural District, Shadmehr District, Mahvelat County, Razavi Khorasan Province, Iran. At the 2006 census, its population was 582, in 154 families.

== See also ==
- List of cities, towns and villages in Razavi Khorasan Province
