= Qaleh Juq, Razavi Khorasan =

Qaleh Juq قلعه جوق
- Village
- Location within Iran
- Coordinates: 35°17′55″N 58°56′59″E
- Country: Iran
- Province: Razavi Khorasan
- County: Mahvelat
- Bakhsh: Shadmehr
- Rural District: Azghand

Population (2006)
  - Total: 517
- Time zone: UTC+3:30 (IRST)
  - Summer (DST): UTC+4:30 (IRDT)

Qaleh Juq (Persian: قلعه جوق, also Romanized as Qal‘eh Jūq and Qal‘eh-ye Jūq) is a village in Azghand Rural District, Shadmehr District, Mahvelat County, Razavi Khorasan Province, Iran. At the 2006 census, its population was 517, in 165 families.
