= Aliabad-e Vasat =

Aliabad-e Vasat علي ابادوسط
- Village
- Location within Iran
- Coordinates: 35°13′33″N 58°53′02″E
- Country: Iran
- Province: Razavi Khorasan
- County: Mahvelat
- Bakhsh: Shadmehr
- Rural District: Azghand

Population (2006)
  - Total: 232
- Time zone: UTC+3:30 (IRST)
  - Summer (DST): UTC+4:30 (IRDT)

Aliabad-e Vasat (Persian: علي ابادوسط, also Romanized as ‘Alīābād-e Vasaţ; also known as ‘Alīābād-e Mīāneh) is a village in Azghand Rural District, Shadmehr District, Mahvelat County, Razavi Khorasan Province, Iran. At the 2006 census, its population was 232, in 50 families.

== See also ==
- List of cities, towns and villages in Razavi Khorasan Province
