= Zarnukh =

Zarnukh زرنوخ
- Village
- Location within Iran
- Coordinates: 35°07′51″N 59°01′58″E
- Country: Iran
- Province: Razavi Khorasan
- County: Mahvelat
- Bakhsh: Shadmehr
- Rural District: Azghand

Population (2006)
  - Total: 101
- Time zone: UTC+3:30 (IRST)
  - Summer (DST): UTC+4:30 (IRDT)

Zarnukh (Persian: زرنوخ, also Romanized as Zarnūkh; also known as Jīnūk and Jūnūq) is a village in Azghand Rural District, Shadmehr District, Mahvelat County, Razavi Khorasan Province, Iran. At the 2006 census, its population was 101, in 27 families.
