= Qaleh Now, Mahvelat =

Qaleh Now قلعه نو
- Village
- Location within Iran
- Coordinates: 35°13′57″N 58°50′04″E
- Country: Iran
- Province: Razavi Khorasan
- County: Mahvelat
- Bakhsh: Shadmehr
- Rural District: Azghand

Population (2006)
  - Total: 359
- Time zone: UTC+3:30 (IRST)
  - Summer (DST): UTC+4:30 (IRDT)

Qaleh Now (Persian: قلعه نو, also Romanized as Qal`eh Now) is a village in Azghand Rural District, Shadmehr District, Mahvelat County, Razavi Khorasan Province, Iran. At the 2006 census, its population was 359, in 79 families.
