= Hasanabad, Mahvelat =

Village in Razavi Khorasan province, Iran

Hasanabad Persian: حسن اباد
- Village
- Location within Iran
- Coordinates: 35°01′38″N 58°49′33″E
- Country: Iran
- Province: Razavi Khorasan
- County: Mahvelat
- District: Central
- Rural District: Howmeh

Population (2016)
  - Total: 1,966
- Time zone: UTC+3:30 (IRST)

Hasanabad (Persian: حسن اباد) (Note: Also romanized as Ḩasanābād) is a village in, and the capital of, Howmeh Rural District in the Central District of Mahvelat County, Razavi Khorasan province, Iran. The previous capital of the rural district was the village of Abdolabad, now a city.

== Population ==
At the time of the 2006 National Census, the village's population was 1,637 in 416 households. The following census in 2011 counted 1,832 people in 532 households. The 2016 census measured the population of the village as 1,966 people in 596 households.
