= Zahirabad-e Pain =

Zahirabad-e Pain ظهيرابادپائين
- Village
- Location within Iran
- Coordinates: 35°07′59″N 58°57′56″E
- Country: Iran
- Province: Razavi Khorasan
- County: Mahvelat
- Bakhsh: Shadmehr
- Rural District: Azghand

Population (2006)
  - Total: 220
- Time zone: UTC+3:30 (IRST)
  - Summer (DST): UTC+4:30 (IRDT)

Zahirabad-e Pain (Persian: ظهيرابادپائين, also Romanized as Z̧ahīrābād-e Pā’īn; also known as Ribāt-i-Bībi, Z̧ahīrābād, and Z̧ahīrābād Soflā) is a village in Azghand Rural District, Shadmehr District, Mahvelat County, Razavi Khorasan Province, Iran. At the 2006 census, its population was 220, in 57 families.
