= Chenar, Mahvelat =

Village in Razavi Khorasan province, Iran

Chenar Persian: چنار
- Village
- Location within Iran
- Coordinates: 35°16′41″N 58°54′28″E
- Country: Iran
- Province: Razavi Khorasan
- County: Mahvelat
- District: Shadmehr
- Rural District: Azghand

Population (2016)
  - Total: 747
- Time zone: UTC+3:30 (IRST)

Chenar (Persian: چنار) (Note: Also romanized as Chenār) is a village in Azghand Rural District of Shadmehr District in Mahvelat County, Razavi Khorasan province, Iran.

== Demographics ==
=== Population ===
At the time of the 2006 National Census, the village's population was 1,076 in 271 households. The following census in 2011 counted 927 people in 280 households. The 2016 census measured the population of the village as 747 people in 248 households.
