= Dughabad, Mahvelat =

Village in Razavi Khorasan province, Iran

Dughabad Persian: دوغ اباد
- Village
- Location within Iran
- Coordinates: 35°05′02″N 58°51′16″E
- Country: Iran
- Province: Razavi Khorasan
- County: Mahvelat
- District: Shadmehr
- Rural District: Mahvelat-e Shomali

Population (2016)
  - Total: 2,780
- Time zone: UTC+3:30 (IRST)

Dughabad (Persian: دوغ اباد) (Note: Also romanized as Dūghābād) is a village in, and the capital of, Mahvelat-e Shomali Rural District in Shadmehr District of Mahvelat County, Razavi Khorasan province, Iran.

== Demographics ==
=== Population ===
At the time of the 2006 National Census, the village's population was 2,954 in 876 households. The following census in 2011 counted 2,943 people in 936 households. The 2016 census measured the population of the village as 2,780 people in 915 households, the most populous in its rural district.
