= Soltanabad, Mahvelat =

Village in Razavi Khorasan province, Iran

Soltanabad Persian: سلطان اباد
- Village
- Location within Iran
- Coordinates: 35°13′27″N 58°52′12″E
- Country: Iran
- Province: Razavi Khorasan
- County: Mahvelat
- District: Shadmehr
- Rural District: Azghand

Population (2016)
  - Total: 880
- Time zone: UTC+3:30 (IRST)

Soltanabad (Persian: سلطان اباد) (Note: Also romanized as Solţānābād; also known as Sultānabād) is a village in Azghand Rural District of Shadmehr District in Mahvelat County, Razavi Khorasan province, Iran.

== Demographics ==
=== Population ===
At the time of the 2006 National Census, the village's population was 899 in 218 households. The following census in 2011 counted 899 people in 263 households. The 2016 census measured the population of the village as 880 people in 283 households.
