= Eskandarabad =

Eskandarabad (Persian: اسكندراباد) may refer to:

- Eskandarabad, Khuzestan
- Eskandarabad, North Khorasan
- Eskandarabad, Razavi Khorasan
- Eskandarabad, Semnan
- Eskandarabad, West Azerbaijan
