= Eskandarabad, Razavi Khorasan =

Eskandarabad اسكندراباد
- Village
- Location within Iran
- Coordinates: 35°06′34″N 58°58′48″E
- Country: Iran
- Province: Razavi Khorasan
- County: Mahvelat
- Bakhsh: Shadmehr
- Rural District: Azghand

Population (2006)
  - Total: 38
- Time zone: UTC+3:30 (IRST)
  - Summer (DST): UTC+4:30 (IRDT)

Eskandarabad (Persian: اسكندراباد, also Romanized as Eskandarābād) is a village in Azghand Rural District, Shadmehr District, Mahvelat County, Razavi Khorasan Province, Iran. At the 2006 census, its population was 38, in 9 families.
