= Nasruyi =

Village in Razavi Khorasan province, Iran

Nasruyi Persian: نصروئي
- Village
- Location within Iran
- Coordinates: 34°54′21″N 58°36′56″E
- Country: Iran
- Province: Razavi Khorasan
- County: Mahvelat
- District: Central
- Rural District: Mahvelat-e Jonubi

Population (2016)
  - Total: 0
- Time zone: UTC+3:30 (IRST)

Nasruyi (Persian: نصروئي) (Note: Also romanized as Naşrūyī; also known as Naşrūnī) is a village in Mahvelat-e Jonubi Rural District (Note: Formerly Mahvelat Rural District) of the Central District in Mahvelat County, Razavi Khorasan province, Iran.

== Demographics ==
=== Population ===
At the time of the 2006 National Census, the village's population was 18 in five households. The following census in 2011 counted a population below the reporting threshold. The 2016 census measured the population of the village as zero.
