= Golestan, Mahvelat =

Village in Razavi Khorasan province, Iran

Golestan Persian: گلستان
- Village
- Location within Iran
- Coordinates: 35°10′53″N 58°46′41″E
- Country: Iran
- Province: Razavi Khorasan
- County: Mahvelat
- District: Shadmehr
- Rural District: Azghand

Population (2016)
  - Total: 541
- Time zone: UTC+3:30 (IRST)

Golestan (Persian: گلستان) (Note: Also romanized as Golestān) is a village in Azghand Rural District of Shadmehr District in Mahvelat County, Razavi Khorasan province, Iran.

== Demographics ==
=== Population ===
At the time of the 2006 National Census, the village's population was 479 in 102 households. The following census in 2011 counted 468 people in 131 households. The 2016 census measured the population of the village as 541 people in 158 households.
