= Miandehi, Mahvelat =

Village in Razavi Khorasan province, Iran

Miandehi Persian: مياندهي
- Village
- Location within Iran
- Coordinates: 34°52′48″N 58°37′39″E
- Country: Iran
- Province: Razavi Khorasan
- County: Mahvelat
- District: Central
- Rural District: Mahvelat-e Jonubi

Population (2016)
  - Total: 970
- Time zone: UTC+3:30 (IRST)

Miandehi (Persian: مياندهي) (Note: Also romanized as Meyāndehī, Mīāndehī, and Mīyāndehī; also known as Mandehī and Miyāndeh) is a village in Mahvelat-e Jonubi Rural District (Note: Formerly Mahvelat Rural District) of the Central District in Mahvelat County, Razavi Khorasan province, Iran.

== Demographics ==
=== Population ===
At the time of the 2006 National Census, the village's population was 870 in 223 households. The following census in 2011 counted 931 people in 273 households. The 2016 census measured the population of the village as 970 people in 280 households.
