= Ahmadabad, Mahvelat =

Village in Razavi Khorasan province, Iran

Ahmadabad Persian: احمداباد
- Village
- Location within Iran
- Coordinates: 35°05′28″N 58°45′05″E
- Country: Iran
- Province: Razavi Khorasan
- County: Mahvelat
- District: Shadmehr
- Rural District: Mahvelat-e Shomali

Population (2016)
  - Total: 1,413
- Time zone: UTC+3:30 (IRST)

Ahmadabad (Persian: احمداباد) (Note: Also romanized as Aḩmadābād; also known as Deh-e ‘Īsā Khān) is a village in Mahvelat-e Shomali Rural District of Shadmehr District in Mahvelat County, Razavi Khorasan province, Iran.

== Demographics ==
=== Population ===
At the time of the 2006 National Census, the village's population was 1,165 in 256 households. The following census in 2011 counted 1,301 people in 351 households. The 2016 census measured the population of the village as 1,413 people in 387 households.
