= Chehel Sar =

Village in Razavi Khorasan province, Iran

Chehel Sar Persian: چهل سر
- Village
- Location within Iran
- Coordinates: 35°02′14″N 58°53′31″E
- Country: Iran
- Province: Razavi Khorasan
- County: Mahvelat
- District: Shadmehr
- Rural District: Mahvelat-e Shomali

Population (2016)
  - Total: 82
- Time zone: UTC+3:30 (IRST)

Chehel Sar (Persian: چهل سر) is a village in Mahvelat-e Shomali Rural District of Shadmehr District in Mahvelat County, Razavi Khorasan province, Iran.

== Demographics ==
=== Population ===
At the time of the 2006 National Census, the village's population was 172 in 47 households. The following census in 2011 counted 101 people in 40 households. The 2016 census measured the population of the village as 82 people in 28 households.
