= Kheyrabad, Mahvelat =

Village in Razavi Khorasan province, Iran

Kheyrabad Persian: خيراباد
- Village
- Location within Iran
- Coordinates: 34°56′47″N 58°57′38″E
- Country: Iran
- Province: Razavi Khorasan
- County: Mahvelat
- District: Central
- Rural District: Mahvelat-e Jonubi

Population (2016)
  - Total: 1,051
- Time zone: UTC+3:30 (IRST)

Kheyrabad (Persian: خيراباد) (Note: Also romanized as Kheyrābād) is a village in Mahvelat-e Jonubi Rural District (Note: Formerly Mahvelat Rural District) of the Central District in Mahvelat County, Razavi Khorasan province, Iran.

== Demographics ==
=== Population ===
At the time of the 2006 National Census, the village's population was 1,296 in 351 households. The following census in 2011 counted 1,007 people in 337 households. The 2016 census measured the population of the village as 1,051 people in 362 households.
