= Shamsabad, Mahvelat =

Village in Razavi Khorasan province, Iran

Shamsabad Persian: شمس اباد
- Village
- Location within Iran
- Coordinates: 35°00′42″N 58°33′08″E
- Country: Iran
- Province: Razavi Khorasan
- County: Mahvelat
- District: Central
- Rural District: Mahvelat-e Jonubi

Population (2016)
  - Total: 958
- Time zone: UTC+3:30 (IRST)

Shamsabad (Persian: شمس اباد) (Note: Also romanized as Shamsābād) is a village in Mahvelat-e Jonubi Rural District (Note: Formerly Mahvelat Rural District) of the Central District in Mahvelat County, Razavi Khorasan province, Iran.

== Demographics ==
=== Population ===
At the time of the 2006 National Census, the village's population was 950 in 256 households. The following census in 2011 counted 976 people in 284 households. The 2016 census measured the population of the village as 958 people in 294 households.
