= Azghand =

Village in Razavi Khorasan province, Iran

Azghand Persian: ازغند
- Village
- Location within Iran
- Coordinates: 35°16′03″N 58°48′19″E
- Country: Iran
- Province: Razavi Khorasan
- County: Mahvelat
- District: Shadmehr
- Rural District: Azghand

Population (2016)
  - Total: 1,280
- Time zone: UTC+3:30 (IRST)

Azghand (Persian: ازغند) (Note: Also known as Azghaneh, Azhand, and Azqand) is a village in Azghand Rural District of Shadmehr District in Mahvelat County, Razavi Khorasan province, Iran.

== Demographics ==
=== Population ===
At the time of the 2006 National Census, the village's population was 1,313 in 402 households. The following census in 2011 counted 1,108 people in 406 households. The 2016 census measured the population of the village as 1,280 people in 440 households, the most populous in its rural district.
