= Zarmehr, Iran =

Village in Razavi Khorasan province, Iran

Zarmehr Persian: زرمهر
- Village
- Location within Iran
- Coordinates: 35°13′50″N 58°58′56″E
- Country: Iran
- Province: Razavi Khorasan
- County: Mahvelat
- District: Shadmehr
- Rural District: Azghand

Population (2016)
  - Total: 794
- Time zone: UTC+3:30 (IRST)

Zarmehr (Persian: زرمهر) (Note: Also known as Zarmeh, Zarmihr, Zīr Mehr, and Zīrmeh) is a village in Azghand Rural District of Shadmehr District in Mahvelat County, Razavi Khorasan province, Iran.

== Demographics ==
=== Population ===
At the time of the 2006 National Census, the village's population was 727 in 235 households. The following census in 2011 counted 754 people in 253 households. The 2016 census measured the population of the village as 794 people in 277 households.
