= Jarrah (name) =

Jarrah (Arabic: جراح, romanized: Jarrāḥ) is an Arabic name. The name Jarrah means "surgeon" in Arabic. The root of the word is derived from the Arabic word "جرح" (jarh), meaning "injury." It is a common surname in the Levant, especially in Syria, Palestine, and Lebanon, and in Iran.

Jarrah is also an Aboriginal Australian name, derived from the Noongar language of southwestern Australia, where the tree known as jarrah (Eucalyptus marginata) is native.

Additionally, Jarrah is a Hebrew name that means "honeycomb" or denotes a descendant of King Saul.

== Given name ==
- al-Jarrah ibn Abdallah, Umayyad governor and general
- Jarah Al Ateeqi, Kuwaiti footballer
- Jarrah McCleary, Australian member of the band Panama

== Surname ==
- Abu Ubayda ibn al-Jarrah (583–639), military leader and companion of Muhammad
- Al-Hasan ibn Makhlad al-Jarrah, Abbasid official who served in senior roles under Caliph al-Mutawakkil and Caliph al-Mu'tamid
- Ali Jarrah, former Ghanaian professional footballer
- Ali al-Jarrah (859–946), Abbasid official
- Balkees Jarrah, senior counsel on international justice at Human Rights Watch
- Daghfal ibn al-Jarrah, Jarrahid ruler
- Hussam al-Din al-Jarrahi (d 1202), Palestinian emir and personal physician of Saladin
- Mufarrij ibn Daghfal ibn al-Jarrah, emir in the Jarrahid dynasty who expanded the tribe's rule to much of Palestine
- Nouri al-Jarrah, Syrian poet and journalist
- Rami Jarrah, Syrian political activist
- Salwa Jarrah, Palestinian BBC Arabic broadcaster and author
- Waki' ibn al-Jarrah (d 812), prominent Hanafi hadith scholar and ascetic
- Yousef Al-Jarrah, Saudi actor
- Ziad Jarrah (1975–2001), Lebanese terrorist

== Fictional characters ==
- Sayid Jarrah, character on the television series Lost
