= Nasrabad, Mahvelat =

Village in Razavi Khorasan province, Iran

Nasrabad Persian: نصراباد
- Village
- Location within Iran
- Coordinates: 35°03′21″N 58°53′13″E
- Country: Iran
- Province: Razavi Khorasan
- County: Mahvelat
- District: Shadmehr
- Rural District: Mahvelat-e Shomali

Population (2016)
  - Total: 75
- Time zone: UTC+3:30 (IRST)

Nasrabad (Persian: نصراباد) (Note: Also romanized as Naşrābād) is a village in Mahvelat-e Shomali Rural District of Shadmehr District in Mahvelat County, Razavi Khorasan province, Iran.

== Demographics ==
=== Population ===
At the time of the 2006 National Census, the village's population was 120 in 31 households. The following census in 2011 counted 85 people in 25 households. The 2016 census measured the population of the village as 75 people in 24 households.
