= Hemmatabad, Mahvelat =

Village in Razavi Khorasan province, Iran

Hemmatabad Persian: همت اباد
- Village
- Location within Iran
- Coordinates: 35°03′48″N 58°39′23″E
- Country: Iran
- Province: Razavi Khorasan
- County: Mahvelat
- District: Central
- Rural District: Howmeh

Population (2016)
  - Total: 1,760
- Time zone: UTC+3:30 (IRST)

Hemmatabad (Persian: همت اباد) (Note: Also romanized as Hemmatābād; also known as Himmatābād) is a village in Howmeh Rural District of the Central District in Mahvelat County, Razavi Khorasan province, Iran.

== Population ==
At the time of the 2006 National Census, the village's population was 1,484 in 316 households. The following census in 2011 counted 1,663 people in 446 households. The 2016 census measured the population of the village as 1,760 people in 492 households.
