= Zahirabad, Iran =

Zahirabad (Persian: ظهيراباد) in Iran, may refer to:

- Zahirabad-e Astaneh, Markazi Province
- Zahirabad-e Nahr Mian, Markazi Province
- Zahirabad, Razavi Khorasan
- Zahirabad, Tehran
