= Khvosh Darreh =

Village in Razavi Khorasan province, Iran

Khvosh Darreh Persian: خوشدره
- Village
- Location within Iran
- Coordinates: 35°14′32″N 58°57′27″E
- Country: Iran
- Province: Razavi Khorasan
- County: Mahvelat
- District: Shadmehr
- Rural District: Azghand

Population (2016)
  - Total: 565
- Time zone: UTC+3:30 (IRST)

Khvosh Darreh (Persian: خوشدره) is a village in Azghand Rural District of Shadmehr District in Mahvelat County, Razavi Khorasan province, Iran.

== Demographics ==
=== Population ===
At the time of the 2006 National Census, the village's population was 424 in 142 households. The following census in 2011 counted 407 people in 149 households. The 2016 census measured the population of the village as 565 people in 200 households.
