= Fathabad, Mahvelat =

Village in Razavi Khorasan province, Iran

Fathabad Persian: فتح اباد
- Village
- Location within Iran
- Coordinates: 34°54′51″N 58°40′15″E
- Country: Iran
- Province: Razavi Khorasan
- County: Mahvelat
- District: Central
- Rural District: Mahvelat-e Jonubi

Population (2016)
  - Total: 343
- Time zone: UTC+3:30 (IRST)

Fathabad (Persian: فتح اباد) (Note: Also romanized as Fatḩābād) is a village in Mahvelat-e Jonubi Rural District (Note: Formerly Mahvelat Rural District) of the Central District in Mahvelat County, Razavi Khorasan province, Iran.

== Demographics ==
=== Population ===
At the time of the 2006 National Census, the village's population was 394 in 104 households. The following census in 2011 counted 420 people in 115 households. The 2016 census measured the population of the village as 343 people in 102 households.
