= Mehneh =

Village in Razavi Khorasan province, Iran

Mehneh Persian: مهنه
- Village
- Location within Iran
- Coordinates: 34°59′16″N 58°50′48″E
- Country: Iran
- Province: Razavi Khorasan
- County: Mahvelat
- District: Central
- Rural District: Mahvelat-e Jonubi

Population (2016)
  - Total: 3,560
- Time zone: UTC+3:30 (IRST)

Mehneh (Persian: مهنه) (Note: Also romanized as Mahneh; also known as Maina and Mīnā) is a village in, and the capital of, Mahvelat-e Jonubi Rural District (Note: Formerly Mahvelat Rural District) in the Central District of Mahvelat County, Razavi Khorasan province, Iran.

== Demographics ==
=== Population ===
At the time of the 2006 National Census, the village's population was 2,842 in 744 households. The following census in 2011 counted 3,145 people in 880 households. The 2016 census measured the population of the village as 3,560 people in 1,098 households, the most populous in its rural district.
