= Jannatabad, Mahvelat =

Village in Razavi Khorasan province, Iran

Jannatabad Persian: جنت اباد
- Village
- Location within Iran
- Coordinates: 34°56′35″N 58°39′20″E
- Country: Iran
- Province: Razavi Khorasan
- County: Mahvelat
- District: Central
- Rural District: Mahvelat-e Jonubi

Population (2016)
  - Total: 1,194
- Time zone: UTC+3:30 (IRST)

Jannatabad (Persian: جنت‌آباد) (Note: Also romanized as Jannatābād) is a village in Mahvelat-e Jonubi Rural District (Note: Formerly Mahvelat Rural District) of the Central District in Mahvelat County, Razavi Khorasan province, Iran.

== Demographics ==
=== Population ===
At the time of the 2006 National Census, the village's population was 1,210 in 289 households. The following census in 2011 counted 1,245 people in 341 households. The 2016 census measured the population of the village as 1,194 people in 348 households.
