= Jarahi, Mahvelat =

Village in Razavi Khorasan province, Iran

Jarahi Persian: جراحي
- Village
- Country: Iran
- Province: Razavi Khorasan
- County: Mahvelat
- District: Central
- Rural District: Mahvelat-e Jonubi

Population (2016)
  - Total: Below reporting threshold
- Time zone: UTC+3:30 (IRST)

Jarahi (Persian: جراحي) (Note: Also romanized as Jarāḥī) is a village in Mahvelat-e Jonubi Rural District (Note: Formerly Mahvelat Rural District) of the Central District in Mahvelat County, Razavi Khorasan province, Iran.

== Demographics ==
=== Population ===
At the time of the 2006 National Census, the village's population was 17 in four households. The following censuses in 2011 and 2016 counted a population below the reporting threshold.
