= Aliabad-e Sofla, Razavi Khorasan =

Village in Razavi Khorasan, Iran

Aliabad-e Sofla علي ابادسفلي
- Village
- Location within Iran
- Coordinates: 35°13′15″N 58°53′23″E
- Country: Iran
- Province: Razavi Khorasan
- County: Mahvelat
- Bakhsh: Shadmehr
- Rural District: Azghand

Population (2006)
  - Total: 453
- Time zone: UTC+3:30 (IRST)
  - Summer (DST): UTC+4:30 (IRDT)

Aliabad-e Sofla (Persian: علي ابادسفلي, also Romanized as ‘Alīābād-e Soflá; also known as ‘Alīābād-e Pā’īn) is a village in Azghand Rural District, Shadmehr District, Mahvelat County, Razavi Khorasan Province, Iran. At the 2006 census, its population was 453, in 100 families.

== See also ==
- List of cities, towns and villages in Razavi Khorasan Province
