= Jarahi =

Jarahi or Jarrahi (Persian: جراحي) may refer to:

- Jarahi, Mahvelat, Razavi Khorasan Province
- Jarrahi, Sabzevar, Razavi Khorasan Province
- Jarahi Rural District, in Khuzestan Province
- Jarahi River, in Khuzestan Province
