= Howmeh Rural District (Mahvelat County) =

Rural district in Razavi Khorasan province, Iran

Howmeh Rural District Persian: دهستان حومه
- Rural District
- Location within Iran
- Coordinates: 35°03′N 58°45′E
- Country: Iran
- Province: Razavi Khorasan
- County: Mahvelat
- District: Central
- Established: 2005
- Capital: Hasanabad

Population (2016)
  - Total: 9,344
- Time zone: UTC+3:30 (IRST)

Howmeh Rural District (Persian: دهستان حومه) is in the Central District of Mahvelat County, Razavi Khorasan province, Iran. Its capital is the village of Hasanabad. The previous capital of the rural district was the village of Abdolabad, now a city.

== Demographics ==
=== Population ===
At the time of the 2006 National Census, the rural district's population was 8,696 in 2,171 households. There were 9,345 inhabitants in 2,719 households at the following census of 2011. The 2016 census measured the population of the rural district as 9,344 in 2,827 households. The most populous of its 11 villages was Abdolabad (now a city), with 5,618 people.

=== Other villages in the rural district ===
- Hemmatabad
