= Shadmehr =

City in Razavi Khorasan province, Iran

Shadmehr Persian: شادمهر
- City
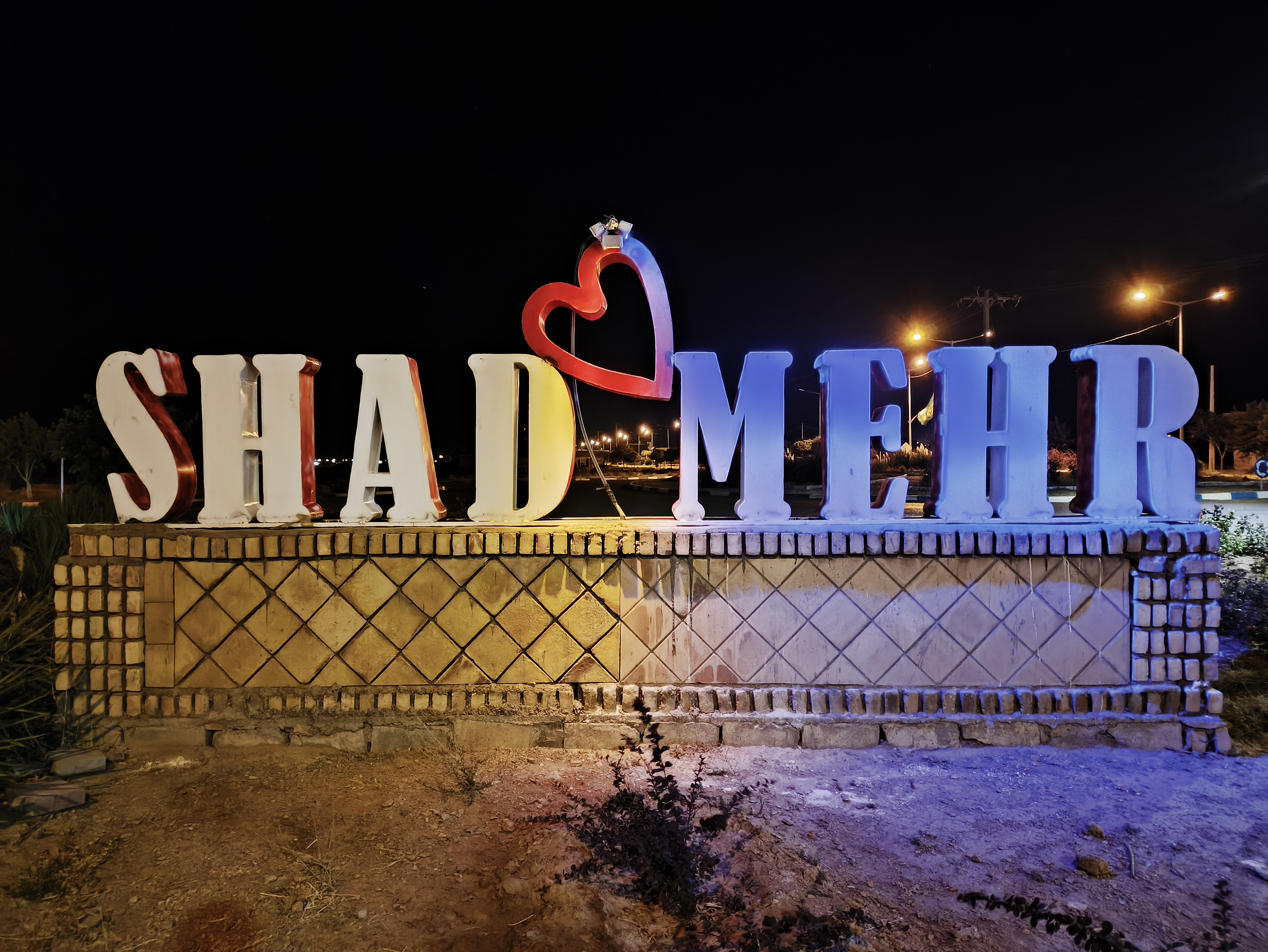
- Shadmehr city sign

- Location within Iran
- Coordinates: 35°10′20″N 59°02′14″E
- Country: Iran
- Province: Razavi Khorasan
- County: Mahvelat
- District: Shadmehr
- Established as a city: 2009

Population (2016)
  - Total: 3,825
- Time zone: UTC+3:30 (IRST)

Shadmehr (Persian: شادمهر) (Note: Also romanized as Shādmehr; also known as Shādmir and Shalimar) is a city in, and the capital of, Shadmehr District in Mahvelat County, Razavi Khorasan province, Iran. It also serves as the administrative center for Azghand Rural District.

== Demographics ==
=== Population ===
At the time of the 2006 National Census, Shadmehr's population was 3,369 in 848 households, when it was a village in Azghand Rural District. The following census in 2011 counted 3,678 people in 1,013 households, by which time the village of Shadmehr had been converted to a city. The 2016 census measured the population of the city as 3,825 people in 1,151 households.
