= Mahvelat-e Jonubi Rural District =

Rural district in Razavi Khorasan province, Iran

Mahvelat-e Jonubi Rural District Persian: دهستان مه ولات جنوبي
- Rural District
- Location within Iran
- Coordinates: 34°54′N 58°41′E
- Country: Iran
- Province: Razavi Khorasan
- County: Mahvelat
- District: Central
- Established: 1987
- Capital: Mehneh

Population (2016)
  - Total: 8,192
- Time zone: UTC+3:30 (IRST)

Mahvelat-e Jonubi Rural District (Persian: دهستان مه ولات جنوبي) (Note: Formerly Mahvelat Rural District (دهستان مه ولات)) is in the Central District of Mahvelat County, Razavi Khorasan province, Iran. Its capital is the village of Mehneh.

== Demographics ==
=== Population ===
At the time of the 2006 National Census, the rural district's population was 7,794 in 2,041 households. There were 7,890 inhabitants in 2,279 households at the following census of 2011. The 2016 census measured the population of the rural district as 8,192 in 2,518 households. The most populous of its 68 villages was Mehneh, with 3,560 people.

=== Other villages in the rural district ===
- Fathabad
- Jannatabad
- Jarahi
- Kheyrabad
- Miandehi
- Nasruyi
- Shamsabad
