= Mahvelat-e Shomali Rural District =

Rural district in Razavi Khorasan province, Iran

Mahvelat-e Shomali Rural District Persian: دهستان مه ولات شمالي
- Rural District
- Location within Iran
- Coordinates: 35°04′N 58°56′E
- Country: Iran
- Province: Razavi Khorasan
- County: Mahvelat
- District: Shadmehr
- Established: 2005
- Capital: Dughabad

Population (2016)
  - Total: 4,350
- Time zone: UTC+3:30 (IRST)

Mahvelat-e Shomali Rural District (Persian: دهستان مه ولات شمالي) is in Shadmehr District of Mahvelat County, Razavi Khorasan province, Iran. Its capital is the village of Dughabad.

== Demographics ==
=== Population ===
At the time of the 2006 National Census, the rural district's population was 4,424 in 1,214 households. There were 4,430 inhabitants in 1,352 households at the following census of 2011. The 2016 census measured the population of the rural district as 4,350 in 1,354 households. The most populous of its 14 villages was Dughabad, with 2,780 people.

=== Other villages in the rural district ===
- Ahmadabad
- Chehel Sar
- Nasrabad
