= Feyzabad, Razavi Khorasan =

City in Razavi Khorasan Province, Iran

Feyzabad Persian: فيض آباد
- City
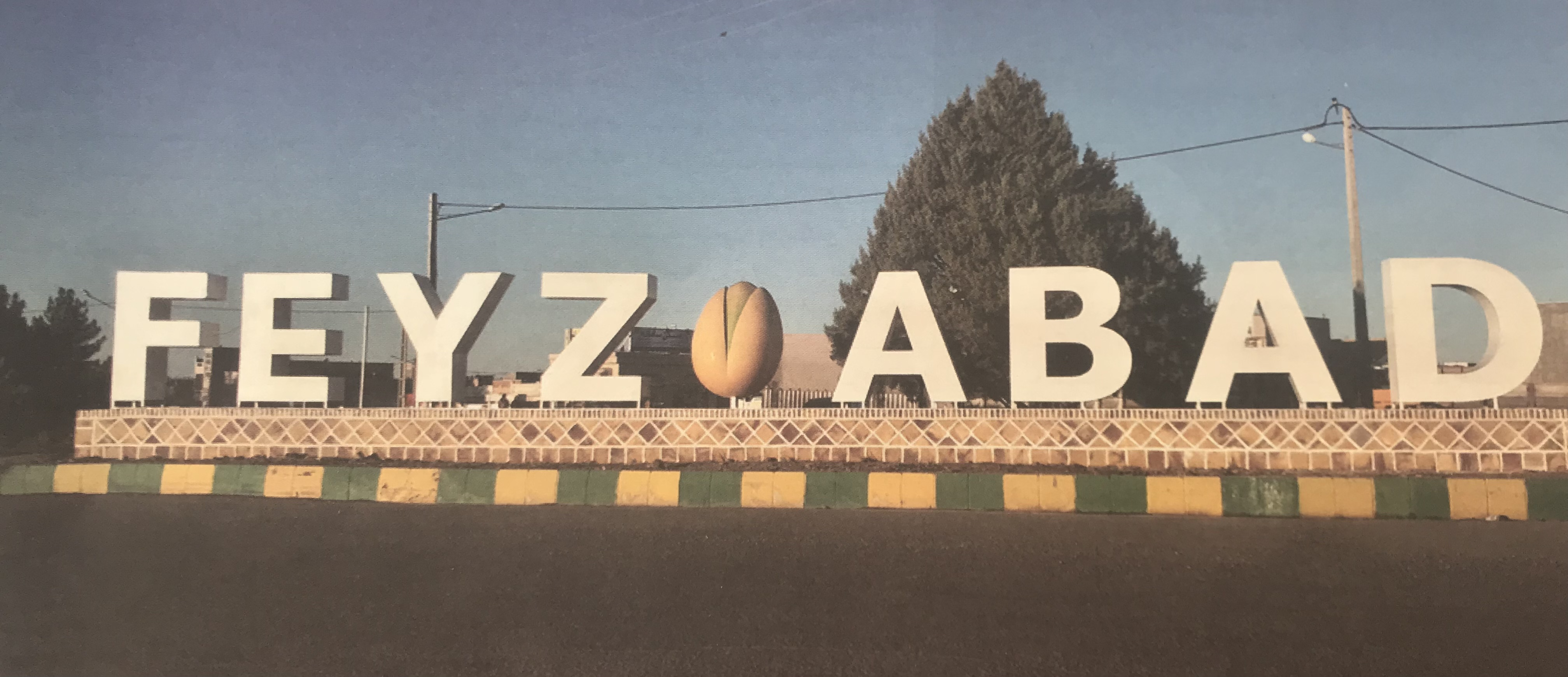
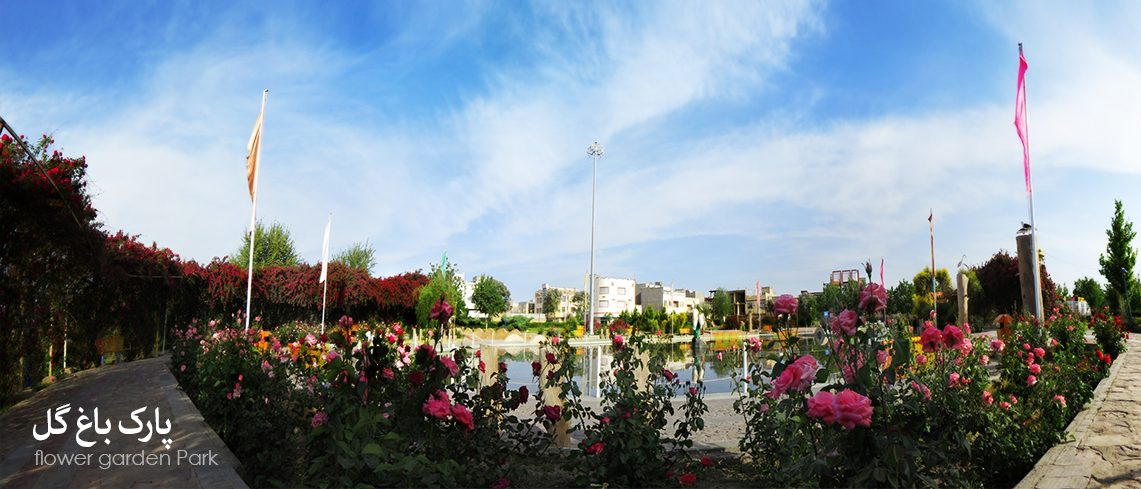
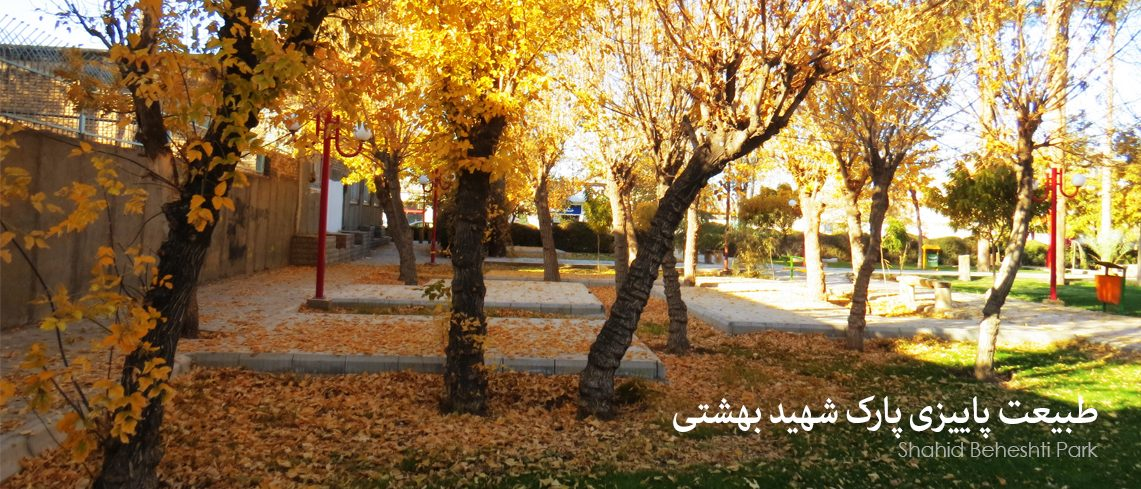
- From top: Rabat Feyzabad, Felestin Square, Flower Garden Park, Shahid Beheshti Park.

- Location within Iran
- Coordinates: 35°01′06″N 58°47′02″E
- Country: Iran
- Province: Razavi Khorasan
- County: Mahvelat
- District: Central

Government
  - Mayor: Reza Matlabipour

Area
  - Total: 3,256 km^{2} (1,257 sq mi)
- Elevation: 940 m (3,080 ft)

Population (2016)
  - Total: 18,120
  - Density: 5.565/km^{2} (14.41/sq mi)
- Time zone: UTC+3:30 (IRST)
- Area code: +9851-5672
- Website: www.feyzabad.ir

Feyzabad (Persian: فيض آباد) (Note: Also romanized as Faizābād, Feyẕābād, and Feyzābād) is a city in the Central District of Mahvelat County, Razavi Khorasan Province, Iran, serving as capital of both the county and the district.

== Demographics ==
=== Population ===
At the time of the 2006 National Census, the city's population was 14,721 in 3,827 households. The following census in 2011 counted 16,253 people in 4,563 households. The 2016 census measured the population of the city as 18,120 people in 5,496 households.

== Industry ==
In the field of industry, the city has an industrial area with all the necessary infrastructure for investment, which has a total area of 106 hectares and has an operational phase and two active industrial units.

The most important industrial and mining units of the city are six mines, which mainly have products of industrial soil, carcass stone and gypsum, which have an annual extraction rate of 25 to 30 thousand tons.

Regarding the processing of Mehwalat pistachio, which is processed in the same city, Mahvelat has 41 pistachio recording terminals with 55 processing lines, which employ 70 to 80 workers per day in each working season, which is 55 thousand tons per year. Pistachios are processed.

There are 15 active workshops and handicrafts in the city, of which there are currently 15 carpet weaving workshops, 5 carpet weaving units, 6 carpet weaving units, 2 kilim weaving units and 2 mosaic work units in the city, which have more than 220 licenses so far. Household jobs are also exported.

In the field of cooperatives, considering that cooperatives are one of the successful economic and social models in the world, he said: "Currently, there are more than 50 active cooperatives with 600 members in Mahvelat."

The economy of Mahvelat city is based on agriculture, so that the agricultural sector has 70%, services 20% and industry 7.5%

Mehvalat city is the largest orchard city in Khorasan Razavi province, so that it has the first place in the area under cultivation and production of two important and strategic products, pistachio and pomegranate in the region.

== Economic characteristics ==
The capabilities of Mahvelat city in the field of agriculture and animal husbandry are of special importance as with 42,558 hectares of land under cultivation of horticultural and agricultural products is one of the agricultural hubs of the province and the country. This city has 5,250 hectares of fertile pistachio orchards and production of 8,995 tons of dried pistachios and 42% of pistachios in the province and 1695 hectares of pomegranate orchards and production of 28035 tons of pomegranates and 32% of pomegranates in the province, the first place of production of these two products in the province. Cotton cultivated lands account for 9% of the province's cotton.

Cultivation in Mahvelat as 22,000 hectares and the average annual production as 100 to 110,000 tons. Of this amount, 22,000 tons of dried pistachios are processed and sent to consumer markets.

=== Commodity Exchange ===
Pistachio Commodity Exchange

In this exchange, hazelnut pistachio, which is a first-class product and the so-called "thirty, thirty-two" pistachios will be offered with a capacity of one hundred tons.

Diba Pistachio Company has a standard warehouse with a capacity of about 7,000 tons. In the first stage, a warehouse with a capacity of 100 tons for accepting standard products from farmers in Khorasan region in the commodity exchange has been accepted and the symbol of this warehouse has been inserted.

Regarding the entry of pistachios in the stock market, there is an advantage that the United States is the reference for pistachio prices in world markets, but the Iranian stock price index can also be a reliable source for determining international prices. The area under pistachio cultivation in Khorasan is increasing due to the tariffs imposed on the import of American agricultural goods to China.

Some pistachio market participants have renamed Faizabad, California.

== Notable people ==
- Iranian cleric Abu al-Qasim Yaqoubi is from the area
- The prominent Moeini Feizabadi family hails from the city
