= Aliabad-e Olya, Razavi Khorasan =

Village in Razavi Khorasan province, Iran

Aliabad-e Olya Persian: علي ابادعليا
- Village
- Location within Iran
- Coordinates: 35°13′48″N 58°52′44″E
- Country: Iran
- Province: Razavi Khorasan
- County: Mahvelat
- District: Shadmehr
- Rural District: Azghand

Population (2016)
  - Total: 560
- Time zone: UTC+3:30 (IRST)

Aliabad-e Olya (Persian: علي ابادعليا) (Note: Also romanized as ‘Alīābād-e ‘Olyā; also known as ‘Alīābād-e Bālā) is a village in Azghand Rural District of Shadmehr District in Mahvelat County, Razavi Khorasan province, Iran.

== Demographics ==
=== Population ===
At the time of the 2006 National Census, the village's population was 644 in 156 households. The following census in 2011 counted 637 people in 192 households. The 2016 census measured the population of the village as 560 people in 173 households.
