= Sheikh Jarah Mosque =

Mosque in Sheikh Jarrah, Jerusalem

Coordinates: 31°47′25″N 35°13′45″E

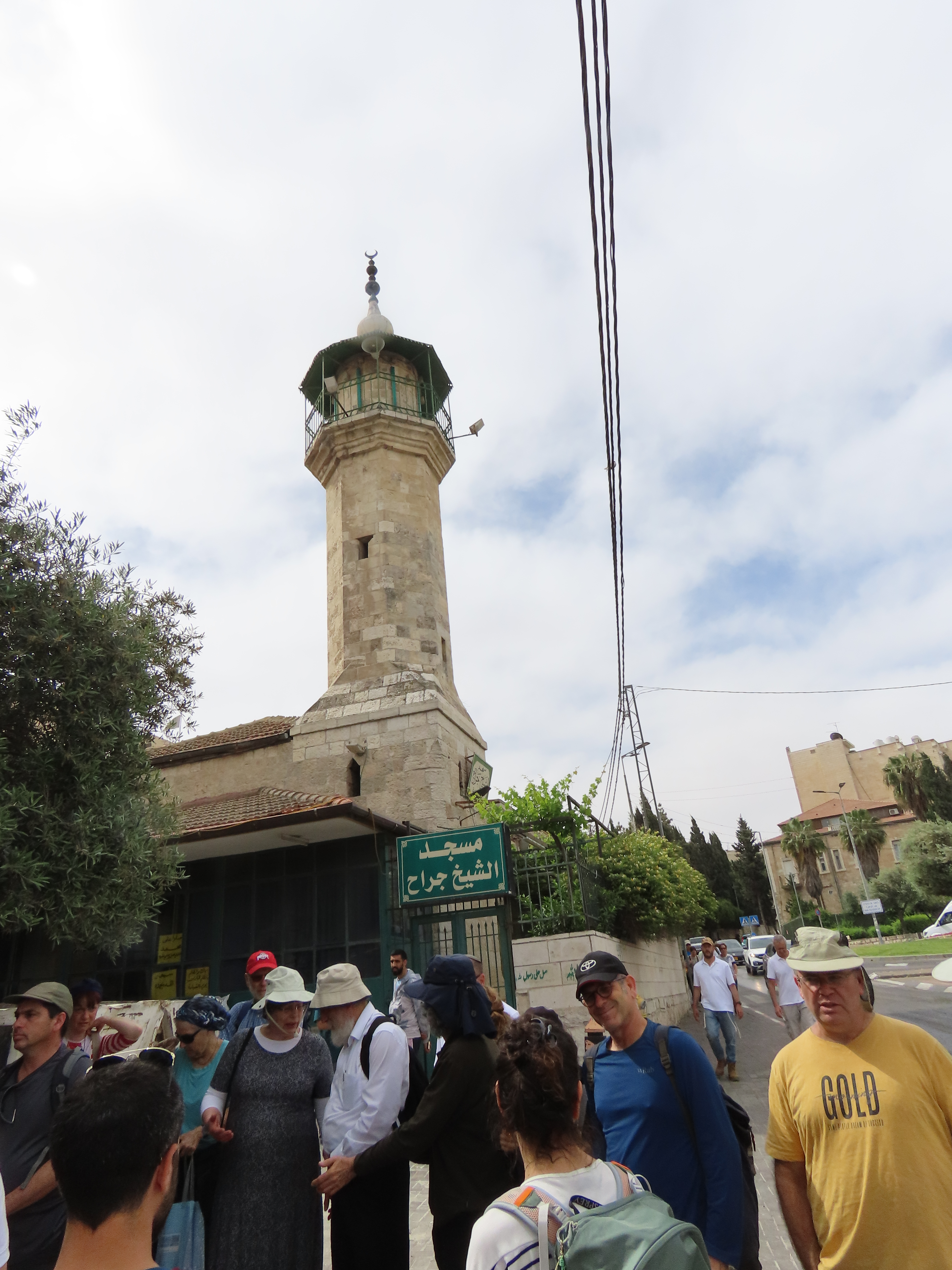

Location
- Location: Jerusalem
- Interactive map of Sheikh Jarah Mosque

Sheikh Jarah Mosque (Arabic: مسجد الشيخ جراح) is a historic mosque in Jerusalem, located in the Sheikh Jarrah neighborhood on Nablus Road. The mosque is historically associated with the Zawiya al-Jarrahiyya, established by the Ayyubid emir Hussam al-Din al-Jarrahi ibn Sharaf al-Din Isa al-Jarrahi.

== History ==
The present mosque dates to the late 19th century. Historical and architectural sources state that it was built in 1886, during the late Ottoman period. The mosque is associated with the site of the Zawiya al-Jarrahiyya and the tomb of its founder, Hussam al-Din al-Jarrahi.

== Description ==
The mosque is a small building with a minaret, located near the tomb of Husam al-Din al-Jarrahi. It remains in use for Muslim prayer and is considered a historic Islamic landmark in the Sheikh Jarrah neighborhood.

== See also ==
- List of mosques in Jerusalem
- Hussam al-Din al-Jarrahi
- Sheikh Jarrah

== Gallery ==
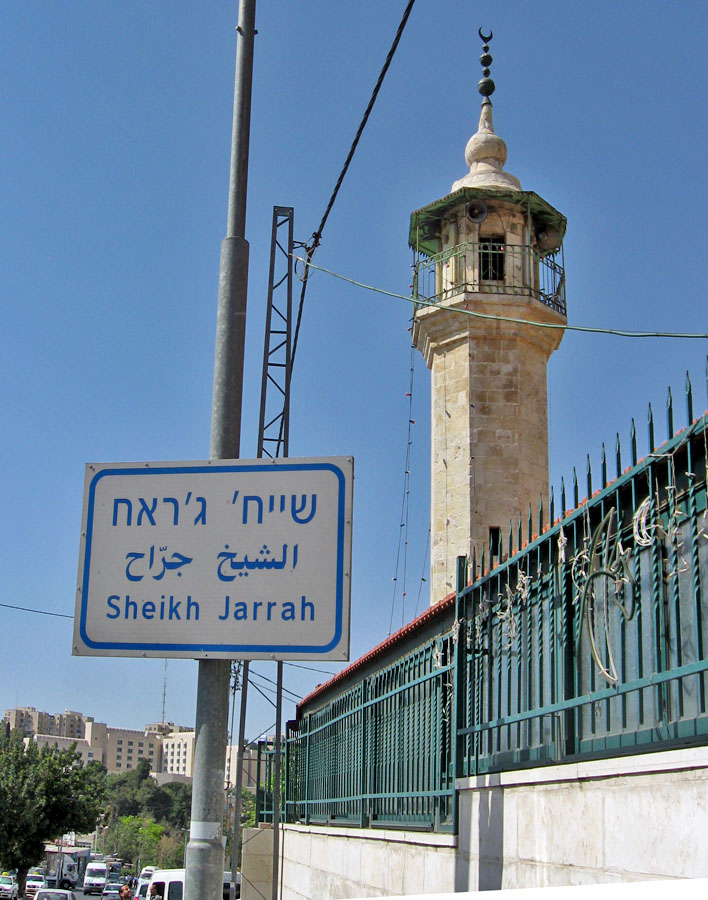
Entrance to Sheikh Jarrah neighborhood in East Jerusalem

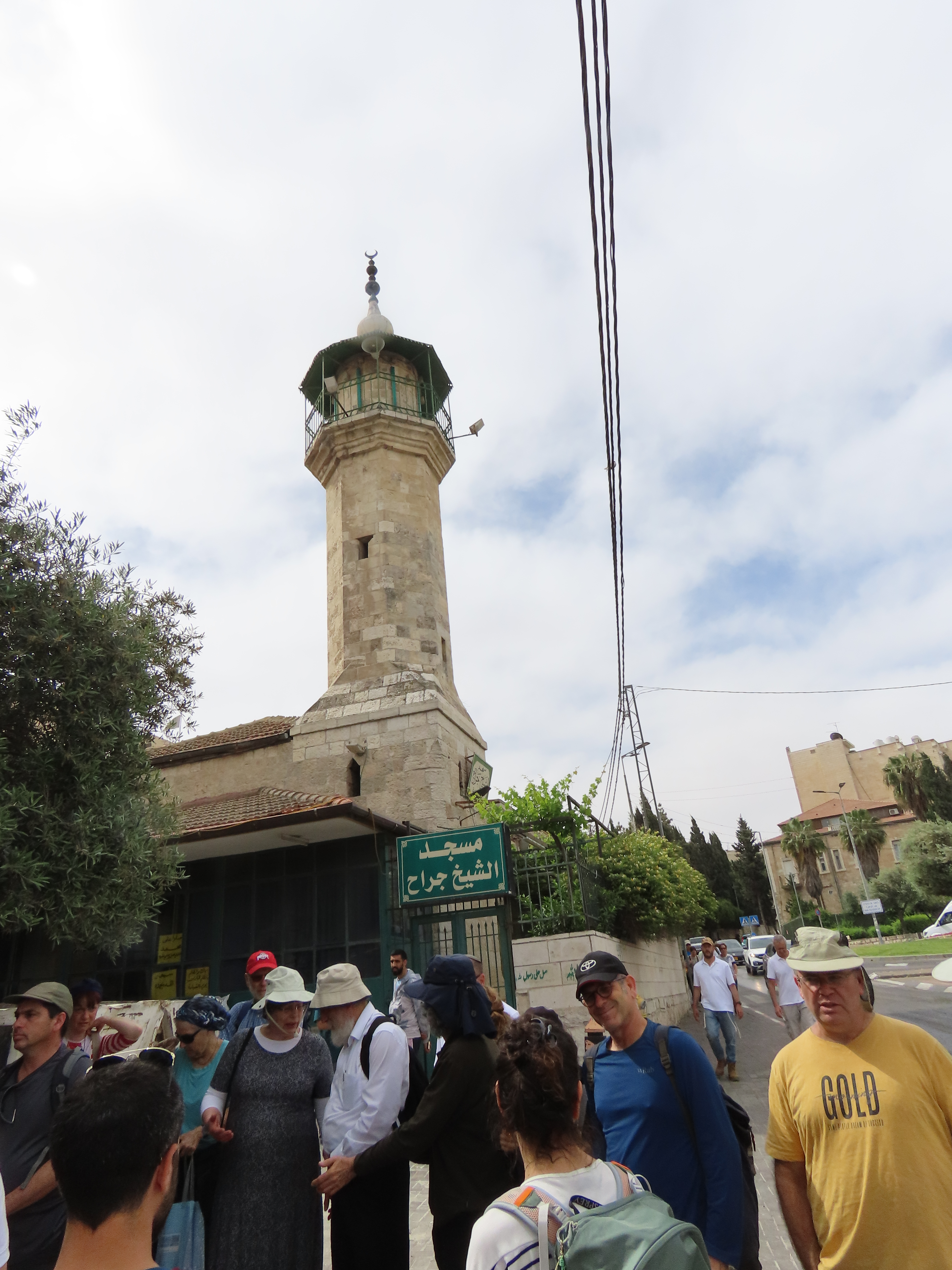
Sheikh Jarrah Mosque in Jerusalem

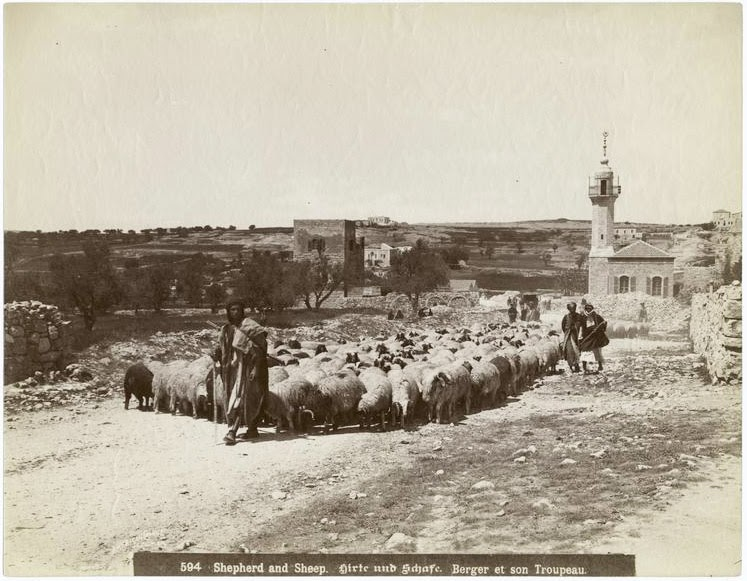
Sheikh Jarrah and Qasr al-Amawi flour mill in Jerusalem, circa 1900

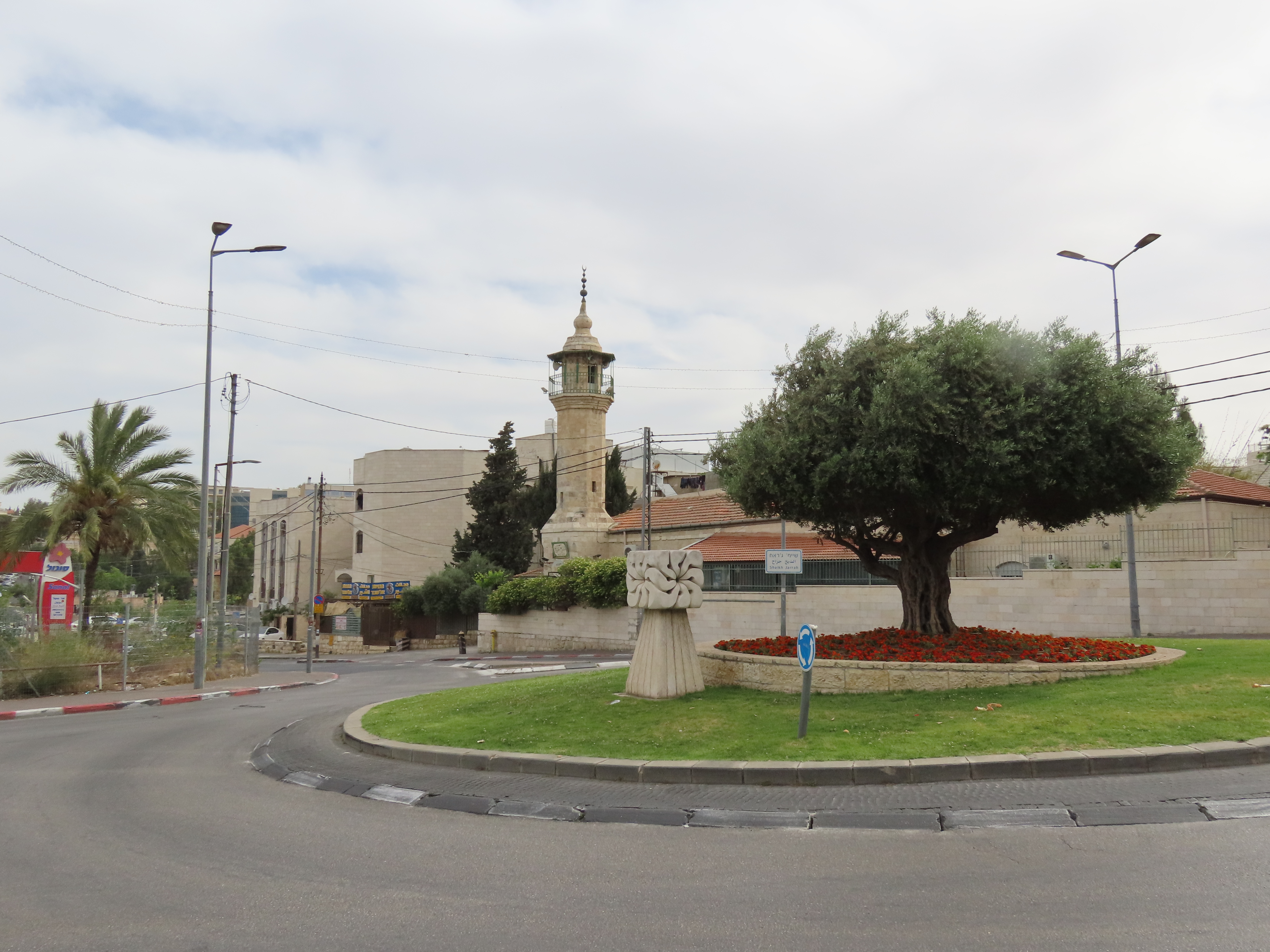
Sheikh Jarrah Mosque in Jerusalem

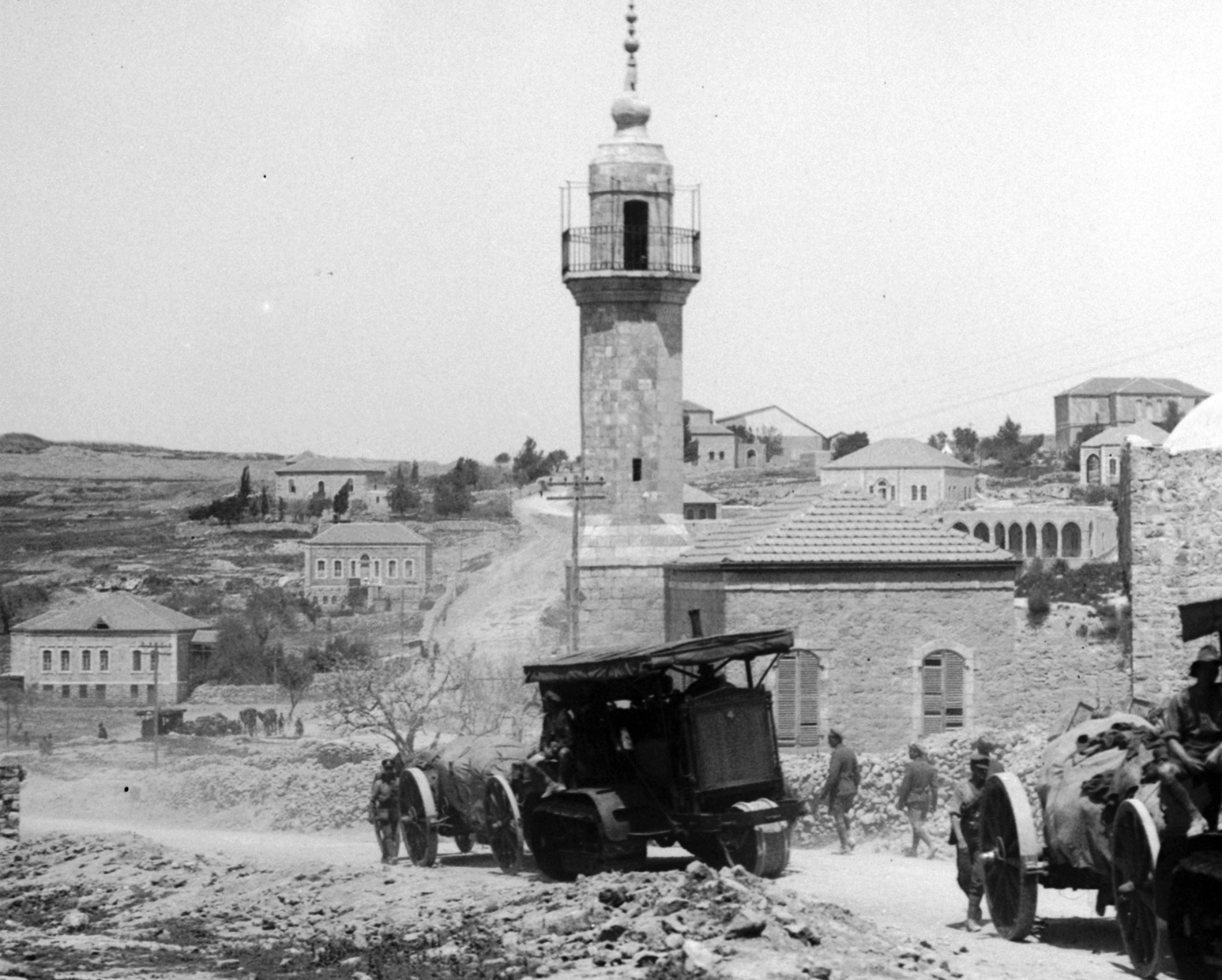
A photograph of British artillery passing through Jerusalem in 1936. The Sheikh Jarrah Mosque can be seen in the background.
