= Abdolabad, Mahvelat =

City in Razavi Khorasan province, Iran

Abdolabad Persian: عبدل اباد
- City
- Location within Iran
- Coordinates: 35°04′06″N 58°47′48″E
- Country: Iran
- Province: Razavi Khorasan
- County: Mahvelat
- District: Central
- Established as a city: 2024

Population (2016)
  - Total: 5,618
- Time zone: UTC+3:30 (IRST)

Abdolabad (Persian: عبدل اباد) (Note: Also romanized as ‘Abdolābād) is a city in the Central District of Mahvelat County, Razavi Khorasan province, Iran. As a village, it was the capital of Howmeh Rural District until its capital was transferred to the village of Hasanabad.

== Population ==
At the time of the 2006 National Census, the village's population was 5,561 in 1,435 households, when it was a village in Howmeh Rural District. The following census in 2011 counted 5,830 people in 1,736 households. The 2016 census measured the population of the village as 5,618 people in 1,739 households, the most populous in its rural district.

Abdolabad was converted to a city in 2024.
