= Aliabad, Kaftarak =

Aliabad علي اباد
- Village
- Location within Iran
- Coordinates: 29°34′32″N 52°40′17″E
- Country: Iran
- Province: Fars
- County: Shiraz
- Bakhsh: Central
- Rural District: Kaftarak

Population (2006)
  - Total: 638
- Time zone: UTC+3:30 (IRST)
  - Summer (DST): UTC+4:30 (IRDT)

Aliabad (Persian: علي اباد, also Romanized as 'Alīābād; also known as 'Alīābād-e Pā’īn and 'Alīābād Pāīn Tūl) is a village in Kaftarak Rural District, in the Central District of Shiraz County, Fars province, Iran. At the 2006 census, its population was 638, in 174 families.
