= Khvajeh Jarrah =

Khvajeh Jarrah خواجه جراح
- Village
- Location within Iran
- Coordinates: 36°39′43″N 59°02′29″E
- Country: Iran
- Province: Razavi Khorasan
- County: Chenaran
- Bakhsh: Central
- Rural District: Chenaran

Population (2006)
  - Total: 335
- Time zone: UTC+3:30 (IRST)
  - Summer (DST): UTC+4:30 (IRDT)

Khvajeh Jarrah (Persian: خواجه جراح, also Romanized as Khvājeh Jarrāḩ) is a village in Chenaran Rural District, in the Central District of Chenaran County, Razavi Khorasan Province, Iran. At the 2006 census, its population was 335, in 100 families.
