= Nouri al-Jarrah =

Nouri Al-Jarrah
- Born: January 27, 1956 (age 70)
- Occupations: Writer and director of the center for arabic geographical literature-exploration prospects
- Known for: Writer, poetry, Articles (Al Katiba)

Nouri al-Jarrah (Arabic: نوري الجراح; born 1956 in Damascus) is a Syrian-British poet and journalist.

== Life and career ==
Born in Damascus in 1956, he has lived in exile since the early eighties, moving to London in 1986 and is known as one of the most influential contemporary poets of the Arabic-speaking world. He has founded several literary magazines including “Al-Naqid” (1988–1992), “Al-Katiba” recorded as the first monthly cultural review for female writers in the Arab world (1993–1995), “Al-Rihla” (as of 1995), and “Al-Jadeed” (as of 2015). His poetry has been published in 16 collections, many of which have been awarded prizes in various parts of the Arab world, including The Boy (1982), Ode to a Voice (1990), Hamlet’s Gardens (2003), and Noah’s Despair (2014). Jarrah explains that he "approached poetry as a rebel, whose hope of changing the world had been lost. After engaging with a failed political movement, I was at a standstill."

In addition to a long line of participation in international poetry festivals he has enjoyed the title of honorary guest to share his poetry by many influential institutes including: New York University, Sprachsalz International Literature Festival, Al-Shaikh Ibraheem Centre of Bahrain, Brown University of Boston, Tetouan Poetry Festival during which the cultural ministry of Morocco presented him with the keys to the city, and many others. His poems present his vision of poetry and life, to which he has lent a unique voice over the years. His verse leans on a variety of cultural sources, with a particular way of focusing on mythology, folktales, and legends while reflecting on metaphysical considerations and deep, existential questions—most recently, the Syrian Civil War and the resulting refugee crisis. Jarrah’s literature has been translated into English, Persian, French, Spanish, Greek, Dutch, Polish, Turkish and Italian. A Boat to Lesbos, published by Banipal Books in 2018, is the first full-length collection of his poetry to appear in English. His opinion pieces and editorials in a stream of magazines and newspapers have inspired lively debate among prominent Arabic writers on the topic of new approaches in poetry and prose.

Al-Jarrah, a dissident of the Syrian regime throughout his career has all the while been politically expressive; from 1981-85 while actively advocating for the Palestinian struggle during the Lebanese civil war, Al-Jarrah served as managing editor for a monthly cultural review in Beirut, with much of the political instabilities forming their impressions on his writings across a landscape of Pan-Arabic publications. in 1998 Al-Jarrah travelled across Algeria, where he would soon produce the only Arabic testimonial documentation of the civil-war titled; “A Bleeding Paradise” which gained international recognition and faced harsh criticism from both the hardcore fundamentalist islamist groups and regime loyalist publications. In 2012; in response and in accordance with the Syrian uprising, he played a primary role in establishing “The Syrian Writers Association” and later in 2017 was voted in as its president.

Nouri Al-Jarrah’s writing has earned him some recognition. In 2008 he was awarded the State’s prize for children’s literature for “The Pillow Book” and In 2000, he co-founded The Centre for Arabic Geographical Literature in Abu Dhabi, which won the Sheikh Zayed Book Award for Publishing and Technology in 2019 for its contribution to the preservation, distribution, and recognition of travel literature.

In 2023, Jarrah publishedThe Stone Serpent, an epic blending together mythology and poetic innovation.

== Family ==
Jarrah's son Rami Jarrah became a prominent activist in early 2011 during the Syrian Uprising, he was cited by international media under the name Alexander Page until he was soon compromised in late 2011 by the Syrian intelligence services.

== Works ==
=== Published ===
· The Boy (Beirut, 1982)

· Aligning with the Voice (London, 1988)

· Ode to a Voice (Köln, 1990)

· Death’s Childhood (Casablanca, 1992)

· A Black Glass (London, 1993)

· Poem and Poem in the Mirror (Beirut, 1995)

· The Ascent of April (Beirut, 1996)

· Hamlet’s Gardens (Beirut, 2003)

· The Road to Damascus and The Persian Garden (Beirut, 2004)

· The Day of Cain (Haifa/Beirut, 2013)

· Noah’s Despair (Beirut, 2014)

· Abel’s Elegies (Beirut, 2015)

· Four Elegies (Istanbul, 2016)

· A Boat to Lesbos (Mailand, 2016)

· Une Barque pour Lesbos (Les Edition Moires Paris, 2016)

· Le désespoir de Noé (Les Edition Moires, Paris, 2017)

· No war in Troy (Milano, 2020)
