= Hussam al-Din al-Jarrahi =

Ayyubid emir and personal physician to Saladin

Sheikh Hussam al-Din al-Jarrahi
- حسام الدين الجراحي
- Born: Unknown
- Died: 1202 CE (Ṣafar 598 AH); Jerusalem, Ayyubid Sultanate
- Burial place: Sheikh Jarrah, Jerusalem
- Occupations: Emir, physician

Hussam al-Din al-Jarrahi (Arabic: حسام الدين الجراحي; died 1202 CE) was an emir and the personal physician of Saladin, who founded the Ayyubid dynasty and rose to become a prominent Muslim leader during the Crusades. Due to his extensive work in medicine, Hussam received the title of jarrah (جراح), meaning "surgeon" in the Arabic language.

Although his exact date of birth is unknown, Hussam was primarily active during the 12th century; he established a Sufi-focused zawiya known as the Zawiya Jarrahiyya in Jerusalem. Hussam was buried on the grounds of the school, which is today located in the East Jerusalem neighbourhood of Sheikh Jarrah, for which he serves as the namesake. In 1202, a tomb was built on his burial site and subsequently became a destination for Muslim mystics and visitors.

== See also ==
- Sheikh Jarrah, the Palestinian neighbourhood in East Jerusalem named after Hussam
- Sheikh Jarrah property dispute, part of the protracted Israeli–Palestinian conflict
- Sheikh Jarah Mosque
