= Aliabad-e Olya, Kerman =

Village in Kerman, Iran

Aliabad-e Olya علي ابادعليا
- Village
- Location within Iran
- Coordinates: 28°07′14″N 57°54′21″E
- Country: Iran
- Province: Kerman
- County: Rudbar-e Jonubi
- Bakhsh: Central
- Rural District: Rudbar

Population (2006)
  - Total: 655
- Time zone: UTC+3:30 (IRST)
  - Summer (DST): UTC+4:30 (IRDT)

Aliabad-e Olya (Persian: علي ابادعليا, also Romanized as ‘Alīābād-e ‘Olyā) is a village in Rudbar Rural District, in the Central District of Rudbar-e Jonubi County, Kerman Province, Iran. In 2006, its population was 655, in 150 families.
