= Aliabad-e Olya, Lorestan =

Aliabad-e Olya علي ابادعليا
- Village
- Location within Iran
- Coordinates: 33°47′46″N 48°13′39″E
- Country: Iran
- Province: Lorestan
- County: Selseleh
- Bakhsh: Central
- Rural District: Doab

Population (2006)
  - Total: 47
- Time zone: UTC+3:30 (IRST)
  - Summer (DST): UTC+4:30 (IRDT)

Aliabad-e Olya (Persian: علي ابادعليا, also Romanized as ‘Alīābād-e ‘Olyā; also known as ‘Alīābād and Alīāhād) is a village in Doab Rural District, in the Central District of Selseleh County, Lorestan Province, Iran. At the 2006 census, its population was 47, in 12 families.
