= Aliabad-e Sofla, Rudbar-e Jonubi =

Aliabad-e Sofla علي ابادسفلي
- Village
- Location within Iran
- Coordinates: 28°06′30″N 57°55′29″E
- Country: Iran
- Province: Kerman
- County: Rudbar-e Jonubi
- Bakhsh: Central
- Rural District: Rudbar

Population (2006)
  - Total: 294
- Time zone: UTC+3:30 (IRST)
  - Summer (DST): UTC+4:30 (IRDT)

Aliabad-e Sofla (Persian: علي ابادسفلي, also Romanized as ‘Alīābād-e Soflá) is a village in Rudbar Rural District, in the Central District of Rudbar-e Jonubi County, Kerman Province, Iran. At the 2006 census, its population was 294, in 52 families.
