= Aliabad-e Avval =

Village in Kermanshah, Iran

Aliabad-e Avval علي اباداول
- Village
- Location within Iran
- Coordinates: 34°28′54″N 48°00′19″E
- Country: Iran
- Province: Kermanshah
- County: Kangavar
- Bakhsh: Central
- Rural District: Gowdin

Population (2006)
  - Total: 284
- Time zone: UTC+3:30 (IRST)
  - Summer (DST): UTC+4:30 (IRDT)

Aliabad-e Avval (Persian: علي اباداول, also Romanized as ‘Alīābād-e Avval; also known as ‘Alīābād and ‘Alīābād-e ‘Olyā) is a village in Gowdin Rural District, in the Central District of Kangavar County, Kermanshah Province, Iran. At the 2006 census, its population was 284, in 69 families.
