= Aliabad-e Sofla, Lorestan =

Aliabad-e Sofla علي ابادسفلي
- Village
- Location within Iran
- Coordinates: 33°47′57″N 48°13′43″E
- Country: Iran
- Province: Lorestan
- County: Selseleh
- Bakhsh: Central
- Rural District: Doab

Population (2006)
  - Total: 125
- Time zone: UTC+3:30 (IRST)
  - Summer (DST): UTC+4:30 (IRDT)

Aliabad-e Sofla (Persian: علي ابادسفلي, also Romanized as ‘Alīābād-e Soflá; also known as ‘Alīābād) is a village in Doab Rural District, in the Central District of Selseleh County, Lorestan Province, Iran. At the 2006 census, its population was 125, in 23 families.
