= Jarrah (surgeon) =

Jarrah (Arabic: الجراح, Arabic: جراح) is the Arabic-language word for surgeon.

== Arabic ==
The word Jarrah means surgeon in the Arabic-language. The root of the word is derived from the Arabic word "جرح" (jarh), meaning "injury." The Arabic word for surgery, Jiraha, shares the same root.

Jarrah is a common surname in the Levant, including in Palestine, Syria, and Lebanon.

== Deccani-Urdu ==
In Deccani-Urdu the word Jarrah is termed for the Orthopaedists who are trained in the discipline of Unani medicine. In South India and particularly Hyderabad, India Jarrah are the bone setters, adjust joint dislocations and physiotherapists, they use non-surgical means to treat fractures, dislocation, sports injuries and set the bone without applying any plaster. Jarrah do not rely on latest technology of treatment like X-ray or any diagnosis and uses the art of treating orthopaedic problems with bare hands and supplementing it with regular essential oil massages and specially prepared Unani medicine pastes, this is a long-term treatment, with minimum 3 weeks depending on the seriousness of case.
