= Nahr-e Jarrah =

Nahr-e Jarrah نهرجراح
- Village
- Location within Iran
- Coordinates: 30°39′10″N 48°46′00″E
- Country: Iran
- Province: Khuzestan
- County: Shadegan
- Bakhsh: Central
- Rural District: Buzi

Population (2006)
  - Total: 432
- Time zone: UTC+3:30 (IRST)
  - Summer (DST): UTC+4:30 (IRDT)

Nahr-e Jarrah (Persian: نهرجراح, also Romanized as Nahr-e Jarrāḩ; also known as Nahr-e Jarrāḩ-e ‘Olyā) is a village in Buzi Rural District, in the Central District of Shadegan County, Khuzestan Province, Iran. At the 2006 census, its population was 432, in 76 families.
