= Zahirabad-e Nahr Mian =

Village in Markazi, Iran

Zahirabad-e Nahr Mian ظهيرابادنهرميان
- Village
- Location within Iran
- Coordinates: 34°02′48″N 49°11′34″E
- Country: Iran
- Province: Markazi
- County: Shazand
- Bakhsh: Zalian
- Rural District: Nahr-e Mian

Population (2006)
  - Total: 249
- Time zone: UTC+3:30 (IRST)
  - Summer (DST): UTC+4:30 (IRDT)

Zahirabad-e Nahr Mian (Persian: ظهيرابادنهرميان, also Romanized as Z̧ahīrābād-e Nahr Mīān; also known as Z̧ahīrābād and Z̧ahīrābād-e Qūsh Tappeh) is a village in Nahr-e Mian Rural District, Zalian District, Shazand County, Markazi Province, Iran. At the 2006 census, its population was 249, in 56 families.
