= Aliabad-e Dovvom =

Village in Kermanshah, Iran

Aliabad-e Dovvom علي اباددوم
- Village
- Location within Iran
- Coordinates: 34°28′51″N 48°00′51″E
- Country: Iran
- Province: Kermanshah
- County: Kangavar
- Bakhsh: Central
- Rural District: Gowdin

Population (2006)
  - Total: 119
- Time zone: UTC+3:30 (IRST)
  - Summer (DST): UTC+4:30 (IRDT)

Aliabad-e Dovvom (Persian: علي اباددوم, also Romanized as ‘Alīābād-e Dovvom; also known as ‘Alīābād-e Soflá) is a village in Gowdin Rural District, in the Central District of Kangavar County, Kermanshah Province, Iran. At the 2006 census, its population was 119, in 27 families.

The population of Aliabad is predominantly of Shi'a Kurdish origin. Aliabad's society is non-tribal.
