= Aliabad-e Sofla, Khuzestan =

Aliabad-e Sofla علي ابادسفلي
- Village
- Country: Iran
- Province: Khuzestan
- County: Lali
- Bakhsh: Hati
- Rural District: Hati

Population (2006)
  - Total: 125
- Time zone: UTC+3:30 (IRST)
  - Summer (DST): UTC+4:30 (IRDT)

Aliabad-e Sofla (Persian: علي ابادسفلي, also Romanized as ‘Ālīābād-e Soflá) is a village in Hati Rural District, Hati District, Lali County, Khuzestan Province, Iran. At the 2006 census, its population was 125, in 17 families.
