= Aliabad-e Sadat, Jiroft =

Village in Kerman province, Iran

Aliabad-e Sadat Persian: علي ابادسادات
- Village
- Location within Iran
- Coordinates: 28°13′30″N 57°28′01″E
- Country: Iran
- Province: Kerman
- County: Jiroft
- District: Esmaili
- Rural District: Esmaili

Population (2016)
  - Total: 570
- Time zone: UTC+3:30 (IRST)

Aliabad-e Sadat (Persian: علي ابادسادات) (Note: Also romanized as ‘Alīābād-e Sādāt; also known as ‘Alīābād, ‘Alīābād-e Pā’īn, and ‘Alīābād Pā’īn) is a village in Esmaili Rural District of Esmaili District, Jiroft County, Kerman province, Iran.

== Demographics ==
=== Population ===
At the time of the 2006 National Census, the village's population was 500 in 97 households, when it was in Anbarabad County. The following census in 2011 counted 527 people in 131 households, by which time the district had been separated from the county to join Jiroft County. The 2016 census measured the population of the village as 570 people in 179 households.
