= Rami Jarrah =

Syrian political activist (born 1984)

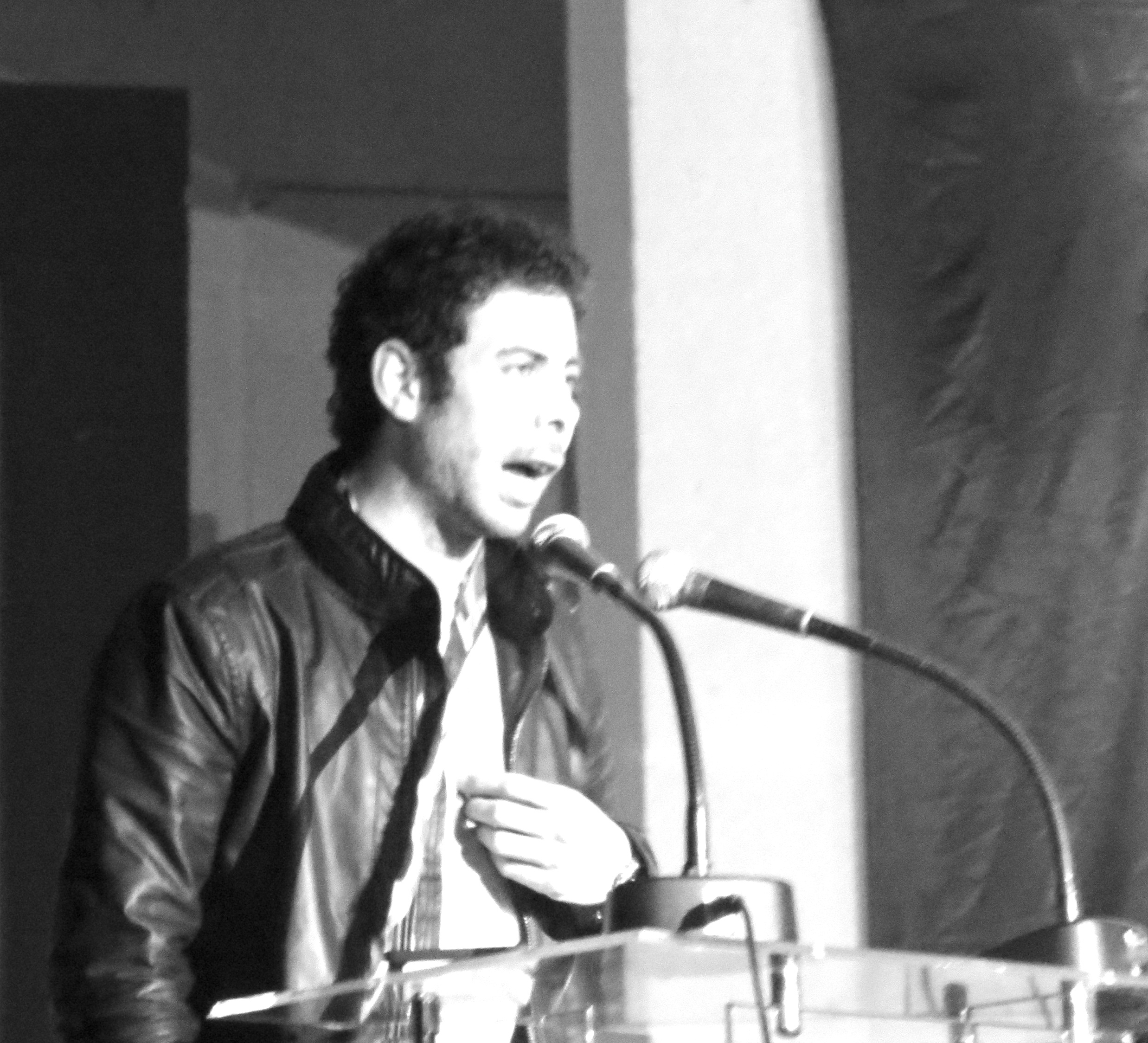
- Rami Jarrah
- Born: June 11, 1984 (age 42)
- Occupations: Pro-Democracy Activist, Media Trainer
- Known for: Pseudonym: Alexander Page, political activism, reporting Syrian civil war

Rami Jarrah (Arabic: رامي الجراح) (born 11 June 1984 Nicosia) is a Syrian political activist who was often cited by international media outlets under the pseudonym Alexander Page during the Syrian civil war. The barring of most international journalists from Syria by the government made such information particularly valuable. He was "outed" by the Syrian intelligence some time in September/October 2011 and fled to Egypt with his wife and daughter where he posts comments to Facebook and Twitter and continues to use the name Alexander Page.

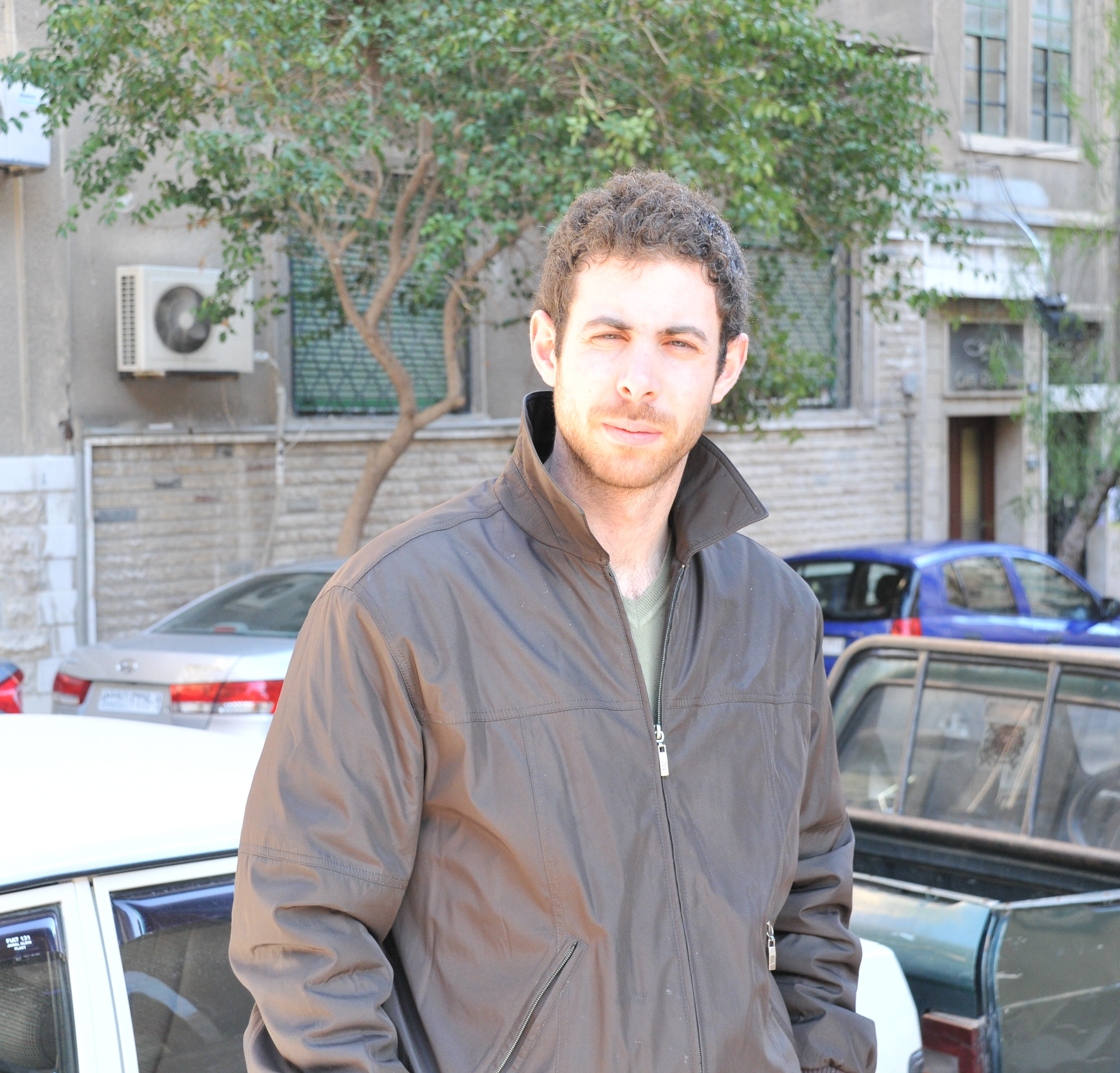
Rami Jarrah (Damascus, Syria - feb 2011

Rami Jarrah is Syrian-British and lived most of his early life in London. He first visited Damascus, his parents' hometown, in 2004 where he was detained and placed under a 3-year travel ban by Syrian authorities. Between 2004 and 2007 he was interrogated by numerous intelligence branches regarding his relationship with his parents, both of whom were long-time opposers to the Ba'ath party. He was arrested on 25 March 2011 during the Syrian civil war whilst filming a protest in the Umayyad Mosque, Jarrah was tortured for three days in a Syrian security branch and then released upon signing a document admitting he was a terrorist sent from abroad.

In late 2011, Jarrah was arrested in Doha airport and almost sent back to Syria, he admits making it through the ordeal only because fellow Twitter users began a large campaign on the social network.

According to NPR, before he became an activist, Jarrah was a "successful businessman with a comfortable life" but who quit his job "rather than join a pro-government rally".

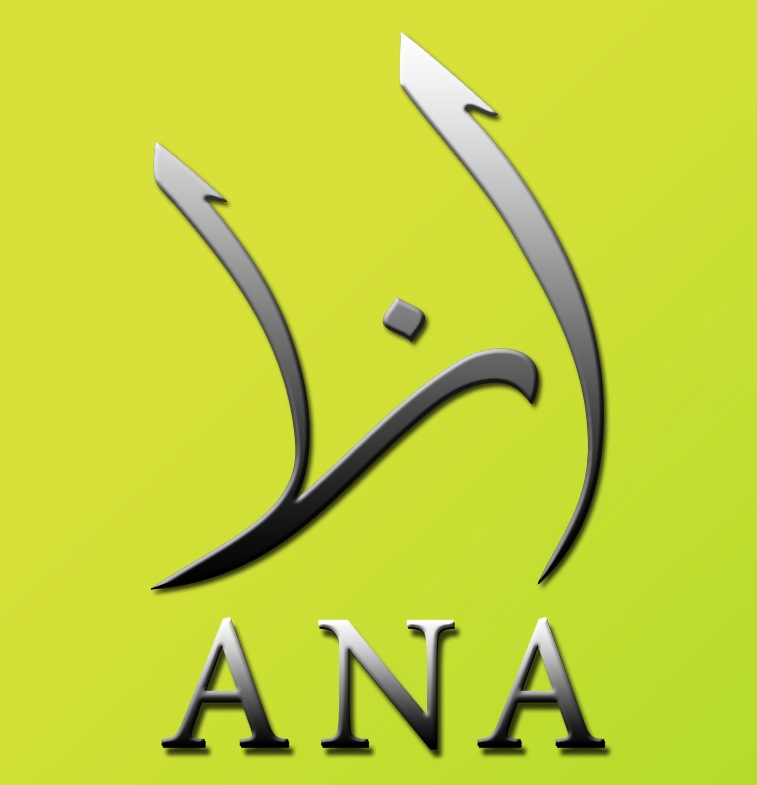
ANA New-Media Association main logo

In 2012, Jarrah along with Deiaa Dughmoch established The ANA New-Media Association claiming it would become Syria's first independent free media agency. The office was established in Cairo given the dangers of doing so in Syria due to the events of the Syrian civil war and the Ba'ath governments crackdown on independent free media.

== Awards ==
Jarrah was awarded one of the 2012 International Press Freedom Award (IPFA) from Canadian Journalists for Free Expression for his coverage of the Syrian civil war. The awards are presented annually to journalists who have demonstrated their commitment to human rights and honest reporting, and who have overcome tremendous obstacles in their work. The award is presented at the CJFE Gala: A Night to Honour Courageous Reporting, held in Toronto, Canada.

== Family ==
Jarrah's father, Nouri al-Jarrah a long time Syrian dissident due to the Ba'ath government's dismantlement of the Communist Party in Syria, He established a literary magazine named Al-Katiba of which 15 issues have been published and has also published a number of poem collections. He is also a director of The Center for Arabic Geographical Literature-Exploration Prospects which is based in Abu Dhabi and London. The institute has published a number of works relating to Arab travel literature, most significantly Hassan Taufik al Idl travels in late 19th century Germany.

Jarrah's mother Lina Tibi became a member of the Syrian National Council a political council formed during the Syrian civil war to serve as a representative of the opposition movement against Bashar al-Assad's rule. Tibi is also a poet and has published a number of poetry collections in the Arabic language.

== Life ==
Rami Jarrah was born in Nicosia Cyprus 11 June 1984, his parents both Syrian exiles, were forced to flee to the island during the war in Lebanon 1982. In 1986 Jarrah's family moved to London where he spent the next 15 years of his life. in 2004 he visited his home country facing arrest and a travel ban that then led him to settle down. Jarrah then began a successful business career as an import-export consultant for one of Syria's largest distribution companies: Modern Technology Co., Ltd. His career ended in early 2011 during the Syrian civil war due to a fallout with the company's Managing Director, Nabil Al Attar, over a political dispute. In October 2011 Jarrah fled Syria after learning he had been compromised by Syrian intelligence services for his participation in the uprising. his Pseudonym Alexander Page was used to disguise himself whilst speaking out to international media. Jarrah moved to Cairo in late 2011, he participated in the Mohammad Mahmoud events just by Tahrir Square. 19 November 2011 Egyptian authorities accused Jarrah under his pseudonym of being an Israeli Agent sent to cause disruption, this was as a result of a live stream video he recorded of Egyptian Central Security Forces abusing peaceful demonstrators.

== See also ==
- Syrian civil war
