= Eskandarabad, West Azerbaijan =

Eskandarabad اسكندراباد
- Village
- Location within Iran
- Coordinates: 37°42′22″N 44°44′20″E
- Country: Iran
- Province: West Azerbaijan
- County: Urmia
- Bakhsh: Sumay-ye Beradust
- Rural District: Beradust

Population (2006)
  - Total: 119
- Time zone: UTC+3:30 (IRST)
  - Summer (DST): UTC+4:30 (IRDT)

Eskandarabad (Persian: اسكندراباد, also Romanized as Eskandarābād) is a village in Beradust Rural District, Sumay-ye Beradust District, Urmia County, West Azerbaijan Province, Iran. At the 2006 census, its population was 119, in 26 families.
