= Aliabad-e Olya, Kermanshah =

Village in Kermanshah, Iran

Aliabad-e Olya علي ابادعليا
- Village
- Location within Iran
- Coordinates: 34°17′49″N 46°46′09″E
- Country: Iran
- Province: Kermanshah
- County: Kermanshah
- Bakhsh: Mahidasht
- Rural District: Mahidasht

Population (2006)
  - Total: 29
- Time zone: UTC+3:30 (IRST)
  - Summer (DST): UTC+4:30 (IRDT)

Aliabad-e Olya (Persian: علي ابادعليا, also Romanized as ‘Alīābād-e ‘Olyā; also known as ‘Alīābād-e Bālā) is a village in Mahidasht Rural District, Mahidasht District, Kermanshah County, Kermanshah Province, Iran. At the 2006 census, its population was 29, in 8 families.
