= Aliabad-e Sofla, Zarand =

Aliabad-e Sofla علي ابادسفلي
- Village
- Location within Iran
- Coordinates: 30°51′04″N 56°30′02″E
- Country: Iran
- Province: Kerman
- County: Zarand
- Bakhsh: Yazdanabad
- Rural District: Yazdanabad

Population (2006)
  - Total: 1,387
- Time zone: UTC+3:30 (IRST)
  - Summer (DST): UTC+4:30 (IRDT)

Aliabad-e Sofla (Persian: علي ابادسفلي, also Romanized as ‘Alīābād-e Soflá; also known as ‘Alīābād and ‘Alīābād-e Pā’īn) is a village in Yazdanabad Rural District, Yazdanabad District, Zarand County, Kerman Province, Iran. At the 2006 census, its population was 1,387, in 343 families.
