= Aliabad, Shahdad =

Aliabad علي اباد
- Village
- Location within Iran
- Coordinates: 30°30′22″N 57°46′47″E
- Country: Iran
- Province: Kerman
- County: Kerman
- Bakhsh: Shahdad
- Rural District: Takab

Population (2006)
  - Total: 232
- Time zone: UTC+3:30 (IRST)
  - Summer (DST): UTC+4:30 (IRDT)

Aliabad (Persian: علي اباد, also Romanized as ‘Alīabād; also known as ‘Alīābād-e ‘Alīrezā Khānī, ‘Alīābād-e Bālā, and ‘Alīābād-e Pā’īn) is a village in Takab Rural District, Shahdad District, Kerman County, Kerman Province, Iran. At the 2006 census, its population was 232, in 52 families.
