= Aliabad-e Sofla, East Azerbaijan =

Village in East Azerbaijan province, Iran

Aliabad-e Sofla علی‌آباد سفلی
- Village
- Location within Iran
- Coordinates: 37°27′07″N 47°06′02″E
- Country: Iran
- Province: East Azerbaijan
- County: Hashtrud
- District: Central
- Rural District: Aliabad

Population (2016)
  - Total: 646
- Time zone: UTC+3:30 (IRST)

Aliabad-e Sofla (Persian: علی‌آباد سفلی) (Note: Also romanized as ‘Alīābād-e Soflá; also known as ‘Alīābād and ‘Alīābād-e Pā’īn) is a village in Aliabad Rural District of the Central District in Hashtrud County, East Azerbaijan province, Iran.

== Demographics ==
=== Population ===
At the time of the 2006 National Census, the village's population was 546 in 126 households. The following census in 2011 counted 568 people in 143 households. The 2016 census measured the population of the village as 646 people in 193 households.
