= Aliabad-e Olya, South Khorasan =

Village in Iran

Aliabad-e Olya علي ابادعليا
- Village
- Location within Iran
- Coordinates: 33°39′50″N 59°05′20″E
- Country: Iran
- Province: South Khorasan
- County: Qaen
- Bakhsh: Central
- Rural District: Qaen

Population (2006)
  - Total: 263
- Time zone: UTC+3:30 (IRST)
  - Summer (DST): UTC+4:30 (IRDT)

Aliabad-e Olya (Persian: علي ابادعليا, also Romanized as ‘Alīābād-e ‘Olyā; also known as ‘Alīābād, ‘Alīābād-e Bālā, ‘Alīābād Chedān, and ‘Alīābād-e Chodān) is a village in Qaen Rural District, in the Central District of Qaen County, South Khorasan Province, Iran. At the 2006 census, its population was 263, in 69 families.
