= Aliabad, Zarand =

Aliabad علي اباد
- Village
- Location within Iran
- Coordinates: 30°41′09″N 56°38′42″E
- Country: Iran
- Province: Kerman
- County: Zarand
- Bakhsh: Central
- Rural District: Vahdat

Population (2006)
  - Total: 1,407
- Time zone: UTC+3:30 (IRST)
  - Summer (DST): UTC+4:30 (IRDT)

Aliabad (Persian: علي اباد, also Romanized as ‘Alīābād; also known as ‘Alīābād-e Bālā and ‘Alīābād-e ‘Olyā) is a village in Vahdat Rural District, in the Central District of Zarand County, Kerman Province, Iran. At the 2006 census, its population was 1,407, in 308 families.
