= Aliabad-e Sofla, South Khorasan =

Aliabad-e Sofla علي ابادسفلي
- Village
- Location within Iran
- Coordinates: 33°40′06″N 59°05′23″E
- Country: Iran
- Province: South Khorasan
- County: Qaen
- Bakhsh: Central
- Rural District: Qaen

Population (2006)
  - Total: 175
- Time zone: UTC+3:30 (IRST)
  - Summer (DST): UTC+4:30 (IRDT)

Aliabad-e Sofla (Persian: علي ابادسفلي, also Romanized as ‘Alīābād-e Soflá; also known as ‘Alīābād-e Pā’īn) is a village in Qaen Rural District, in the Central District of Qaen County, South Khorasan Province, Iran. At the 2006 census, its population was 175, in 44 families.
