= Aliabad-e Sofla, Kermanshah =

Village in Kermanshah, Iran

Aliabad-e Sofla علي ابادسفلي
- Village
- Location within Iran
- Coordinates: 34°18′28″N 46°45′15″E
- Country: Iran
- Province: Kermanshah
- County: Kermanshah
- Bakhsh: Mahidasht
- Rural District: Chaqa Narges

Population (2006)
  - Total: 86
- Time zone: UTC+3:30 (IRST)
  - Summer (DST): UTC+4:30 (IRDT)

Aliabad-e Sofla (Persian: علي ابادسفلي, also Romanized as ‘Alīābād-e Soflá; also known as ‘Alīābād-e Pā'īn) is a village in Chaqa Narges Rural District, Mahidasht District, Kermanshah County, Kermanshah Province, Iran. At the 2006 census, its population was 86, in 18 families.
