= Azghand Rural District =

Rural district in Razavi Khorasan province, Iran

Azghand Rural District Persian: دهستان ازغند
- Rural District
- Location within Iran
- Coordinates: 35°13′N 58°55′E
- Country: Iran
- Province: Razavi Khorasan
- County: Mahvelat
- District: Shadmehr
- Capital: Shadmehr

Population (2016)
  - Total: 7,578
- Time zone: UTC+3:30 (IRST)

Azghand Rural District (Persian: دهستان ازغند) is in Shadmehr District of Mahvelat County, Razavi Khorasan province, Iran. It is administered from the city of Shadmehr.

== Demographics ==
=== Population ===
At the time of the 2006 National Census, the rural district's population was 11,433 in 3,015 households. There were 7,304 inhabitants in 2,316 households at the following census of 2011. The 2016 census measured the population of the rural district as 7,578 in 2,498 households. The most populous of its 17 villages was Azghand, with 1,280 people.

=== Other villages in the rural district ===
- Aliabad-e Olya
- Chenar
- Golestan
- Khvosh Darreh
- Soltanabad
- Zarmehr
