= Central District (Mahvelat County) =

District in Razavi Khorasan province, Iran

Central District (Mahvelat County) Persian: بخش مرکزی شهرستان مه ولات
- District
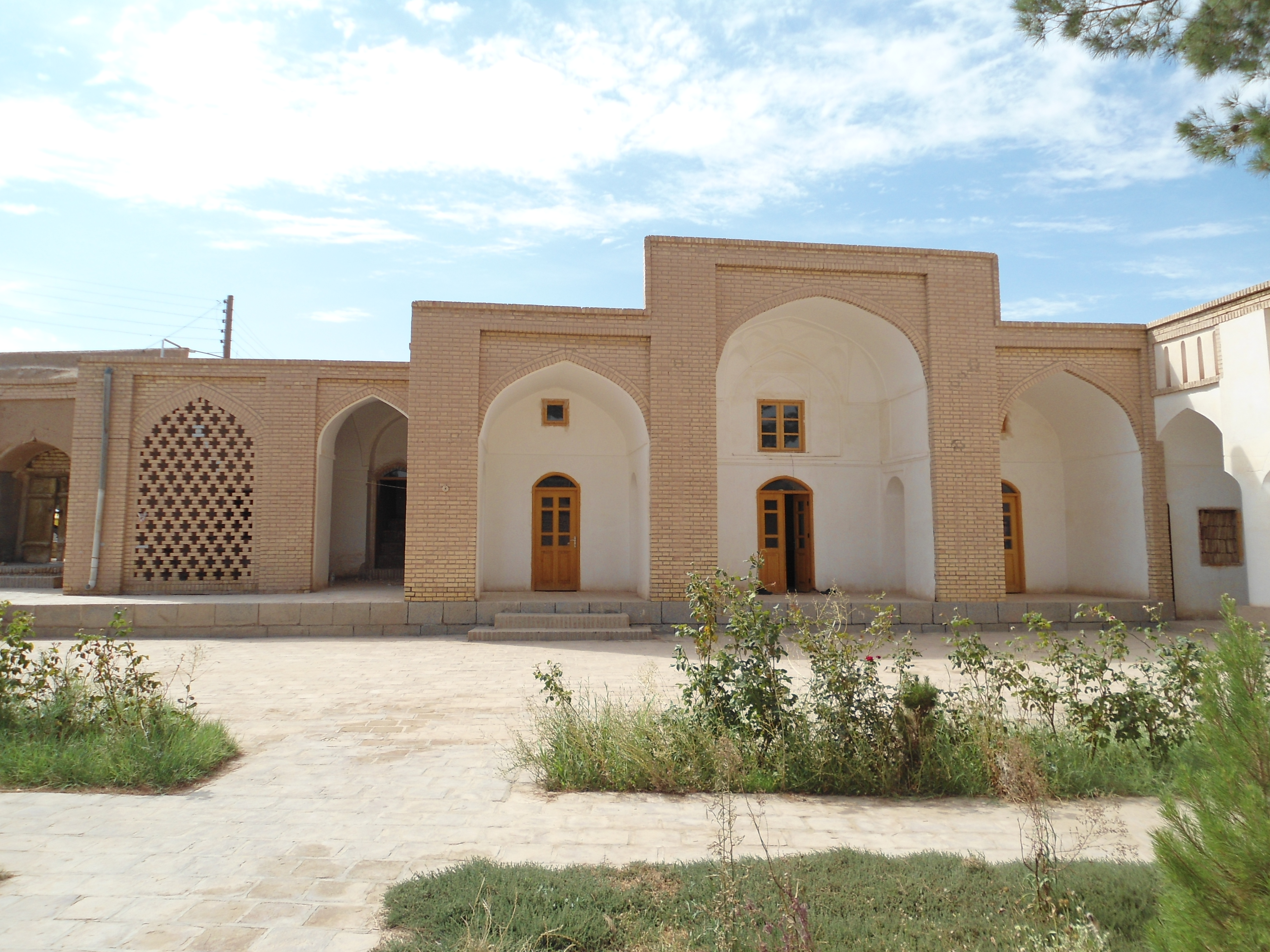
- Shrine and mosque of Abol Said (Abol Kheyr)

- Location within Iran
- Coordinates: 34°54′N 58°41′E
- Country: Iran
- Province: Razavi Khorasan
- County: Mahvelat
- Established: 2005
- Capital: Feyzabad

Population (2016)
  - Total: 35,656
- Time zone: UTC+3:30 (IRST)

The Central District of Mahvelat County (Persian: بخش مرکزی شهرستان مه ولات) is in Razavi Khorasan province, Iran. Its capital is the city of Feyzabad.

== History ==
The village of Abdolabad was converted to a city in 2024.

== Demographics ==
=== Population ===
At the time of the 2006 National Census, the district's population was 31,211 in 8,039 households. The following census in 2011 counted 33,488 people in 9,561 households. The 2016 census measured the population of the district as 35,656 inhabitants in 10,841 households.

=== Administrative divisions ===
Central District (Mahvelat County) Population
Administrative Divisions	2006	2011	2016
Howmeh RD	8,696	9,345	9,344
Mahvelat-e Jonubi RD (Note: Formerly Mahvelat Rural District)	7,794	7,890	8,192
Abdolabad (city) (Note: Became a city after the 2016 census)			
Feyzabad (city)	14,721	16,253	18,120
Total	31,211	33,488	35,656
RD = Rural District
