= Shadmehr District =

District in Razavi Khorasan province, Iran

Shadmehr District Persian: بخش شادمهر
- District
- Location within Iran
- Coordinates: 35°09′N 58°56′E
- Country: Iran
- Province: Razavi Khorasan
- County: Mahvelat
- Established: 2005
- Capital: Shadmehr

Population (2016)
  - Total: 15,753
- Time zone: UTC+3:30 (IRST)

Shadmehr District (Persian: بخش شادمهر) is in Mahvelat County, Razavi Khorasan province, Iran. Its capital is the city of Shadmehr.

== History ==
The village of Shadmehr was converted to a city in 2009.

== Demographics ==
=== Population ===
At the time of the 2006 National Census, the district's population was 15,857 in 4,229 households. The following census in 2011 counted 15,412 people in 4,681 households. The 2016 census measured the population of the district as 15,753 inhabitants in 5,003 households.

=== Administrative divisions ===
Shadmehr District Population
Administrative Divisions	2006	2011	2016
Azghand RD	11,433	7,304	7,578
Mahvelat-e Shomali RD	4,424	4,430	4,350
Shadmehr (city)		3,678	3,825
Total	15,857	15,412	15,753
RD = Rural District
