= Mahvelat County =

County in Razavi Khorasan Province, Iran

Mahvelat County Persian: شهرستان مه ولات
- County
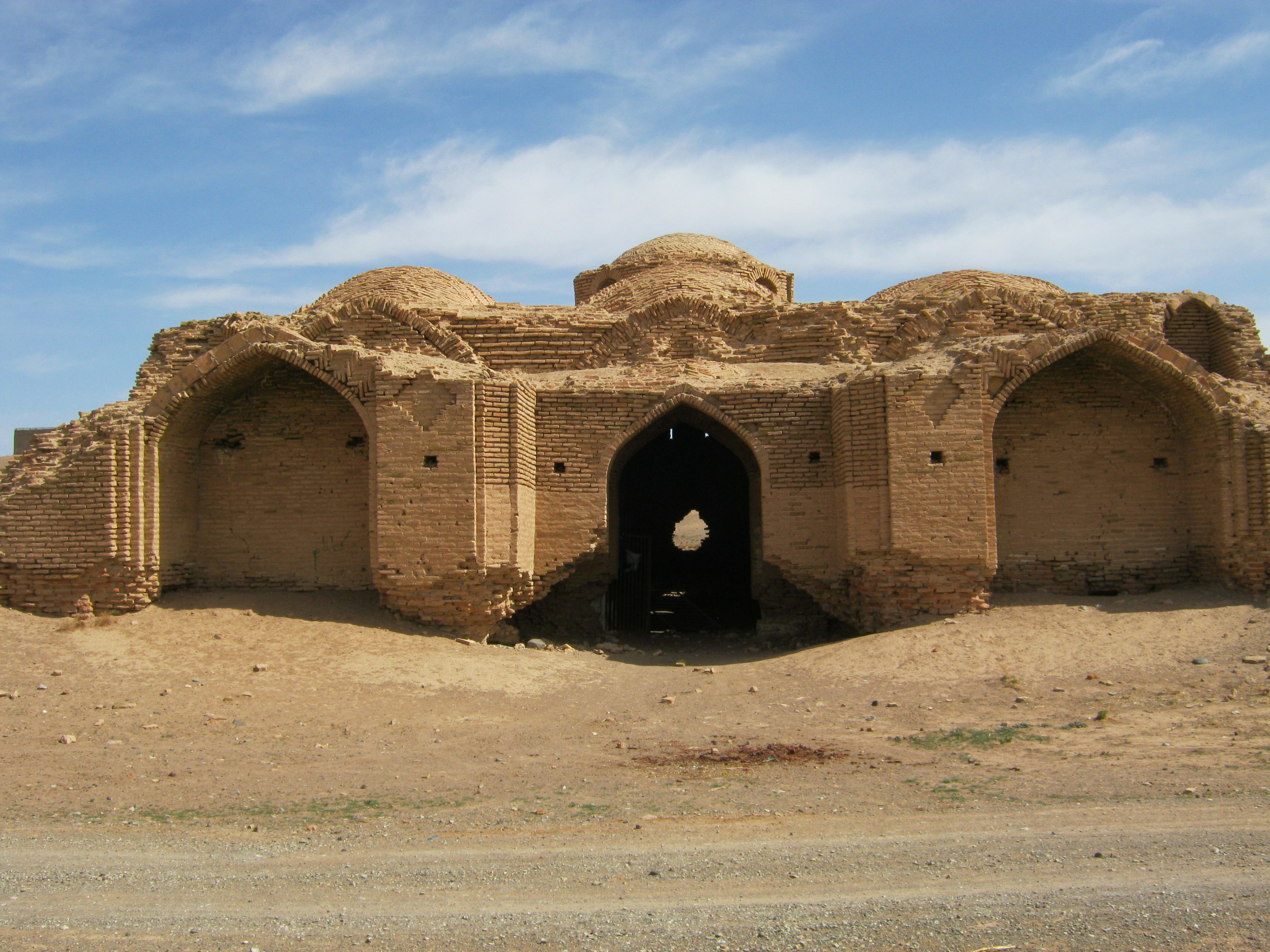
- Zarnukh

- Location of Mahvelat County in Razavi Khorasan province (bottom center, green)

- Location of Razavi Khorasan province in Iran
- Coordinates: 35°02′N 58°40′E
- Country: Iran
- Province: Razavi Khorasan
- Established: 2005
- Capital: Feyzabad
- Districts: Central, Shadmehr

Area
  - Total: 3,317 km^{2} (1,281 sq mi)

Population (2016)
  - Total: 51,409
  - Density: 15.50/km^{2} (40.14/sq mi)
- Time zone: UTC+3:30 (IRST)

Mahvelat County (Persian: شهرستان مه ولات) is in Razavi Khorasan province, Iran. Its capital is the city of Feyzabad.

== History ==
The village of Shadmehr was converted to a city in 2009, and likewise the village of Abdolabad in 2024.

== Demographics ==
=== Population ===
At the time of the 2006 National Census, the county's population was 47,068 in 12,268 households. The following census in 2011 counted 48,900 people in 14,226 households. The 2016 census measured the population of the county as 51,409 in 15,844 households.

=== Administrative divisions ===
Mahvelat County's population history and administrative structure over three consecutive censuses are shown in the following table.

Mahvelat County Population
Administrative Divisions	2006	2011	2016
Central District	31,211	33,488	35,656
Howmeh RD	8,696	9,345	9,344
Mahvelat-e Jonubi RD (Note: Formerly Mahvelat Rural District)	7,794	7,890	8,192
Abdolabad (city) (Note: Became a city after the 2016 census)			
Feyzabad (city)	14,721	16,253	18,120
Shadmehr District	15,857	15,412	15,753
Azghand RD	11,433	7,304	7,578
Mahvelat-e Shomali RD	4,424	4,430	4,350
Shadmehr (city)		3,678	3,825
Total	47,068	48,900	51,409
RD = Rural District

== See also ==
Media related to Mahvelat County at Wikimedia Commons
