= Nojubaran =

Nojubaran نجوبران
- Village
- Location within Iran
- Coordinates: 34°26′35″N 47°25′11″E
- Country: Iran
- Province: Kermanshah
- County: Harsin
- Bakhsh: Bisotun
- Rural District: Cham Chamal

Population (2006)
  - Total: 445
- Time zone: UTC+3:30 (IRST)
  - Summer (DST): UTC+4:30 (IRDT)

Nojubaran (Persian: نجوبران, also Romanized as Nojūbarān; also known as Nūjbarān and Nujubarān) is a village in Cham Chamal Rural District, Bisotun District, Harsin County, Kermanshah Province, Iran. At the 2006 census, its population was 445, in 107 families.

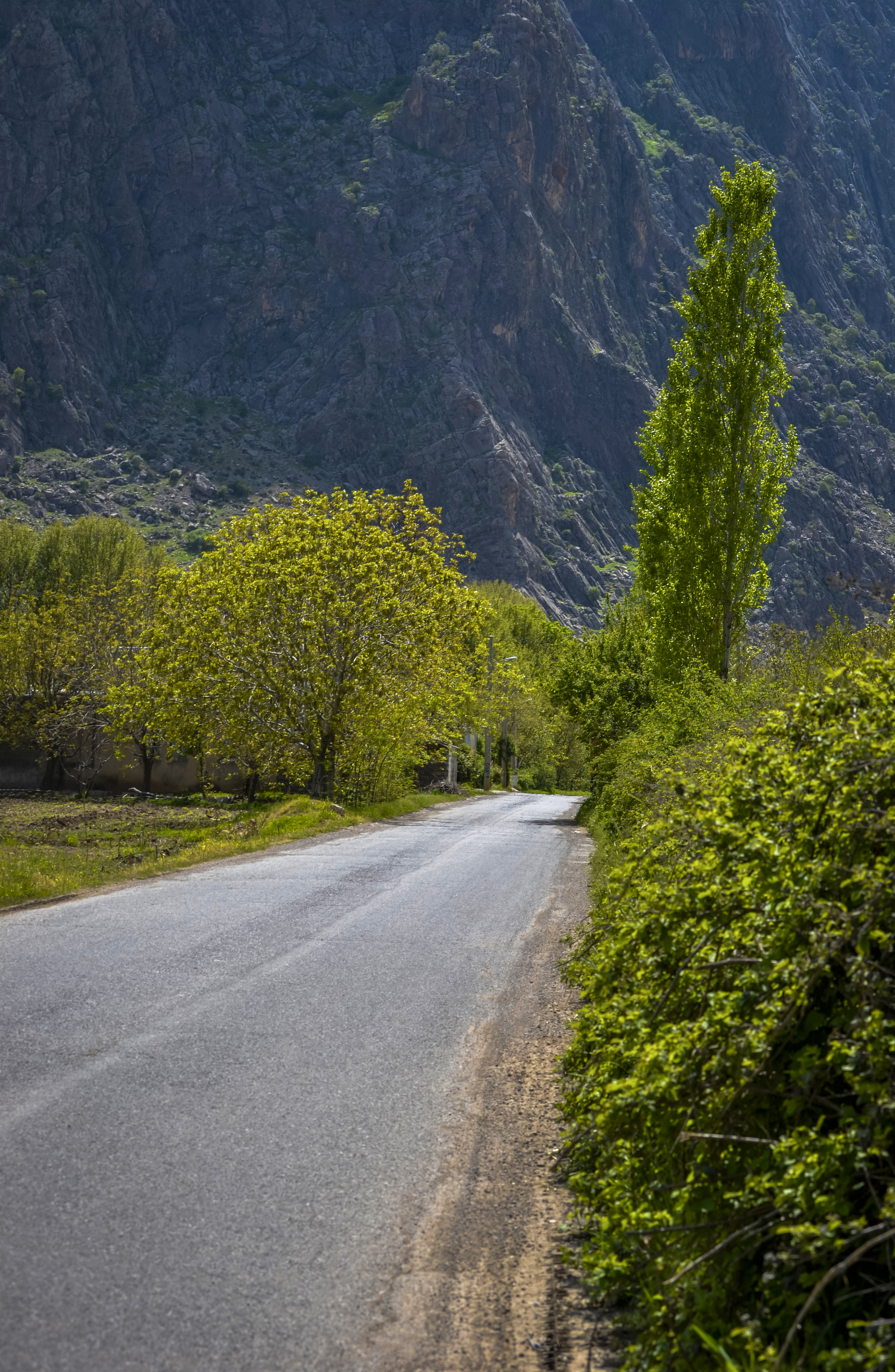
Nature of Nojubaran
