= Chambatan-e Sofla =

Chambatan-e Sofla چم بطان سفلي
- Village
- Location within Iran
- Coordinates: 34°22′43″N 47°26′59″E
- Country: Iran
- Province: Kermanshah
- County: Harsin
- Bakhsh: Bisotun
- Rural District: Cham Chamal

Population (2006)
  - Total: 439
- Time zone: UTC+3:30 (IRST)
  - Summer (DST): UTC+4:30 (IRDT)

Chambatan-e Sofla (Persian: چم بطان سفلي, also Romanized as Chambaţān-e Soflá; also known as Chambaţān-e Pā'īn) is a village in Cham Chamal Rural District, Bisotun District, Harsin County, Kermanshah Province, Iran. At the 2006 census, its population was 439, in 95 families.
