= Cheshmeh Sohrab =

Cheshmeh Sohrab چشمه سهراب کیەنی زووراو Kîyenî Zûraw
- Village
- Location within Iran
- Coordinates: 34°32′19″N 47°22′34″E
- Country: Iran
- Province: Kermanshah
- County: Harsin
- Bakhsh: Bisotun
- Rural District: Cham Chamal

Population (2006)
  - Total: 269
- Time zone: UTC+3:30 (IRST)
  - Summer (DST): UTC+4:30 (IRDT)

Cheshmeh Sohrab or Kîyenî Zûraw (Southern Kurdish: کیەنی زووراو Kîyenî Zûraw, Persian: چشمه سهراب, also Romanized as Cheshmeh Sohrāb) is a village in Cham Chamal Rural District, Bisotun District, Harsin County, Kermanshah Province, Iran. At the 2006 census, its population was 269, in 59 families.
