= Pa Tappeh =

Pa Tappeh پاتپه
- Village
- Location within Iran
- Coordinates: 34°26′55″N 47°26′57″E
- Country: Iran
- Province: Kermanshah
- County: Harsin
- Bakhsh: Bisotun
- Rural District: Cham Chamal

Population (2006)
  - Total: 381
- Time zone: UTC+3:30 (IRST)
  - Summer (DST): UTC+4:30 (IRDT)

Pa Tappeh (Persian: پاتپه, also Romanized as Pā Tappeh) is a village in Cham Chamal Rural District, Bisotun District, Harsin County, Kermanshah Province, Iran. At the 2006 census, its population was 381, in 88 families.
