= Kashantu =

Kashantu كاشانتو
- Village
- Location within Iran
- Coordinates: 34°27′19″N 47°26′46″E
- Country: Iran
- Province: Kermanshah
- County: Harsin
- Bakhsh: Bisotun
- Rural District: Cham Chamal

Population (2006)
  - Total: 449
- Time zone: UTC+3:30 (IRST)
  - Summer (DST): UTC+4:30 (IRDT)

Kashantu (Persian: كاشانتو, also Romanized as Kāshāntū) is a village in Cham Chamal Rural District, Bisotun District, Harsin County, Kermanshah Province, Iran. At the 2006 census, its population was 449, in 109 families.
