= Cheshmeh-ye Beygi =

Cheshmeh-ye Beygi چشمه بيگي
- Village
- Location within Iran
- Coordinates: 34°16′59″N 47°24′50″E
- Country: Iran
- Province: Kermanshah
- County: Harsin
- Bakhsh: Bisotun
- Rural District: Shirez

Population (2006)
  - Total: 195
- Time zone: UTC+3:30 (IRST)
  - Summer (DST): UTC+4:30 (IRDT)

Cheshmeh-ye Beygi (Persian: چشمه بيگي, also Romanized as Cheshmeh-ye Beygī) is a village in Shirez Rural District, Bisotun District, Harsin County, Kermanshah Province, Iran. At the 2006 census, its population was 195, in 41 families.
