= Herilabad =

Herilabad هريل اباد
- Village
- Location within Iran
- Coordinates: 34°25′50″N 47°29′38″E
- Country: Iran
- Province: Kermanshah
- County: Harsin
- Bakhsh: Bisotun
- Rural District: Cham Chamal

Population (2006)
  - Total: 341
- Time zone: UTC+3:30 (IRST)
  - Summer (DST): UTC+4:30 (IRDT)

Herilabad (Persian: هريل اباد, also Romanized as Herīlābād) is a village in Cham Chamal Rural District, Bisotun District, Harsin County, Kermanshah Province, Iran. At the 2006 census, its population was 341, in 80 families.
