= Chambatan-e Olya =

Chambatan-e Olya چم بطان عليا
- Village
- Location within Iran
- Coordinates: 34°23′39″N 47°27′44″E
- Country: Iran
- Province: Kermanshah
- County: Harsin
- Bakhsh: Bisotun
- Rural District: Cham Chamal

Population (2006)
  - Total: 483
- Time zone: UTC+3:30 (IRST)
  - Summer (DST): UTC+4:30 (IRDT)

Chambatan-e Olya (Persian: چم بطان عليا, also Romanized as Chambaţān-e 'Olyā; also known as Chambaţān-e Bālā) is a village in Cham Chamal Rural District, Bisotun District, Harsin County, Kermanshah province, Iran. At the 2006 census, its population was 483, in 117 families.
