= Gowhareh =

Gowhareh گوهره
- Village
- Location within Iran
- Coordinates: 34°20′40″N 47°27′21″E
- Country: Iran
- Province: Kermanshah
- County: Harsin
- Bakhsh: Bisotun
- Rural District: Cham Chamal

Population (2006)
  - Total: 276
- Time zone: UTC+3:30 (IRST)
  - Summer (DST): UTC+4:30 (IRDT)

Gowhareh (Persian: گوهره) is a village in Cham Chamal Rural District, Bisotun District, Harsin County, Kermanshah Province, Iran. At the 2006 census, its population was 276, in 60 families.
