= Komeyjeh =

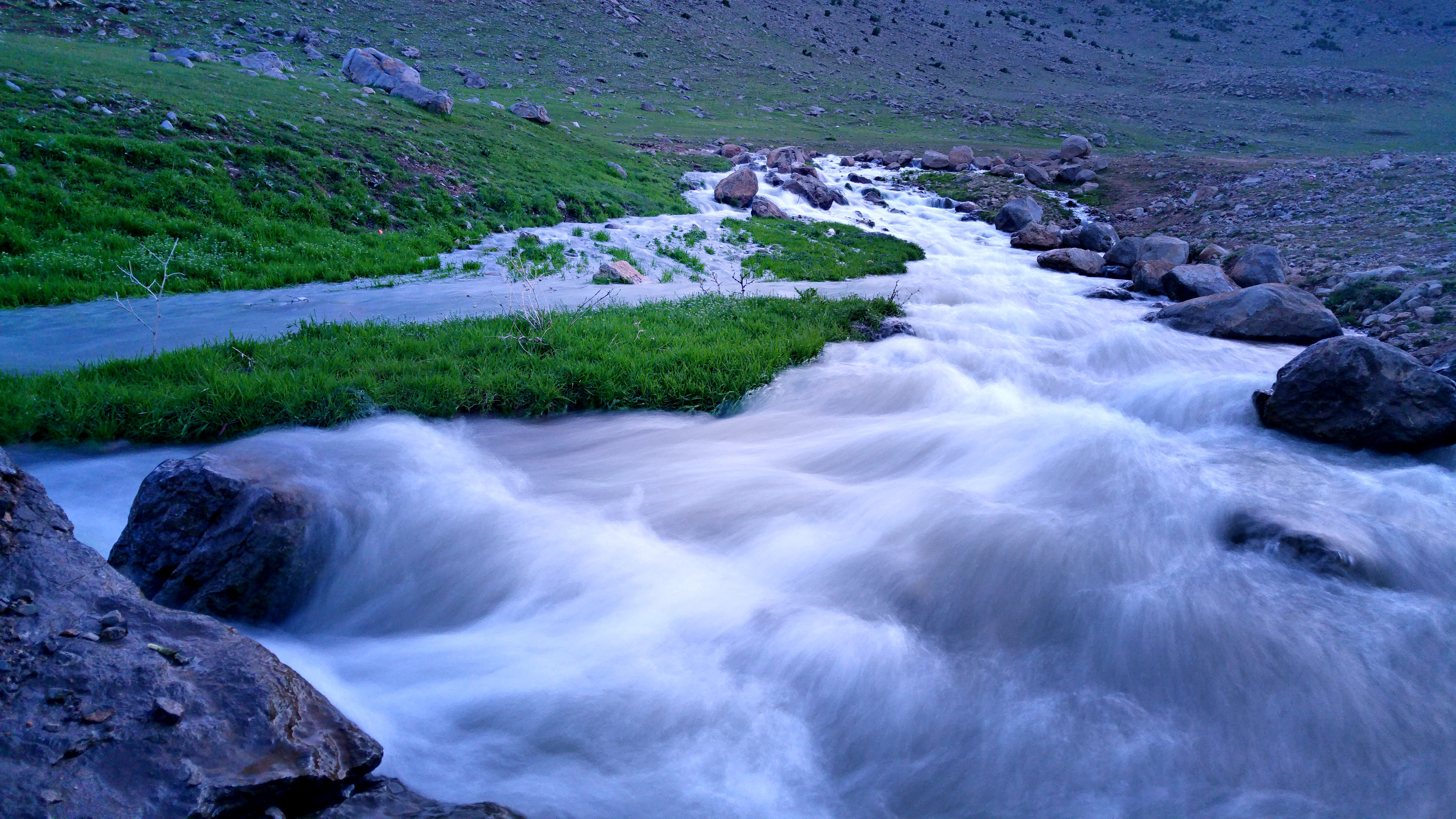
Komeyjeh كميجه
- Village
- Location within Iran
- Coordinates: 34°31′04″N 47°22′03″E
- Country: Iran
- Province: Kermanshah
- County: Harsin
- Bakhsh: Bisotun
- Rural District: Cham Chamal

Population (2006)
  - Total: 107
- Time zone: UTC+3:30 (IRST)
  - Summer (DST): UTC+4:30 (IRDT)

Komeyjeh (Persian: كميجه) is a village in Cham Chamal Rural District, Bisotun District, Harsin County, Kermanshah Province, Iran. At the 2006 census, its population was 107, in 23 families.
