= Shahrak-e Alzahra =

Shahrak-e Alzahra شهرك الزهرا
- Village
- Location within Iran
- Coordinates: 34°22′42″N 47°25′51″E
- Country: Iran
- Province: Kermanshah
- County: Harsin
- Bakhsh: Bisotun
- Rural District: Cham Chamal

Population (2006)
  - Total: 1,549
- Time zone: UTC+3:30 (IRST)
  - Summer (DST): UTC+4:30 (IRDT)

Shahrak-e Alzahra (Persian: شهرك الزهرا, also Romanized as Shahrak-e Alzahrā and Shahrak az Zahrā) is a village in Cham Chamal Rural District, Bisotun District, Harsin County, Kermanshah Province, Iran. At the 2006 census, its population was 1,549, in 345 families.
