= Marantu =

Marantu مارانتو
- Village
- Location within Iran
- Coordinates: 34°29′25″N 47°26′11″E
- Country: Iran
- Province: Kermanshah
- County: Harsin
- Bakhsh: Bisotun
- Rural District: Cham Chamal

Population (2006)
  - Total: 49
- Time zone: UTC+3:30 (IRST)
  - Summer (DST): UTC+4:30 (IRDT)

Marantu (Persian: مارانتو, also Romanized as Mārāntū) is a village in Cham Chamal Rural District, Bisotun District, Harsin County, Kermanshah Province, Iran. In a 2006 census, its population was reported to be 49.
