= Azan Vazan =

Azan Vazan ازان وازان
- Village
- Location within Iran
- Coordinates: 34°30′33″N 47°24′03″E
- Country: Iran
- Province: Kermanshah
- County: Harsin
- Bakhsh: Bisotun
- Rural District: Cham Chamal

Population (2006)
  - Total: 260
- Time zone: UTC+3:30 (IRST)
  - Summer (DST): UTC+4:30 (IRDT)

Azan Vazan (Persian: ازان وازان, also Romanized as Āzān Vāzān; also known as Āzān Owzān) is a village in Cham Chamal Rural District, Bisotun District, Harsin County, Kermanshah Province, Iran. At the 2006 census, its population was 260, in 57 families.
