= Gorgavand =

Gorgavand گرگوند
- Village
- Location within Iran
- Coordinates: 34°25′49″N 47°30′59″E
- Country: Iran
- Province: Kermanshah
- County: Harsin
- Bakhsh: Bisotun
- Rural District: Cham Chamal

Population (2006)
  - Total: 338
- Time zone: UTC+3:30 (IRST)
  - Summer (DST): UTC+4:30 (IRDT)

Gorgavand (Persian: گرگوند; also known as Gorgīvand) is a village in Cham Chamal Rural District, Bisotun District, Harsin County, Kermanshah Province, Iran. At the 2006 census, its population was 338, in 77 families.
