= Quzivand =

Quzivand قوزيوند
- Village
- Location within Iran
- Coordinates: 34°24′29″N 47°28′03″E
- Country: Iran
- Province: Kermanshah
- County: Harsin
- Bakhsh: Bisotun
- Rural District: Cham Chamal

Population (2006)
  - Total: 331
- Time zone: UTC+3:30 (IRST)
  - Summer (DST): UTC+4:30 (IRDT)

Quzivand (Persian: قوزيوند, also Romanized as Qūzīvand; also known as Qozīvand) is a village in Cham Chamal Rural District, Bisotun District, Harsin County, Kermanshah Province, Iran. At the 2006 census, its population was 331, in 72 families.
