= Sagaz-e Mobarakabad =

Sagaz-e Mobarakabad سگازمبارك اباد
- Village
- Location within Iran
- Coordinates: 34°25′18″N 47°29′00″E
- Country: Iran
- Province: Kermanshah
- County: Harsin
- Bakhsh: Bisotun
- Rural District: Cham Chamal

Population (2006)
  - Total: 470
- Time zone: UTC+3:30 (IRST)
  - Summer (DST): UTC+4:30 (IRDT)

Sagaz-e Mobarakabad (Persian: سگازمبارك اباد, also Romanized as Sagāz-e Mobārakābād; also known as Sagāz, Sagoz, and Sagūz) is a village in Cham Chamal Rural District, Bisotun District, Harsin County, Kermanshah Province, Iran by the way. At the 2006 census, its population was 470, in 106 families.
