= Garmianak =

Garmianak گرميانك
- Village
- Location within Iran
- Coordinates: 34°16′42″N 47°25′50″E
- Country: Iran
- Province: Kermanshah
- County: Harsin
- Bakhsh: Bisotun
- Rural District: Shirez

Population (2006)
  - Total: 287
- Time zone: UTC+3:30 (IRST)
  - Summer (DST): UTC+4:30 (IRDT)

Garmianak (Persian: گرميانك, also Romanized as Garmīānak and Garmeyānak; also known as Garmīāneh, Qal‘a Garmianeh, and Qal‘eh Garmiānek) is a village in Shirez Rural District, Bisotun District, Harsin County, Kermanshah Province, Iran. At the 2006 census, its population was 287, in 69 families.
