= Zolmabad =

Zolmabad or Zalmabad (Persian: ظلم اباد) may refer to:

- Zolmabad-e Olya, Kermanshah Province
- Zolmabad-e Sofla, Kermanshah Province
- Zolmabad, Khuzestan
- Zolmabad, Khoshab, Razavi Khorasan Province
- Zolmabad, Tehran
- Zolmabad-e Olya, Kermanshah Province
- Zolmabad-e Sofla, Kermanshah Province
