= Zardab-e Mohebb =

Zardab-e Mohebb زرداب محب
- Village
- Location within Iran
- Coordinates: 34°25′38″N 47°28′57″E
- Country: Iran
- Province: Kermanshah
- County: Harsin
- Bakhsh: Bisotun
- Rural District: Cham Chamal

Population (2006)
  - Total: 281
- Time zone: UTC+3:30 (IRST)
  - Summer (DST): UTC+4:30 (IRDT)

Zardab-e Mohebb (Persian: زرداب محب, also Romanized as Zardāb-e Moḩebb and Zardāb-e Moḩeb; also known as Zardāb) is a village in Cham Chamal Rural District, Bisotun District, Harsin County, Kermanshah Province, Iran. At the 2006 census, its population was 281, in 59 families.
