= Sarmaj-e Hoseynkhani =

Sarmaj-e Hoseynkhani سرماج حسين خاني
- Village
- Location within Iran
- Coordinates: 34°21′28″N 47°31′15″E
- Country: Iran
- Province: Kermanshah
- County: Harsin
- Bakhsh: Bisotun
- Rural District: Shirez

Population (2006)
  - Total: 1,289
- Time zone: UTC+3:30 (IRST)
  - Summer (DST): UTC+4:30 (IRDT)

Sarmaj-e Hoseynkhani (Persian: سرماج حسين خاني, also Romanized as Sarmāj-e Ḩoseynkhānī; also known as Sarmāj) is a village in Shirez Rural District, Bisotun District, Harsin County, Kermanshah Province, Iran. At the 2006 census, its population was 1,289, in 310 families.
