= Beznabad-e Olya =

Beznabad-e Olya بزن ابادعليا
- Village
- Location within Iran
- Coordinates: 34°21′50″N 47°28′23″E
- Country: Iran
- Province: Kermanshah
- County: Harsin
- Bakhsh: Bisotun
- Rural District: Cham Chamal

Population (2006)
  - Total: 71
- Time zone: UTC+3:30 (IRST)
  - Summer (DST): UTC+4:30 (IRDT)

Beznabad-e Olya (Persian: بزن ابادعليا, also Romanized as Beznābād-e ‘Olyā; also known as Beznābād-e Bālā) is a village in Cham Chamal Rural District, Bisotun District, Harsin County, Kermanshah Province, Iran. At the 2006 census, its population was 71, in 12 families.
