= Zolmabad-e Sofla =

Zolmabad-e Sofla ظلم ابادسفلي
- Village
- Location within Iran
- Coordinates: 34°27′38″N 47°25′12″E
- Country: Iran
- Province: Kermanshah
- County: Harsin
- Bakhsh: Bisotun
- Rural District: Cham Chamal

Population (2006)
  - Total: 215
- Time zone: UTC+3:30 (IRST)
  - Summer (DST): UTC+4:30 (IRDT)

Zolmabad-e Sofla (Persian: ظلم ابادسفلي, also Romanized as Z̧olmābād-e Soflá; also known as Z̧olmābād-e Pā'īn) is a village in Cham Chamal Rural District, Bisotun District, Harsin County, Kermanshah Province, Iran. At the 2006 census, its population was 215, in 46 families.
