= Qeshlaq-e Daryacheh =

Qeshlaq-e Daryacheh قشلاق درياچه
- Village
- Location within Iran
- Coordinates: 34°28′22″N 47°23′50″E
- Country: Iran
- Province: Kermanshah
- County: Harsin
- Bakhsh: Bisotun
- Rural District: Cham Chamal

Population (2006)
  - Total: 115
- Time zone: UTC+3:30 (IRST)
  - Summer (DST): UTC+4:30 (IRDT)

Qeshlaq-e Daryacheh (Persian: قشلاق درياچه, also Romanized as Qeshlāq-e Daryācheh; also known as Daryācheh) is a village in Cham Chamal Rural District, Bisotun District, Harsin County, Kermanshah Province, Iran. At the 2006 census, its population was 115, in 23 families.
