= Jalilvand, Harsin =

Jalilvand جليلوند
- Village
- Location within Iran
- Coordinates: 34°28′37″N 47°21′52″E
- Country: Iran
- Province: Kermanshah
- County: Harsin
- Bakhsh: Bisotun
- Rural District: Cham Chamal

Population (2006)
  - Total: 91
- Time zone: UTC+3:30 (IRST)
  - Summer (DST): UTC+4:30 (IRDT)

Jalilvand (Persian: جليلوند, also Romanized as Jalīlvand; also known as Ḩalīlvand) is a village in Cham Chamal Rural District, Bisotun District, Harsin County, Kermanshah Province, Iran. At the 2006 census, its population was 91, in 15 families.
