= Chehr =

Village in Kermanshah province, Iran

Chehr Persian: چهر
- Village
- Location within Iran
- Coordinates: 34°19′18″N 47°26′05″E
- Country: Iran
- Province: Kermanshah
- County: Harsin
- District: Bisotun
- Rural District: Shirez

Population (2016)
  - Total: 2,277
- Time zone: UTC+3:30 (IRST)

Chehr (Persian: چهر) is a village in, and the capital of, Shirez Rural District of Bisotun District, Harsin County, Kermanshah province, Iran.

== Demographics ==
=== Population ===
At the time of the 2006 National Census, the village's population was 2,129 in 501 households. The following census in 2011 counted 2,053 people in 561 households. The 2016 census measured the population of the village as 2,277 people in 664 households. It was the most populous village in its rural district.
