= Shadabad-e Sofla =

Shadabad-e Sofla شادابادسفلي
- Village
- Location within Iran
- Coordinates: 34°22′50″N 47°33′50″E
- Country: Iran
- Province: Kermanshah
- County: Harsin
- Bakhsh: Bisotun
- Rural District: Shirez

Population (2006)
  - Total: 321
- Time zone: UTC+3:30 (IRST)
  - Summer (DST): UTC+4:30 (IRDT)

Shadabad-e Sofla (Persian: شادابادسفلي, also Romanized as Shādābād-e Soflá) is a village in Shirez Rural District, Bisotun District, Harsin County, Kermanshah Province, Iran. At the 2006 census, its population was 321, in 80 families.
