= Sarmaj-e Karami =

Sarmaj-e Karami سرماج كرمي
- Village
- Location within Iran
- Coordinates: 34°21′44″N 47°33′06″E
- Country: Iran
- Province: Kermanshah
- County: Harsin
- Bakhsh: Bisotun
- Rural District: Shirez

Population (2006)
  - Total: 56
- Time zone: UTC+3:30 (IRST)
  - Summer (DST): UTC+4:30 (IRDT)

Sarmaj-e Karami (Persian: سرماج كرمي, also Romanized as Sarmāj-e Karamī; also known as Sarmāj and Sarmāj-e Keranū) is a village in Shirez Rural District, Bisotun District, Harsin County, Kermanshah Province, Iran. At the 2006 census, its population was 56, in 10 families.
