= Shadabad =

Shadabad (Persian: شاداباد) may refer to:

- Shadabad-e Mashayekh, East Azerbaijan Province
- Shadabad-e Olya, Kermanshah Province
- Shadabad-e Olya, East Azerbaijan
- Shadabad-e Sofla, Kermanshah Province
- Shadabad, Tehran
