= Belverdi =

Belverdi (Persian: بلوردي) may refer to:

- Belverdi-ye Jadid
- Belverdi-ye Qadim
