= Sarmaj =

Sarmaj (Persian: سرماج) may refer to:

- Sarmaj-e Hoseynkhani
- Sarmaj-e Karami
