= Belverdi-ye Qadim =

Belverdi-ye Qadim بلوردي قديم
- Village
- Location within Iran
- Coordinates: 34°20′49″N 47°24′35″E
- Country: Iran
- Province: Kermanshah
- County: Harsin
- Bakhsh: Bisotun
- Rural District: Cham Chamal

Population (2006)
  - Total: 40
- Time zone: UTC+3:30 (IRST)
  - Summer (DST): UTC+4:30 (IRDT)

Belverdi-ye Qadim (Persian: بلوردي قديم, also Romanized as Belverdī-ye Qadīm; also known as Belverdī-ye Pā'īn and Belverdī-ye Soflá) is a village in Cham Chamal Rural District, Bisotun District, Harsin County, Kermanshah Province, Iran. At the 2006 census, its population was 40, in 10 families.
