= Daryacheh =

Daryacheh (Persian: درياچه, meaning "lake") may refer to:

- Daryacheh, Kerman
- Daryacheh, Kermanshah
- Daryacheh, Razavi Khorasan
