= Sirduleh, Harsin =

Sirduleh سيردوله
- Village
- Location within Iran
- Coordinates: 34°22′29″N 47°35′56″E
- Country: Iran
- Province: Kermanshah
- County: Harsin
- Bakhsh: Bisotun
- Rural District: Shirez

Population (2006)
  - Total: 109
- Time zone: UTC+3:30 (IRST)
  - Summer (DST): UTC+4:30 (IRDT)

Sirduleh (Persian: سيردوله, also Romanized as Sīrdūleh; also known as Sīrehdūleh) is a village in Shirez Rural District, Bisotun District, Harsin County, Kermanshah Province, Iran. At the 2006 census, its population was 109, in 26 families.
