= Zolmabad-e Olya =

Zolmabad-e Olya ظلم ابادعليا
- Village
- Location within Iran
- Coordinates: 34°26′47″N 47°25′02″E
- Country: Iran
- Province: Kermanshah
- County: Harsin
- Bakhsh: Bisotun
- Rural District: Cham Chamal

Population (2006)
  - Total: 176
- Time zone: UTC+3:30 (IRST)
  - Summer (DST): UTC+4:30 (IRDT)

Zolmabad-e Olya (Persian: ظلم ابادعليا, also Romanized as Z̧olmābād-e ‘Olyā; also known as Z̧olmābād-e Bālā) is a village in Cham Chamal Rural District, Bisotun District, Harsin County, Kermanshah Province, Iran. At the 2006 census, its population was 176, in 40 families.
