= Beznabad =

Beznabad (Persian: بزن اباد) may refer to:

- Beznabad-e Olya
- Beznabad-e Sofla
