= Shadabad-e Olya =

Shadabad-e Olya شادابادعليا
- Village
- Location within Iran
- Coordinates: 34°22′45″N 47°35′05″E
- Country: Iran
- Province: Kermanshah
- County: Harsin
- Bakhsh: Bisotun
- Rural District: Shirez

Population (2006)
  - Total: 289
- Time zone: UTC+3:30 (IRST)
  - Summer (DST): UTC+4:30 (IRDT)

Shadabad-e Olya (Persian: شادابادعليا, also Romanized as Shādābād-e ‘Olyā) is a village in Shirez Rural District, Bisotun District, Harsin County, Kermanshah Province, Iran. At the 2006 census, its population was 289, in 67 families.
