= Farrash, Kermanshah =

Farrash فراش
- village
- Location within Iran
- Coordinates: 34°20′42″N 47°25′32″E
- Country: Iran
- Province: Kermanshah
- County: Harsin
- Bakhsh: Bisotun
- Rural District: Cham Chamal

Population (2006)
  - Total: 515
- Time zone: UTC+3:30 (IRST)
  - Summer (DST): UTC+4:30 (IRDT)

Farrash (Persian: فراش, also Romanized as Farrâš or Farrāsh) is a village in Cham Chamal Rural District, Bisotun District, Harsin County, Kermanshah Province, Iran. As of the 2006 census, its population was 515, in 101 families.
