= Sirduleh =

Sirduleh (Persian: سيردوله) may refer to:

- Sirduleh, Harsin
- Sirduleh, Sonqor
