= Beznabad-e Sofla =

Beznabad-e Sofla بزن ابادسفلي
- Village
- Location within Iran
- Coordinates: 34°22′25″N 47°27′42″E
- Country: Iran
- Province: Kermanshah
- County: Harsin
- Bakhsh: Bisotun
- Rural District: Cham Chamal

Population (2006)
  - Total: 203
- Time zone: UTC+3:30 (IRST)
  - Summer (DST): UTC+4:30 (IRDT)

Beznabad-e Sofla (Persian: بزن ابادسفلي, also Romanized as Beznābād-e Soflá; also known as Bazīnābād-e Pā’īn and Beznābād-e Pā'īn) is a village in Cham Chamal Rural District, Bisotun District, Harsin County, Kermanshah Province, Iran. At the 2006 census, its population was 203, in 47 families.
