= Farrash =

Farrash may refer to:

- Fərraş, a village in Azerbaijan
- Farrash, Kermanshah, a village in Kermanshah Province, Iran
- Farrash, Iran, a city in Fars Province, Iran
