= Jalilvand =

Jalilvand (Persian: جليلوند) may refer to:

- Jalilvand, Eslamabad-e Gharb
- Jalilvand, Harsin
