= Allium bisotunense =

Scientific classification
- Kingdom: Plantae
- Clade: Tracheophytes
- Clade: Angiosperms
- Clade: Monocots
- Order: Asparagales
- Family: Amaryllidaceae
- Subfamily: Allioideae
- Genus: Allium
- Subgenus: Allium subg. Melanocrommyum
- Species: A. bisotunense

Binomial name
- Allium bisotunense R.M.Fritsch

Species of flowering plant

Allium bisotunense is a species of flowering plant in the family Amaryllidaceae and is endemic to Iran.

They are cultivated in the Iranian Research Institute of Plant Protection.

== Etymology ==
The name bisotunense derives from Bisotun, a city in Iran.

== Description ==
Like all species in the Melanocrommyum subgenus, this species is known to have 8 chromosomes. In addition, there is a mix of diploid and triploid individuals.

They have spherical bulbs with a diameter of about 2–3 cm. They have flat, ovate leaves that are 15–25 cm long and bowl-shaped flowers that are 5–6 cm high and 6–10 cm in diameter.
