= Sonqorabad =

Sonqorabad (also spelled Sanqorabad) (Persian: سنقراباد) may refer to several places in Iran:

- Sonqorabad, Alborz, a village in Chaharbagh County
- Sonqorabad, East Azerbaijan, a village in Mianeh County
- Sonqorabad, Hamadan, a village in Dargazin County
- Sonqorabad, Kermanshah, a village in Harsin County
- Sonqorabad, Kohgiluyeh and Boyer-Ahmad, a village in Kohgiluyeh County
- Sonqorabad, Razavi Khorasan, a village in Bakharz County
