= Zardab (disambiguation) =

Zardab or Zard Ab may refer to:

- Zardab (city), Azerbaijan
- Zardab District, in Azerbaijan
- Zardab, Kermanshah, in Iran
- Zard Ab, Mazandaran, in Iran
- Zardab, South Khorasan, in Iran
- Zard Ab, Tehran, in Iran
