= Belverdi-ye Jadid =

Village in Kermanshah province, Iran

Belverdi-ye Jadid Persian: بلوردي جديد
- Village
- Location within Iran
- Coordinates: 34°21′50″N 47°24′14″E
- Country: Iran
- Province: Kermanshah
- County: Harsin
- District: Bisotun
- Rural District: Chamchamal

Population (2016)
  - Total: 2,188
- Time zone: UTC+3:30 (IRST)

Belverdi-ye Jadid (Persian: بلوردي جديد) (Note: Also romanized as Belverdī-ye Jadīd; also known as Belverdī-ye Bālā and Belverdī-ye ‘Olyā) is a village in Chamchamal Rural District of Bisotun District, Harsin County, Kermanshah province, Iran.

== Demographics ==
=== Population ===
At the time of the 2006 National Census, the village's population was 1,880 in 460 households. The following census in 2011 counted 2,941 people in 818 households. The 2016 census measured the population of the village as 2,188 people in 638 households. It was the most populous village in its rural district.
