= Ferras (disambiguation) =

Ferras is an American singer-songwriter and musician.

Ferras may also refer to:

- Fərraş, a village in Azerbaijan
- Christian Ferras, a violinist
- Joe Ferras, a former Canadian ice hockey player
- Carlos Ferrás Sexto, a Galician geographer and academic
- Ferras (EP), the second EP by the artist Ferras
