= Jalilvand, Eslamabad-e Gharb =

Jalilvand جليلوند
- Village
- Location within Iran
- Coordinates: 34°14′22″N 46°32′34″E
- Country: Iran
- Province: Kermanshah
- County: Eslamabad-e Gharb
- Bakhsh: Central
- Rural District: Howmeh-ye Shomali

Population (2006)
  - Total: 34
- Time zone: UTC+3:30 (IRST)
  - Summer (DST): UTC+4:30 (IRDT)

Jalilvand (Persian: جليلوند, also Romanized as Jalīlvand) is a village in Howmeh-ye Shomali Rural District, in the Central District of Eslamabad-e Gharb County, Kermanshah Province, Iran The Jileh Van clan is one of the clans of the great Sanjabi tribe that migrated to this area from Poshtkuh Lorestan about four hundred and fifty years ago. There are 750 people, most of whom now live in Islamabad West. The religion of all the people of the village is Ahl-e-Haq and they belong to the Khamoushi family. The economy of most people is based on agriculture and animal husbandry based on historical monuments. Which includes the ancient site and hill and the cemetery show the historical antiquity of this region. The variety of historical monuments in the region from the cave-dwelling and Stone Age to the historical and contemporary period shows the uninterrupted and continuous life in this village. There are many families in this village. Which can be named from the families of Rezaei - Ali Yari - Shahriari - Azizi - Karami - Salehi - Nouri - Ali Moradi - Amini - Ali Mohammadi. At the 2006 census, its population was 34, in 11 families.
