= Sirduleh, Sonqor =

Sirduleh سيردوله
- Village
- Location within Iran
- Coordinates: 34°50′21″N 47°18′10″E
- Country: Iran
- Province: Kermanshah
- County: Sonqor
- Bakhsh: Kolyai
- Rural District: Satar

Population (2006)
  - Total: 147
- Time zone: UTC+3:30 (IRST)
  - Summer (DST): UTC+4:30 (IRDT)

Sirduleh (Persian: سيردوله, also Romanized as Sīrdūleh) is a village in Satar Rural District, Kolyai District, Sonqor County, Kermanshah Province, Iran. At the 2006 census, its population was 147, in 39 families.
