= Daryacheh, Kerman =

Daryacheh درياچه
- Village
- Location within Iran
- Coordinates: 28°28′49″N 57°47′23″E
- Country: Iran
- Province: Kerman
- County: Jiroft
- Bakhsh: Central
- Rural District: Eslamabad

Population (2006)
  - Total: 777
- Time zone: UTC+3:30 (IRST)
  - Summer (DST): UTC+4:30 (IRDT)

Daryacheh (Persian: درياچه, also romanized as Daryācheh) is a village in Eslamabad Rural District, in the Central District of Jiroft County, Kerman Province, Iran. At the 2006 census, its population was 777, in 163 families.
