= Bisotun =

City in Kermanshah province, Iran

Bisotun Persian: بیستون
- City
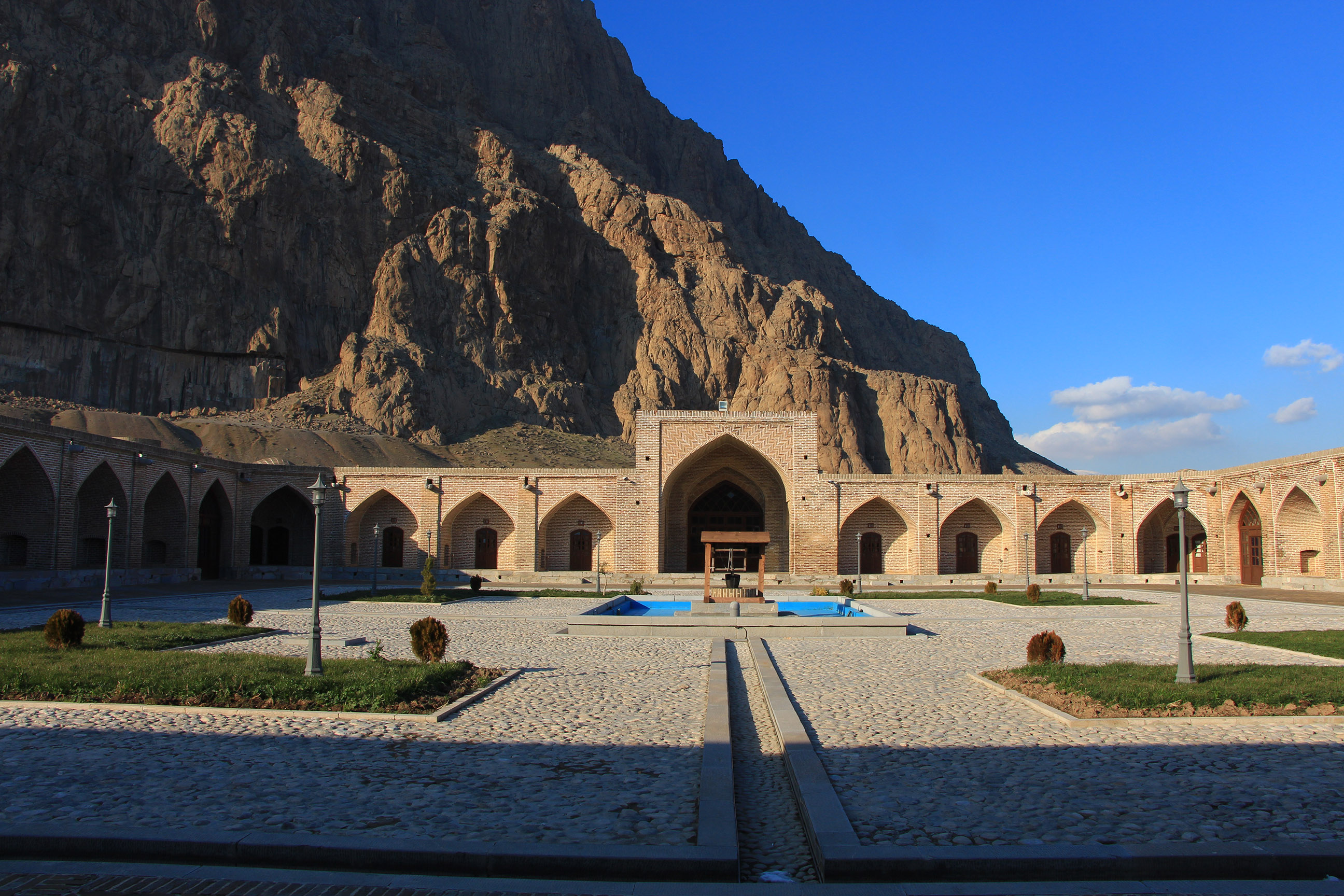
- Shah Abbasi Caravansarai, Bisotun

- Location within Iran
- Coordinates: 34°23′55″N 47°26′38″E
- Country: Iran
- Province: Kermanshah
- County: Harsin
- District: Bisotun

Population (2016)
  - Total: 4,942
- Time zone: UTC+3:30 (IRST)

Bisotun (Persian: بیستون) (Note: Also romanized as Bīsotūn; also known as Bīsītan and Bīsītūn) is a city in, and the capital of, Bisotun District of Harsin County, Kermanshah province, Iran. It also serves as the administrative center for Chamchamal Rural District.

== Demographics ==
=== Population ===
At the time of the 2006 National Census, the city's population was 2,075 in 527 households. The following census in 2011 counted 5,107 people in 1,427 households. The 2016 census measured the population of the city as 4,942 people in 1,495 households.

== Overview ==
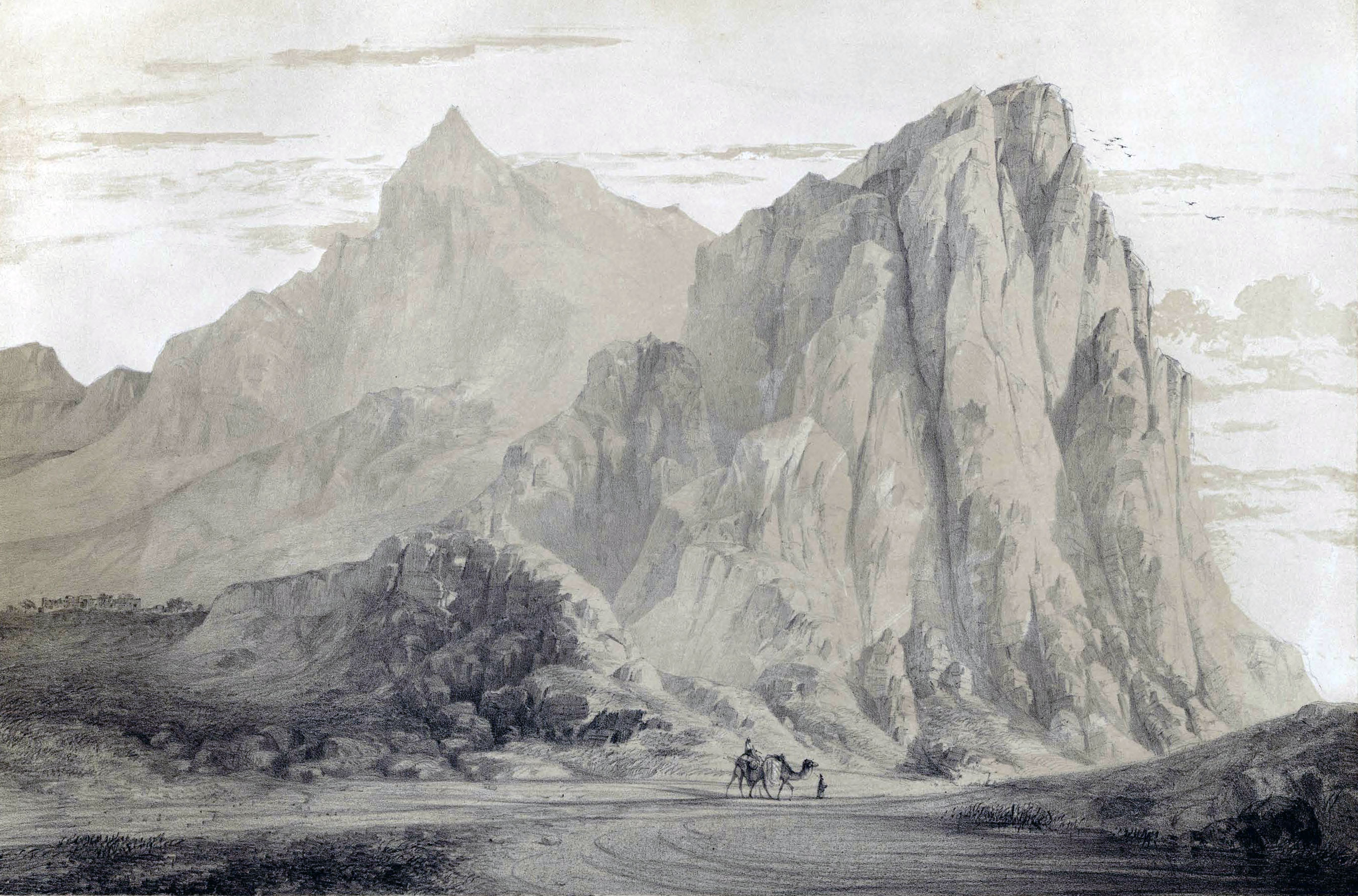
Mount Bi-Sutoun by Eugène Flandin

The town is at the foot of Bisotun Mountain, the flank of which is the location of an important historical site. The imperial road from Ekbatana to Babylon passed at the foot of the mountain. On the rocky slopes king Darius I left the Behistun Inscription. From the Seleucid epoch there is a Herakles statue. Next to it Parthian kings added some reliefs. Late Sasanian rulers prepared a large piece of rock for another victory relief which was never finished because of the subsequent Arab invasion. Later folklore connected this place to the legend of Farhad and Shirin.

A Safavid caravanserai is preserved in Bisotun.

== Gallery ==
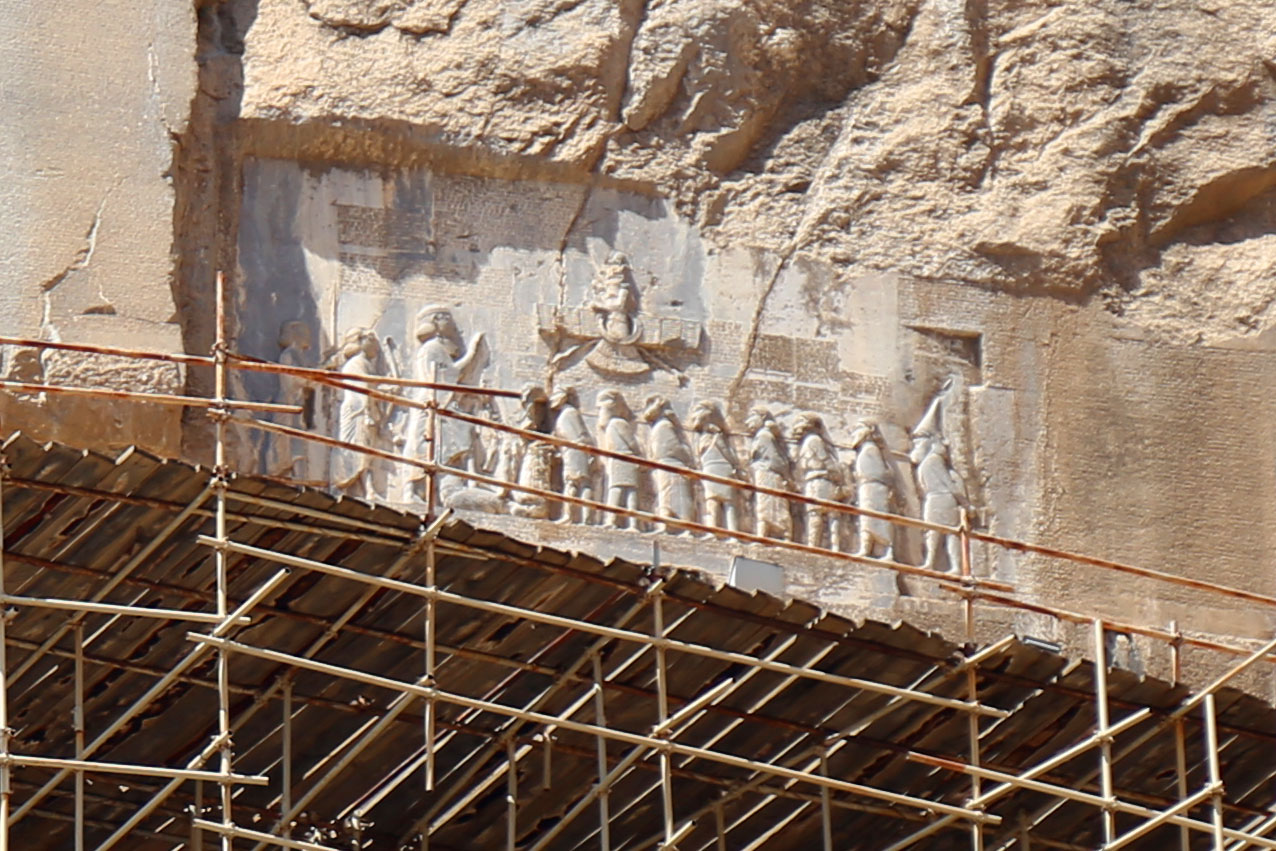
Bistoon Inscription

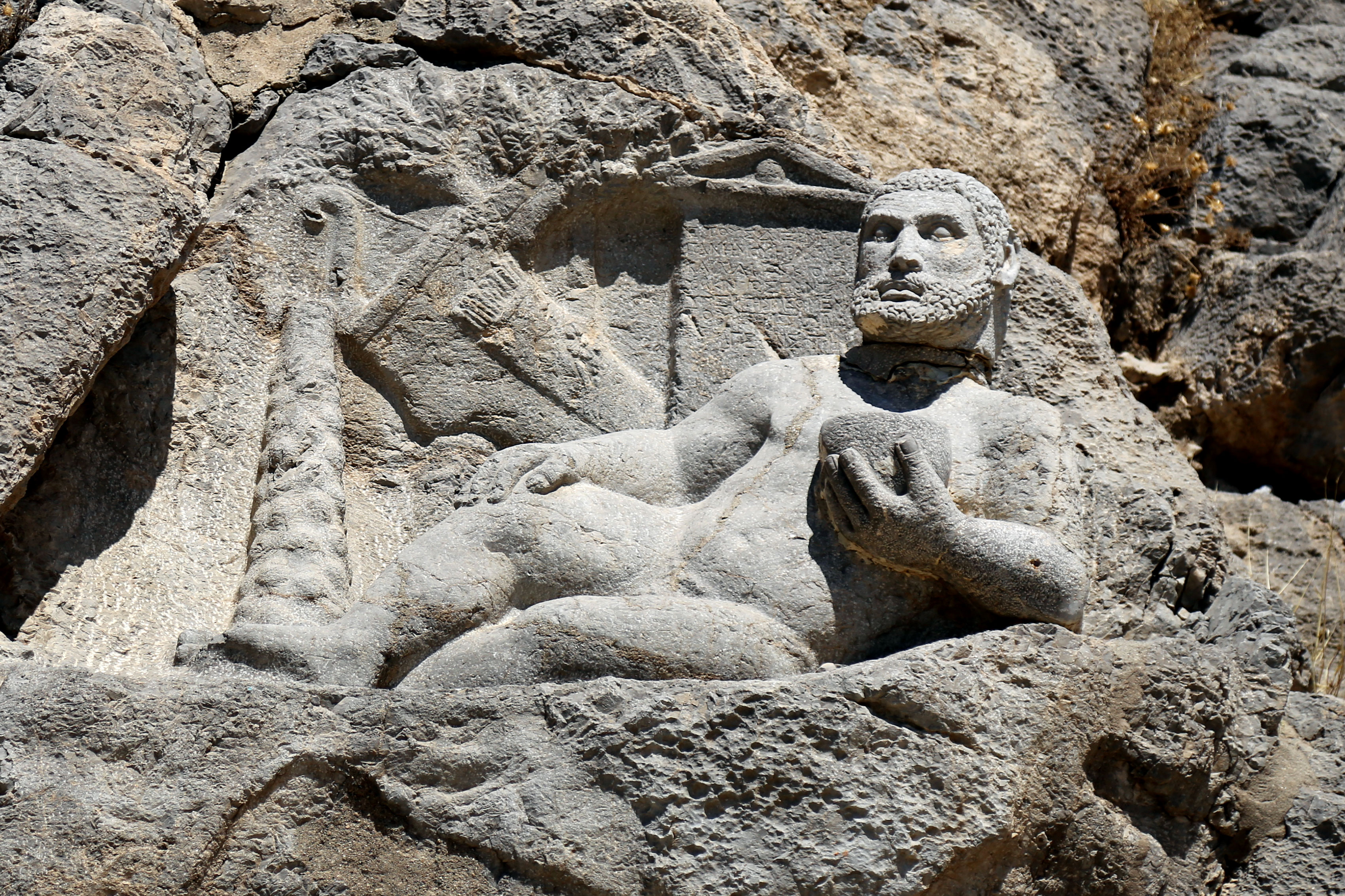
Hercules Statue, Bistoon, Kermanshah

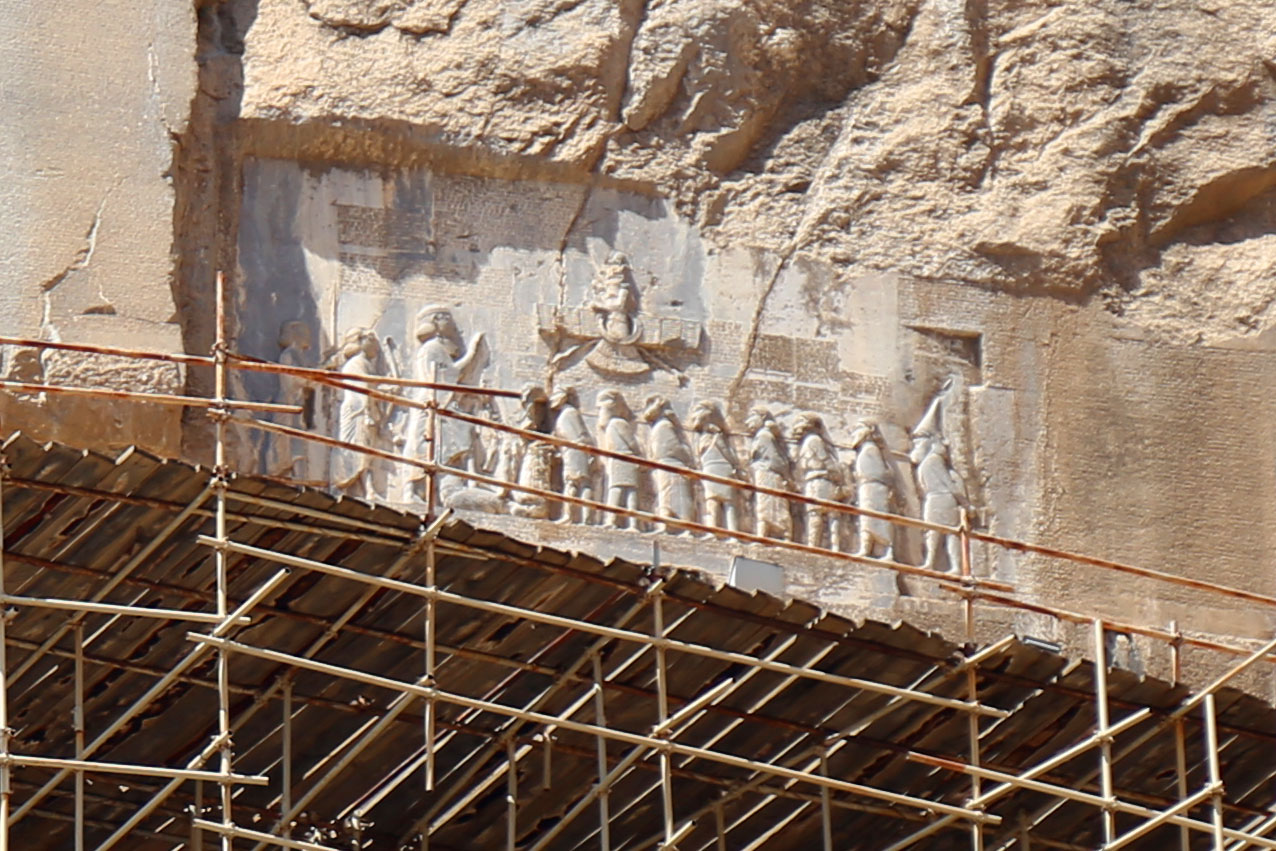
Bistoon, Kermanshah, Iran

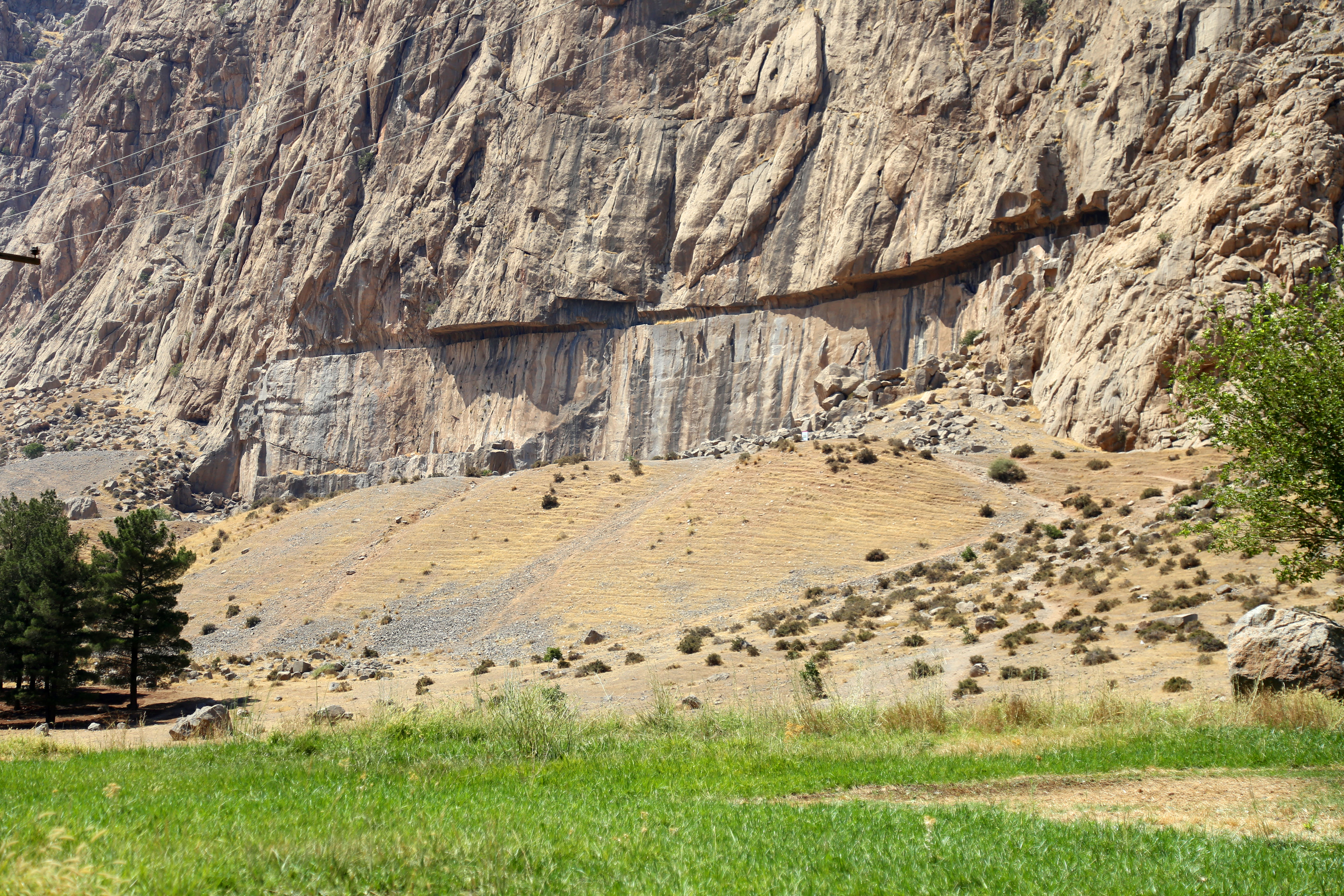
Bistoon, Kermanshah, Iran

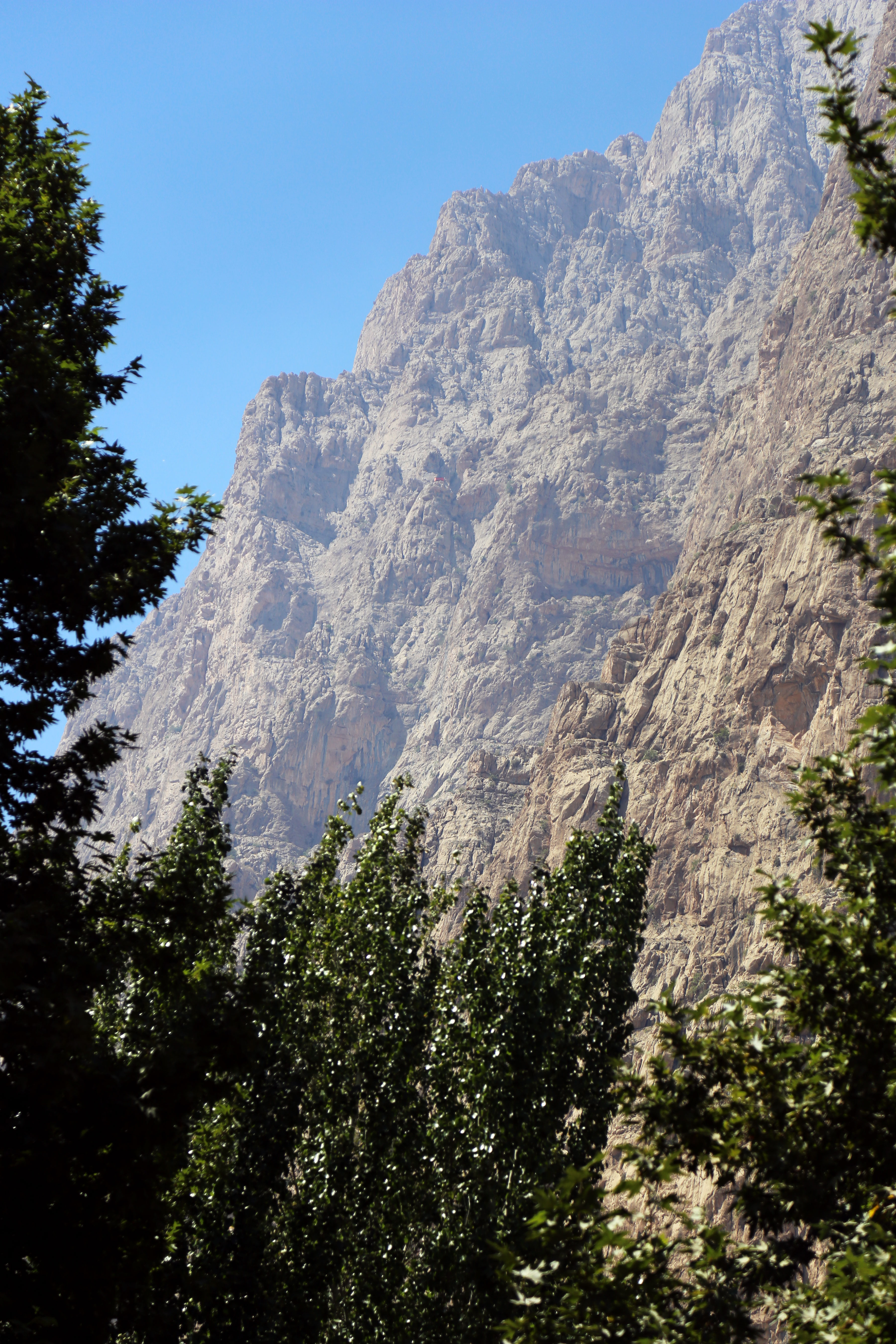
Bistoon, Kermanshah, Iran

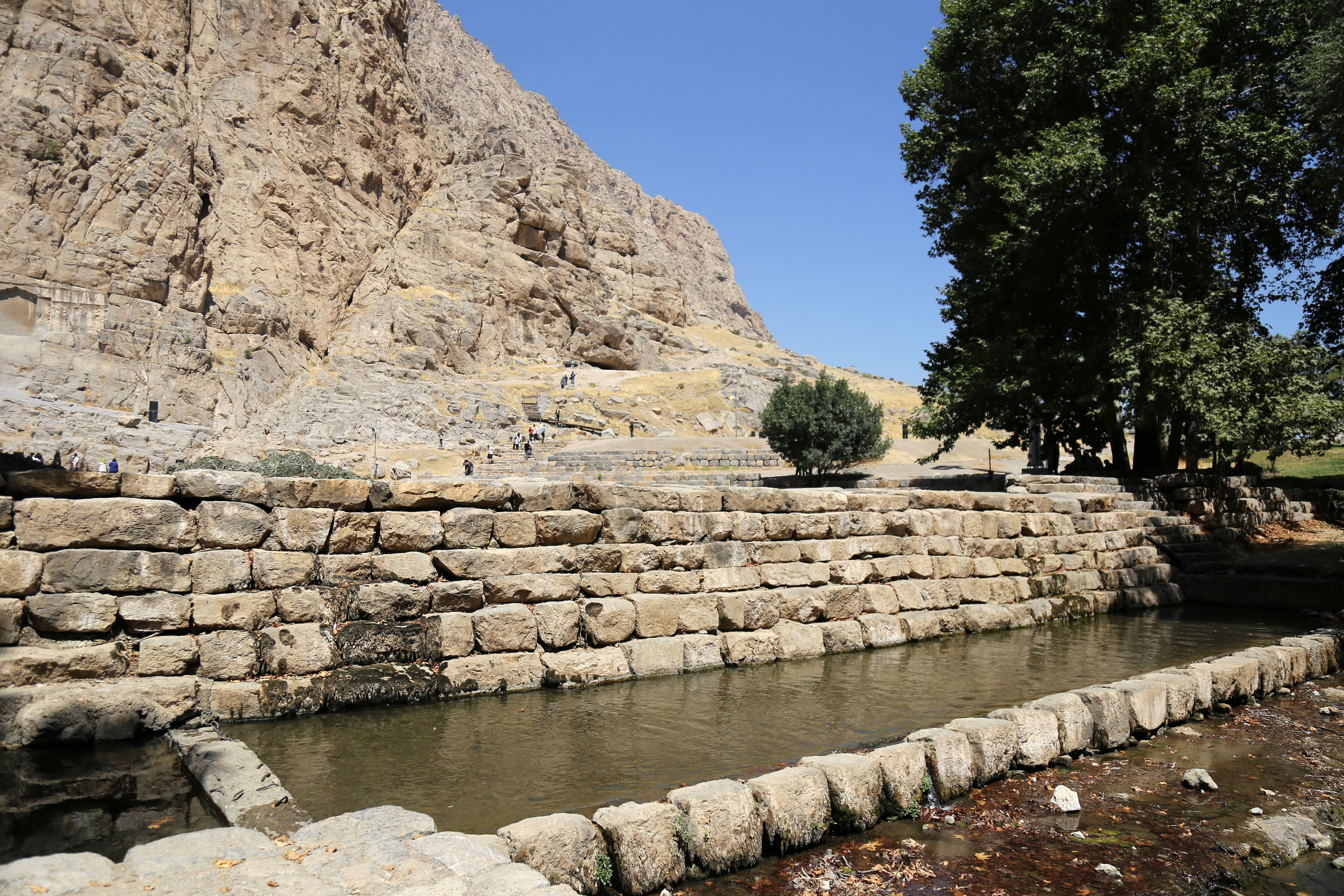
Bistoon Spring, Kermanshah, Iran

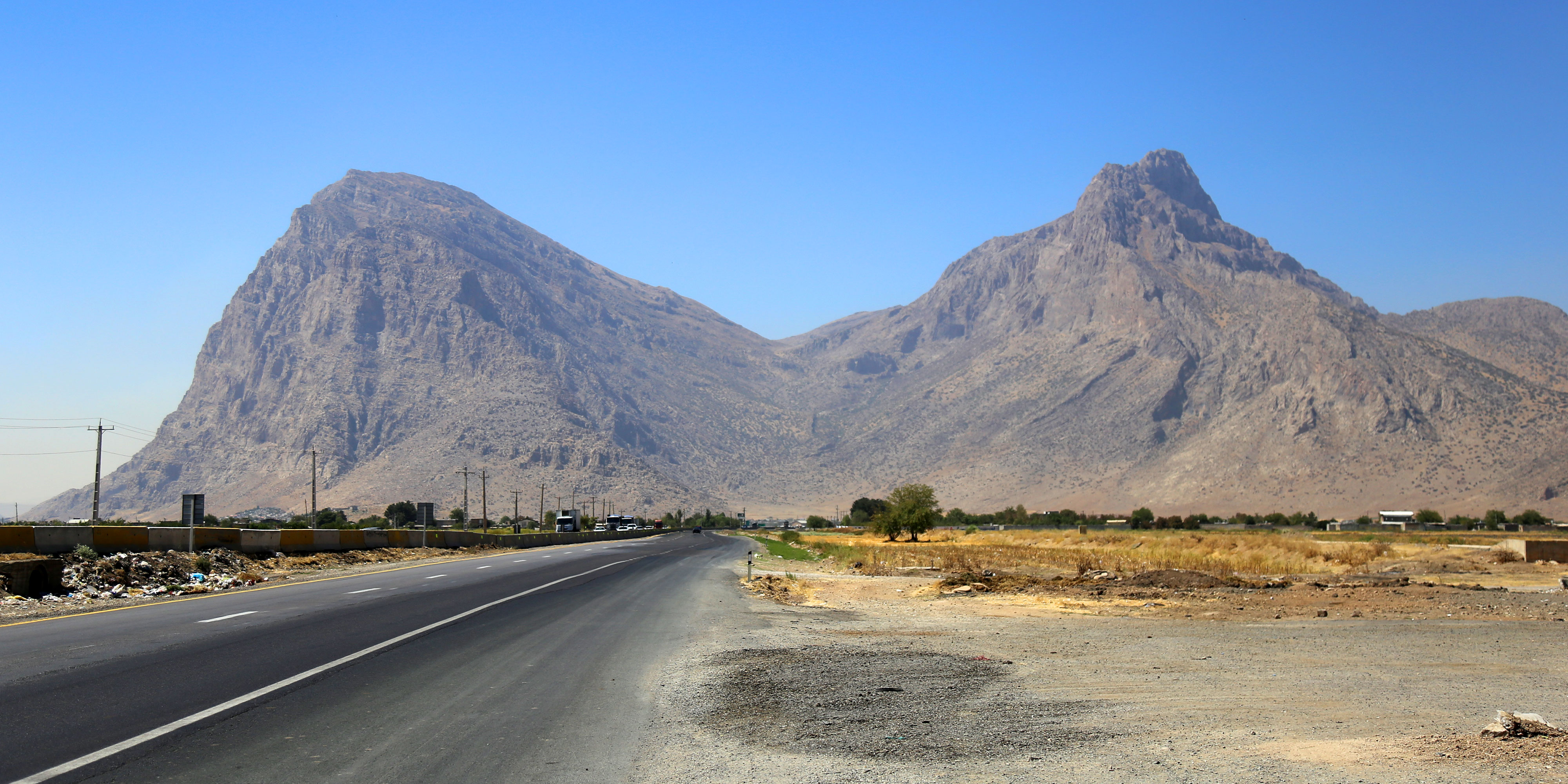
Bistoon, Kermanshah, Iran

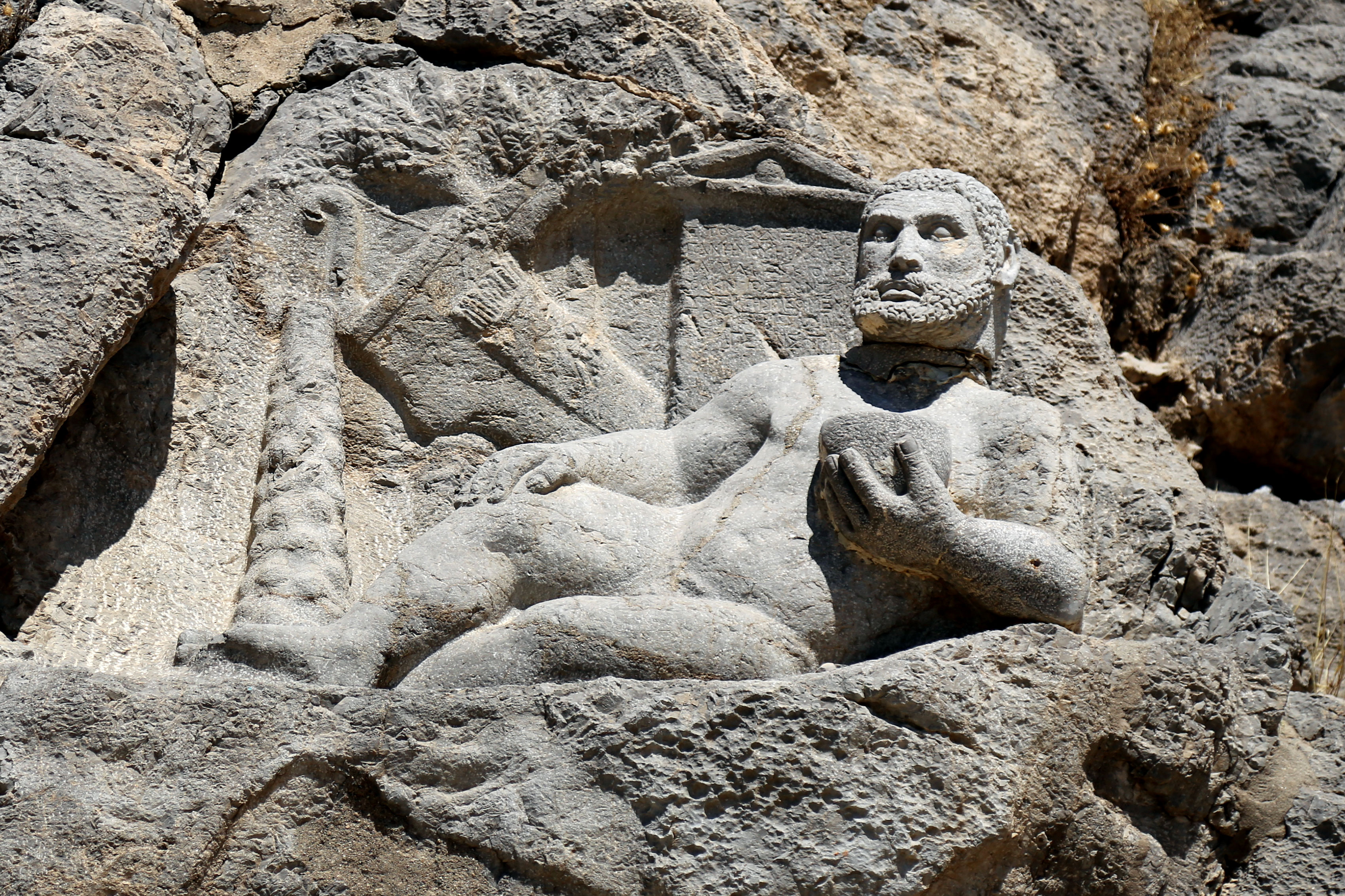
Hercules Statue, Bistoon, Kermanshah

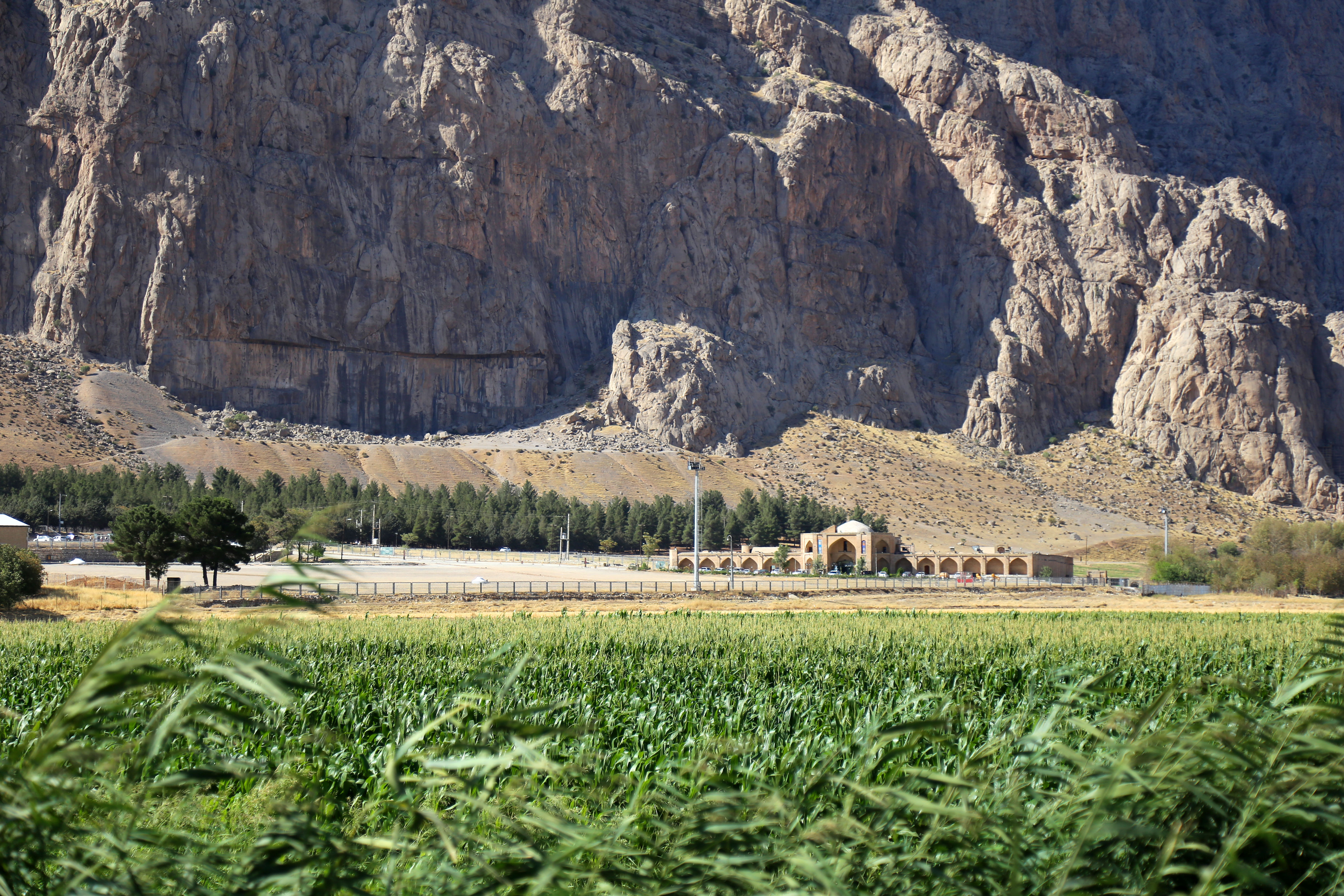
Bistoon, Kermanshah, Iran

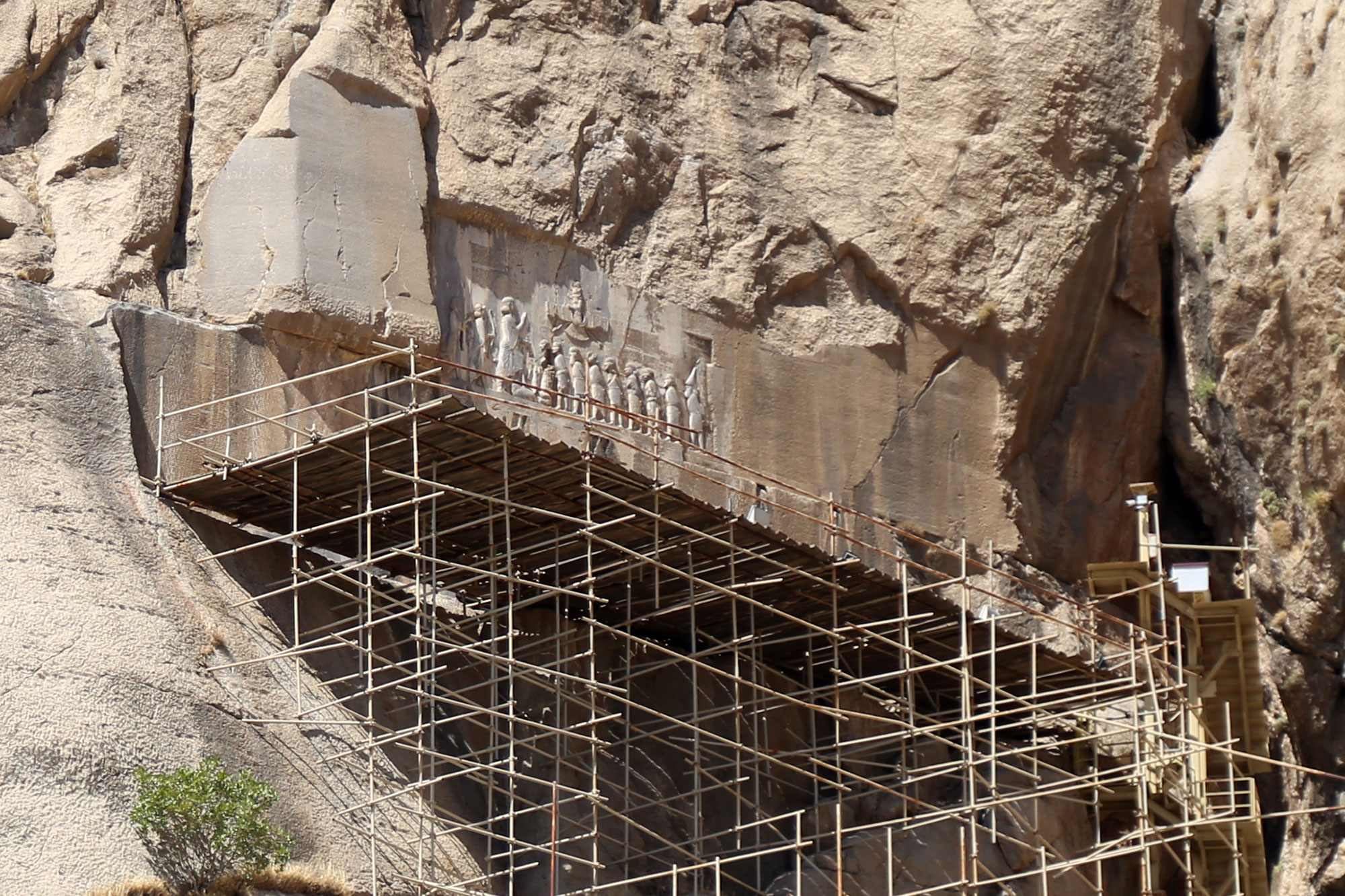
Bistoon Inscription, Kermanshah, Iran

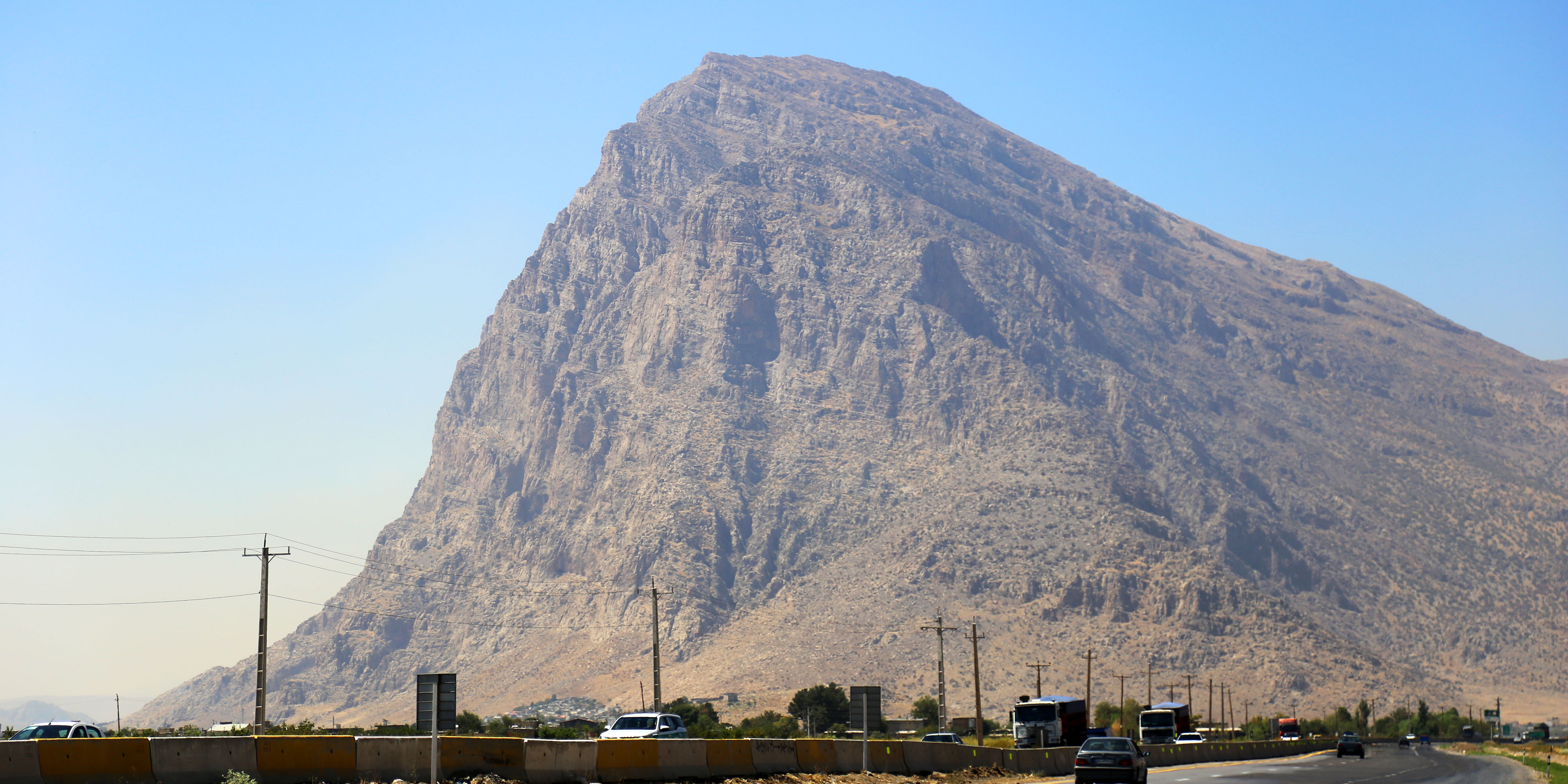
Bistoon, Kermanshah, Iran

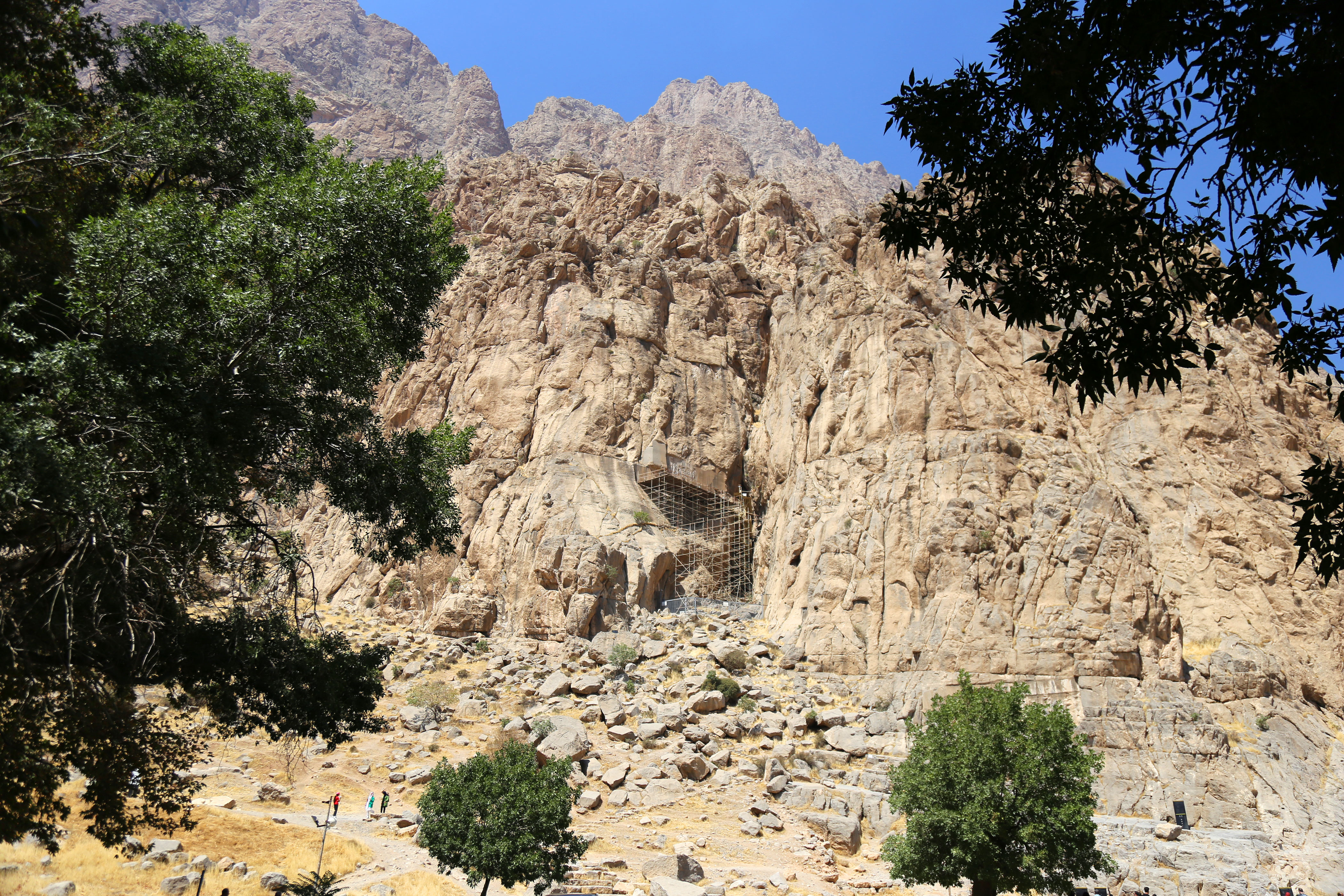
Bistoon, Kermanshah, Iran

== See also ==
Media related to Bisotun at Wikimedia Commons
