= Fərraş =

- Location within Azerbaijan Location within East Zangezur Economic Region
- Coordinates: 39°50′20″N 46°30′54″E
- Country: Azerbaijan
- District: Lachin
- Time zone: UTC+4 (AZT)
  - Summer (DST): UTC+5 (AZT)

Fərraş (Farrash) is a village in the Lachin District of Azerbaijan.
