= Shirez Rural District =

Rural district in Kermanshah province, Iran

Shirez Rural District Persian: دهستان شيرز
- Rural District
- Location within Iran
- Coordinates: 34°19′27″N 47°31′03″E
- Country: Iran
- Province: Kermanshah
- County: Harsin
- District: Bisotun
- Capital: Chehr

Population (2016)
  - Total: 5,098
- Time zone: UTC+3:30 (IRST)

Shirez Rural District (Persian: دهستان شيرز) is in Bisotun District of Harsin County, Kermanshah province, Iran. Its capital is the village of Chehr.

== Demographics ==
=== Population ===
At the time of the 2006 National Census, the rural district's population was 5,496 in 1,301 households. There were 5,129 inhabitants in 1,400 households at the following census of 2011. The 2016 census measured the population of the rural district as 5,098 in 1,490 households. The most populous of its 13 villages was Chehr, with 2,277 people.
