= Chamchamal Rural District =

Rural district in Kermanshah province, Iran

Chamchamal Rural District Persian: دهستان چم چمال
- Rural District
- Location within Iran
- Coordinates: 34°27′24″N 47°22′47″E
- Country: Iran
- Province: Kermanshah
- County: Harsin
- District: Bisotun
- Capital: Bisotun

Population (2016)
  - Total: 12,499
- Time zone: UTC+3:30 (IRST)

Chamchamal Rural District (Persian: دهستان چم چمال) is in Bisotun District of Harsin County, Kermanshah province, Iran. It is administered from the city of Bisotun.

== Demographics ==
=== Population ===
At the time of the 2006 National Census, the rural district's population was 17,222 in 3,930 households. There were 13,069 inhabitants in 3,465 households at the following census of 2011. The 2016 census measured the population of the rural district as 12,499 in 3,536 households. The most populous of its 55 villages was Belverdi-ye Jadid, with 2,188 people.
