= Bisotun District =

District in Kermanshah province, Iran

Bisotun District Persian: بخش بیستون
- District
- Location within Iran
- Coordinates: 34°24′59″N 47°26′33″E
- Country: Iran
- Province: Kermanshah
- County: Harsin
- Capital: Bisotun

Population (2016)
  - Total: 22,539
- Time zone: UTC+3:30 (IRST)

Bisotun District (Persian: بخش بیستون) is in Harsin County, Kermanshah province, Iran. Its capital is the city of Bisotun.

== Demographics ==
=== Population ===
At the time of the 2006 National Census, the district's population was 24,793 in 5,758 households. The following census in 2011 counted 23,305 people in 6,292 households. The 2016 census measured the population of the district as 22,539 inhabitants in 6,521 households.

=== Administrative divisions ===
Bisotun District Population
Administrative Divisions	2006	2011	2016
Chamchamal RD	17,222	13,069	12,499
Shirez RD	5,496	5,129	5,098
Bisotun (city)	2,075	5,107	4,942
Total	24,793	23,305	22,539
RD = Rural District
