= Harsin County =

County in Kermanshah province, Iran

Harsin County Persian: شهرستان هرسین
- County
- Location of Harsin County in Kermanshah province (right, purple)

- Location of Kermanshah province in Iran
- Coordinates: 34°21′N 47°26′E
- Country: Iran
- Province: Kermanshah
- Capital: Harsin
- Districts: Central, Bisotun

Population (2016)
  - Total: 78,350
- Time zone: IRST
  - Summer (DST): UTC+3:30
- Website: Kermanshah CHHTO website

Harsin County (Persian: شهرستان هرسین) is in Kermanshah province, Iran. Its capital is the city of Harsin, 44 kilometres (27 mi) east of Kermanshah, 1,570 metres (5,150 ft) above sea level.

== Demographics ==
=== Language and ethnicity ===
The population is Kurdish and Shi'ite.

=== Population ===
At the time of the 2006 National Census, the county's population was 90,452 in 20,788 households. The following census in 2011 counted 86,342 people in 23,176 households. The 2016 census measured the population of the county as 78,350 in 22,506 households.

=== Administrative divisions ===
Harsin County's population history and administrative structure over three consecutive censuses are shown in the following table.

Harsin County Population
Administrative Divisions	2006	2011	2016
Central District	65,659	63,025	55,637
Cheshmeh Kabud RD	5,172	4,724	4,204
Howmeh RD	8,925	8,334	7,287
Harsin (city)	51,562	49,967	44,146
Bisotun District	24,793	23,305	22,539
Chamchamal RD	17,222	13,069	12,499
Shirez RD	5,496	5,129	5,098
Bisotun (city)	2,075	5,107	4,942
Total	90,452	86,342	78,350
RD = Rural District

== Geography ==
The county is bounded to the north by Sahneh County, to the south by Khorramabad County in Lorestan province, to the east by Nahavand County in Hamadan province and to the west by Kermanshah County.

== Tourism ==
Attractions of the county include the Essaqwand Rock Tombs and the Behistun Inscription.

== See also ==
Media related to Harsin County at Wikimedia Commons
