= Isa Khan (disambiguation) =

Isa Khan may refer to:

- Isa Khan of Bengal, 16th-century Baro-Bhuiyan noble of Bengal
- Isa Khan Niazi, 16th century Afghan noble of the Sur Empire of northern India, in Sher Shah Suri's royal court
  - Tomb of Isa Khan, his located in the UNESCO World Heritage Site of Humayun's Tomb complex in Delhi, India
- Isa Khan Sheykhavand, 17th century Safavid prince who occupied high offices under Shah Abbas I
- Prince Jesse of Kakheti or 'Isa Khan Gorji, Georgian noble, whose career flourished in the service of the Safavid dynasty of Iran
- Jesse of Kakheti or Isā Khān, Safavid-appointed ruler from the Bagrationi dynasty of Kakheti in eastern Georgia from 1614 to 1615
- Isa Khan (Guantanamo detainee 23), United States held Afghani, in extrajudicial detention in Guantanamo Bay
- Isha Khan Choudhury (born 1971), Indian politician
- Ustad Isa, 16th-century architect of the Taj Mahal in Agra, India
- Isa Khan, Iran, a village in West Azerbaijan Province, Iran
- Eshaqvand-e Olya or Isa Khan-e Olya, a village in Kermanshah Province, Iran
- Eshaqvand-e Sofla or Isa Khan-e Sofla, a village in Kermanshah Province, Iran
