= Kalkowshavand =

Kalkowshavand (Persian: كلكوشوند), also rendered as Kalkoshavand, may refer to:

- Kalkowshavand-e Olya
- Kalkowshavand-e Sofla
- Kalkowshavand-e Vosta
