= Pashkaleh =

Pashkaleh (Persian: پشكله), also rendered as Pashgeleh and Pashgaleh, may refer to:

- Pashkaleh-ye Olya, a village in Cheshmeh Kabud Rural District
- Pashkaleh-ye Sofla, a village in Cheshmeh Kabud Rural District
- Pashkaleh-ye Vosta, a village in Cheshmeh Kabud Rural District
