= Mark With A K =

Belgian DJ and record producer

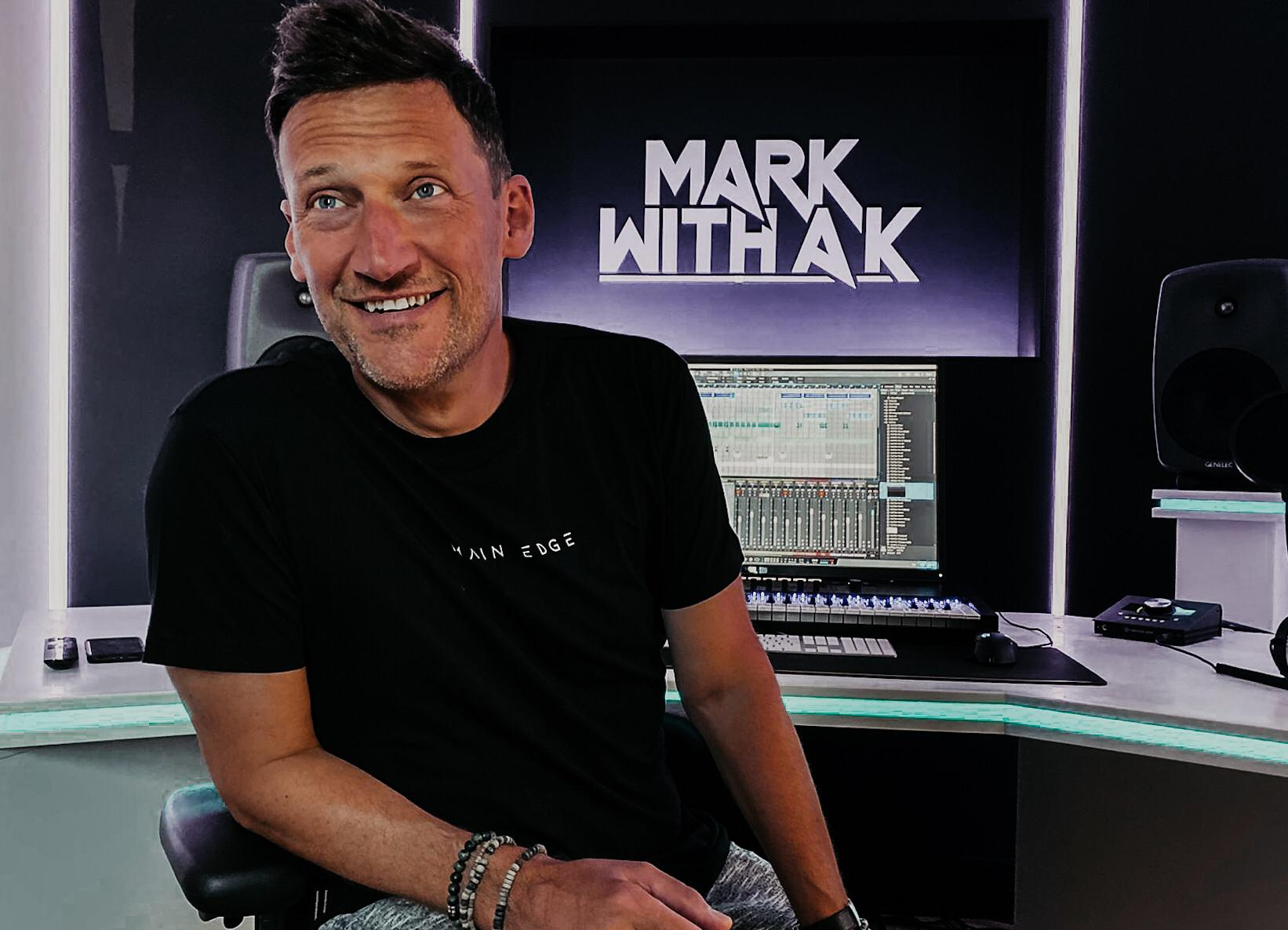

Background information
- Also known as: MWAK
- Origin: Belgium
- Genres: Tekstyle, Hard Dance, Jumpstyle,
- Years active: 2003-present
- Labels: Noize Junky, Zoo Records, B2S, Toff Music
- Members: Mark Carpentier
- Website: markwithak.be

Mark Carpentier (born 10 February 1973) is a Belgian DJ and record producer who performs under the name Mark With a K. He produces and performs music within the hard dance music genre. He has performed at some major hard dance events in Europe.

== Musical Career ==
Mark With A K released his first record "Pure Perfection" with Danny C on db Sounds in 2003. He continued to release his music on various labels including Zoo Records, Digidance and BS2. In 2012, Mark With A K founded his own record label named Noize Junky which is a platform for hard dance music, specifically jumpstyle and tek.

Mark With A K has released five solo albums over his musical career, his first album "My World" was released in 2009, his second "Harder" was released in 2010, his third album "Roll With Me" was released in 2011 and his fourth album, "The Next Level" came out in 2013. His fifth album called "Mass Hysteria" came out in 2018. Apart from his solo releases, Mark With A K has collaborated with other artists within the hard dance genre such as Chris Willis, MC Chucky, Akyra, Ruthless, DJ Coone, Dark-E and Davoodi.

Besides his performances as Mark With A K, Mark is also part of two music groups: Highstreet Allstars and Lords of TEK which also perform hard dance music.

Mark With A K has performed at Decibel Outdoor Festival, Defqon.1 Festival, Mysteryland, Q-BASE, Tomorrowland, Reverze, as well as at many other Q-Dance and B2S events. Over the years, he has performed in Belgium, the Netherlands, Sweden, Germany, France, and Spain.

== Discography ==
Name	Artist(s)	Label	Year
Pure Perfection	Mark With A K vs. Danny C	db Sounds	2003
I Am Stronger	Mark With A K	541	2003
To France	The Highstreet Allstars	Digidance	2006
Drunk	Mark With A K	Zoo Records	2006
On His D**k	Mark With A K	Zoo Records	2006
Lie	Mark With A K	Zoo Records	2006
Big Beat	Mark With A K	Zoo Records	2006
Distorted/What U Got	Mark With A K	Zoo Records	2007
Rock This!	The Highstreet Allstars	Digidance	2007
Don't F**k With Me/Fuel	Mark With A K	GS2	2007
Shake That A**	Mark With A K	Zoo Records	2007
My DJ	Mark With A K	GS2	2008
Bounce Those T--s	Mark With A K	GS2	2008
Kick That Bass	Mark With A K	Zoo Records	2008
Collaboration EP	Mark With A K, DJ Ghost, Danny-C, Nicolas Clays	GS2	2009
My World	Mark With A K	N.E.W.S, DG-Music, GS2	2009
Harder	Mark With A K	GS2	2010
Roll With Me	Mark With A K	Ghosthouse	2011
Blow Your Brainz	Mark With A K	GS2	2011
Moneyshaker	Mark With A K	Crunk'D Records	2012
Big Booty	Mark With A K	Crunk'D Records	2012
Music Is My Alibi	Mark With A K	Noize Junky	2012
Darkside	Mark With A K	Noize Junky	2012
Fly	Mark With A K feat. Maegan Cottone	Noize Junky	2012
Shake That Speaker	Mark With A K	GS2	2012
Forever Young (compilation CD)	Mark With A K	Toff Music	2012
Live Free	Mark With A K feat. Miss Redhead	Noize Junky	2013
Forever Young	Mark With A K	Noize Junky	2013
Bad Motherf*cker	Mark With A K	Noize Junky	2013
Don't F*ck Around	Mark With A K ft. Double H & John Miles Jr.	Noize Junky	2013
The Next Level	Mark With A K	Toffmusic	2013
Krijg Ons Niet Stil	Mark With A K & MC Alee Ft. Ruthless	Noize Junky	2014
Something More	Mark With A K & Chris Willis feat. MC Alee	Noize Junky	2014
Here We Come	Mark With A K ft. Runaground	Noize Junky	2015
My Own Revolution	Mark With A K	Noize Junky	2015
See me now	Mark with a K	Noize Junky	2015
Riot	Mark With A K	Noize Junky	2016
Rise Of The Rejects	Lords Of Tek (MWAK & DJ Bestien)	Noize Junky	2016
Fear Of The Dark	Mark With A K & Warface ft MC Alee	Noize Junky	2016
Love Rules The Universe	Mark With a K	Noize Junky	2016
Let Me See You Butterfly	Lords Of Tek (MWAK & DJ Bestien)	Noize Junky	2017
Big Bad Bass	Mark With a K	Noize Junky	2017
Warrior	Mark With a K & Robert Falcon	Noize Junky	2017
Somebody Like Me	Xillions (Mark With a K remix)	Noize Junky	2017
Send Me An Angel	Mark With a K & Hard Driver	Noize Junky	2018
Little Black Submarines	Mark With a K & Yana	Noize Junky	2019
Heartbeat	Mark With a K & Xillions	Noize Junky	2020
