= Durabad =

Durabad دوراباد
- Village
- Location within Iran
- Coordinates: 34°08′17″N 47°27′48″E
- Country: Iran
- Province: Kermanshah
- County: Harsin
- Bakhsh: Central
- Rural District: Cheshmeh Kabud

Population (2006)
  - Total: 77
- Time zone: UTC+3:30 (IRST)
  - Summer (DST): UTC+4:30 (IRDT)

Durabad (Persian: دوراباد, also Romanized as Dūrābād) is a village in Cheshmeh Kabud Rural District, in the Central District of Harsin County, Kermanshah Province, Iran. At the 2006 census, its population was 77, in 24 families.
