= Garah Ban =

Garah Ban گره بان
- Village
- Location within Iran
- Coordinates: 34°09′08″N 47°23′33″E
- Country: Iran
- Province: Kermanshah
- County: Harsin
- Bakhsh: Central
- Rural District: Cheshmeh Kabud

Population (2006)
  - Total: 122
- Time zone: UTC+3:30 (IRST)
  - Summer (DST): UTC+4:30 (IRDT)

Garah Ban (Persian: گره بان, also Romanized as Garah Bān) is a village in Cheshmeh Kabud Rural District, in the Central District of Harsin County, Kermanshah Province, Iran. At the 2006 census, its population was 122, in 53 families.
