= Meleh-ye Hasan Boqeh =

Meleh-ye Hasan Boqeh مله حسن بقعه
- Village
- Location within Iran
- Coordinates: 34°20′06″N 47°36′17″E
- Country: Iran
- Province: Kermanshah
- County: Harsin
- Bakhsh: Central
- Rural District: Howmeh

Population (2006)
  - Total: 100
- Time zone: UTC+3:30 (IRST)
  - Summer (DST): UTC+4:30 (IRDT)

Meleh-ye Hasan Boqeh (Persian: مله حسن بقعه, also Romanized as Meleh-ye Ḩasan Boq‘eh) is a village in Howmeh Rural District, in the Central District of Harsin County, Kermanshah Province, Iran. At the 2006 census, its population was 100, in 24 families.
