= Elyasvand =

Elyasvand (Persian: الياسوند) may refer to:

- Elyasvand-e Olya
- Elyasvand-e Sofla
