= Sufivand =

Sufivand (Persian: صوفي وند) may refer to a location in Iran:

- Sufivand, Harsin, Kermanshah Province
- Sufivand, Kermanshah
