= Saranjirak =

Saranjirak سرانجيرك
- Village
- Location within Iran
- Coordinates: 34°11′00″N 47°33′00″E
- Country: Iran
- Province: Kermanshah
- County: Harsin
- Bakhsh: Central
- Rural District: Howmeh

Population (2006)
  - Total: 162
- Time zone: UTC+3:30 (IRST)
  - Summer (DST): UTC+4:30 (IRDT)

Saranjirak (Persian: سرانجيرك, also Romanized as Saranjīrak) is a village in Howmeh Rural District, in the Central District of Harsin County, Kermanshah Province, Iran. At the 2006 census, its population was 162, in 32 families.
