= Zazem =

Zazem (Persian: زازم), also rendered as Zazerm and Zazarm, may refer to:

- Zazem-e Olya
- Zazem-e Sofla
