= Meleh-ye Vali =

Meleh-ye Vali مله ولي
- Village
- Location within Iran
- Coordinates: 34°21′10″N 47°36′59″E
- Country: Iran
- Province: Kermanshah
- County: Harsin
- Bakhsh: Central
- Rural District: Howmeh

Population (2006)
  - Total: 69
- Time zone: UTC+3:30 (IRST)
  - Summer (DST): UTC+4:30 (IRDT)

Meleh-ye Vali (Persian: مله ولي, also Romanized as Meleh-ye Valī; also known as Meleh-ye Valeh) is a village in Howmeh Rural District, in the Central District of Harsin County, Kermanshah Province, Iran. At the 2006 census, its population was 69, in 14 families.
