= Ganjevan =

Ganjevan or Ganjavan or Gonjevan (Persian: گنجوان) may refer to:

- Ganjevan, Ilam
- Ganjavan, Isfahan
- Ganjavan, Kermanshah
