= Pariveh =

Pariveh (Persian: پريوه), also known as Parivar, may refer to these places in Iran:

- Pariveh-ye Olya
- Pariveh-ye Sofla

== See also ==
- Parivaar (disambiguation)
