= Komasi =

Komasi (Persian: كماسي) may refer to:

- Komasi-ye Sofla
- Komasi-ye Vosta
