= Eshaqvand =

Eshaqvand (Persian: اسحق وند) may refer to:

- Eshaqvand Dynasty, a 13th- to 16th-century dynasty in western Gilan, modern Iran
- Eshaqvand-e Olya, Iran, a village
- Eshaqvand-e Sofla, Iran, a village
