= Deh-e Sanan =

Deh-e Sanan دهسنان
- Village
- Location within Iran
- Coordinates: 34°12′21″N 47°33′53″E
- Country: Iran
- Province: Kermanshah
- County: Harsin
- Bakhsh: Central
- Rural District: Howmeh

Population (2006)
  - Total: 360
- Time zone: UTC+3:30 (IRST)
  - Summer (DST): UTC+4:30 (IRDT)

Deh-e Sanan (Persian: دهسنان, also Romanized as Deh-e Sanān) is a village in Howmeh Rural District, in the Central District of Harsin County, Kermanshah Province, Iran. At the 2006 census, its population was 360, in 63 families.
