= Davudi (disambiguation) =

Davudi is a village in Bandar Abbas County, Hormozgan Province, Iran.

Davudi may also refer to:

- Ali Murad Davudi, Iranian member of the national governing body of the Baháʼís religion.
- Parviz Davoodi (Parviz Davudi), was an Iranian education and conservative politician.
- Davudi-ye Sofla, village in Howmeh Rural District, in Kermanshah Province, Iran.
- Davudi-ye Olya, village inKermanshah Province, Iran.
