= Hasan Boqeh =

Hasan Boqeh حسن بقعه
- Village
- Location within Iran
- Coordinates: 34°18′35″N 47°37′46″E
- Country: Iran
- Province: Kermanshah
- County: Harsin
- Bakhsh: Central
- Rural District: Howmeh

Population (2006)
  - Total: 153
- Time zone: UTC+3:30 (IRST)
  - Summer (DST): UTC+4:30 (IRDT)

Hasan Boqeh (Persian: حسن بقعه, also Romanized as Ḩasan Boq‘eh) is a village in Howmeh Rural District, in the Central District of Harsin County, Kermanshah Province, Iran. At the 2006 census, its population was 153, in 35 families.
