= Balandar-e Sofla =

Balandar-e Sofla بالندرسفلي
- Village
- Location within Iran
- Coordinates: 34°07′24″N 47°29′11″E
- Country: Iran
- Province: Kermanshah
- County: Harsin
- Bakhsh: Central
- Rural District: Cheshmeh Kabud

Population (2006)
  - Total: 129
- Time zone: UTC+3:30 (IRST)
  - Summer (DST): UTC+4:30 (IRDT)

Balandar-e Sofla (Persian: بالندرسفلي, also Romanized as Bālandar-e Soflá; also known as Bālandar) is a village in Cheshmeh Kabud Rural District, in the Central District of Harsin County, Kermanshah Province, Iran. At the 2006 census, its population was 129, in 23 families.
