= Kalah Hu, Harsin =

Kalah Hu كله هو
- Village
- Location within Iran
- Coordinates: 34°08′13″N 47°25′22″E
- Country: Iran
- Province: Kermanshah
- County: Harsin
- Bakhsh: Central
- Rural District: Cheshmeh Kabud

Population (2006)
  - Total: 99
- Time zone: UTC+3:30 (IRST)
  - Summer (DST): UTC+4:30 (IRDT)

Kalah Hu (Persian: كله هو, also Romanized as Kalah Hū) is a village in Cheshmeh Kabud Rural District, in the Central District of Harsin County, Kermanshah Province, Iran. At the 2006 census, its population was 99, in 18 families.
