= Bagh-e Zeynab, Kermanshah =

Bagh-e Zeynab باغ زينب
- Village
- Location within Iran
- Coordinates: 34°10′16″N 47°23′59″E
- Country: Iran
- Province: Kermanshah
- County: Harsin
- Bakhsh: Central
- Rural District: Cheshmeh Kabud

Population (2006)
  - Total: 125
- Time zone: UTC+3:30 (IRST)
  - Summer (DST): UTC+4:30 (IRDT)

Bagh-e Zeynab (Persian: باغ زينب, also Romanized as Bāgh-e Zeynab) is a village in Cheshmeh Kabud Rural District, in the Central District of Harsin County, Kermanshah Province, Iran. At the 2006 census, its population was 125, in 31 families.
