= Quti Darreh-ye Bala =

Quti Darreh-ye Bala قوطي دره بالا
- Village
- Location within Iran
- Coordinates: 34°09′37″N 47°31′20″E
- Country: Iran
- Province: Kermanshah
- County: Harsin
- Bakhsh: Central
- Rural District: Cheshmeh Kabud

Population (2006)
  - Total: 122
- Time zone: UTC+3:30 (IRST)
  - Summer (DST): UTC+4:30 (IRDT)

Quti Darreh-ye Bala (Persian: قوطي دره بالا, also Romanized as Qūţī Darreh-ye Bālā) is a village in Cheshmeh Kabud Rural District, in the Central District of Harsin County, Kermanshah Province, Iran. According to the 2006 census, its population was 122, comprising 26 families.
