= Sadavand-e Olya =

Sadavand-e Olya سعدوندسفلي
- Village
- Location within Iran
- Coordinates: 34°12′00″N 47°34′00″E
- Country: Iran
- Province: Kermanshah
- County: Harsin
- Bakhsh: Central
- Rural District: Howmeh

Population (2006)
  - Total: 116
- Time zone: UTC+3:30 (IRST)
  - Summer (DST): UTC+4:30 (IRDT)

Sadavand-e Olya (Persian: سعدوندسفلي, also Romanized as Sa‘davand-e ‘Olyā) is a village in Howmeh Rural District, in the Central District of Harsin County, Kermanshah Province, Iran. At the 2006 census, its population was 116, in 20 families.
