= Cheshmeh Mahdi =

Cheshmeh Mahdi چشمه مهدي
- Village
- Location within Iran
- Coordinates: 34°12′57″N 47°31′54″E
- Country: Iran
- Province: Kermanshah
- County: Harsin
- Bakhsh: Central
- Rural District: Howmeh

Population (2006)
  - Total: 90
- Time zone: UTC+3:30 (IRST)
  - Summer (DST): UTC+4:30 (IRDT)

Cheshmeh Mahdi (Persian: چشمه مهدي, also Romanized as Cheshmeh Mahdī) is a village in Howmeh Rural District, in the Central District of Harsin County, Kermanshah Province, Iran. At the 2006 census, its population was 90, in 18 families.
