= Qomlijeh =

Qomlijeh قمليجه
- Village
- Location within Iran
- Coordinates: 34°11′59″N 47°31′42″E
- Country: Iran
- Province: Kermanshah
- County: Harsin
- Bakhsh: Central
- Rural District: Howmeh

Population (2006)
  - Total: 125
- Time zone: UTC+3:30 (IRST)
  - Summer (DST): UTC+4:30 (IRDT)

Qomlijeh (Persian: قمليجه, also Romanized as Qomlījeh; also known as Qomīlījeh) is a village in Howmeh Rural District, in the Central District of Harsin County, Kermanshah Province, Iran. At the 2006 census, its population was 125, in 24 families.
