= Komasi-ye Sofla =

Komasi-ye Sofla كماسي سفلي
- Village
- Location within Iran
- Coordinates: 34°10′19″N 47°29′37″E
- Country: Iran
- Province: Kermanshah
- County: Harsin
- Bakhsh: Central
- Rural District: Cheshmeh Kabud

Population (2006)
  - Total: 152
- Time zone: UTC+3:30 (IRST)
  - Summer (DST): UTC+4:30 (IRDT)

Komasi-ye Sofla (Persian: كماسي سفلي, also Romanized as Komāsī-ye Soflá) is a village in Cheshmeh Kabud Rural District, in the Central District of Harsin County, Kermanshah Province, Iran. At the 2006 census, its population was 152, in 35 families.
