= Pashkaleh-ye Vosta =

Village in Kermanshah, Iran

Pashkaleh-ye Vosta پشكله وسطي
- Village
- Location within Iran
- Coordinates: 34°07′56″N 47°31′54″E
- Country: Iran
- Province: Kermanshah
- County: Harsin
- Bakhsh: Central
- Rural District: Cheshmeh Kabud

Population (2006)
  - Total: 33
- Time zone: UTC+3:30 (IRST)
  - Summer (DST): UTC+4:30 (IRDT)

Pashkaleh-ye Vosta (Persian: پشكله وسطي, also Romanized as Pashkaleh-ye Vosţá) is a village in Cheshmeh Kabud Rural District, in the Central District of Harsin County, Kermanshah Province, Iran. At the 2006 census, its population was 33, in 7 families.
