= Pashkaleh-ye Olya =

Pashkaleh-ye Olya پشكله عليا
- Village
- Location within Iran
- Coordinates: 34°08′54″N 47°30′17″E
- Country: Iran
- Province: Kermanshah
- County: Harsin
- Bakhsh: Central
- Rural District: Cheshmeh Kabud

Population (2006)
  - Total: 41
- Time zone: UTC+3:30 (IRST)
  - Summer (DST): UTC+4:30 (IRDT)

Pashkaleh-ye Olya (Persian: پشكله عليا, also Romanized as Pashkaleh-ye ‘Olyā; also known as Pashgeleh-ye ‘Olyā) is a village in Cheshmeh Kabud Rural District, in the Central District of Harsin County, Kermanshah Province, Iran. At the 2006 census, its population was 41, in 9 families.
