= Sufivand, Harsin =

Sufivand صوفي وند
- Village
- Location within Iran
- Coordinates: 34°15′33″N 47°27′13″E
- Country: Iran
- Province: Kermanshah
- County: Harsin
- Bakhsh: Central
- Rural District: Howmeh

Population (2006)
  - Total: 467
- Time zone: UTC+3:30 (IRST)
  - Summer (DST): UTC+4:30 (IRDT)

Sufivand (Persian: صوفي وند, also Romanized as Şūfīvand; also known as Şūfīyehvand) is a village in Howmeh Rural District, in the Central District of Harsin County, Kermanshah Province, Iran. At the 2006 census, its population was 467, in 87 families.
