= Davudi-ye Olya =

Davudi-ye Olya داودي عليا
- Village
- Location within Iran
- Coordinates: 34°14′17″N 47°37′59″E
- Country: Iran
- Province: Kermanshah
- County: Harsin
- Bakhsh: Central
- Rural District: Howmeh

Population (2006)
  - Total: 44
- Time zone: UTC+3:30 (IRST)
  - Summer (DST): UTC+4:30 (IRDT)

Davudi-ye Olya (Persian: داودي عليا, also Romanized as Dāvūdī-ye ‘Olyā; also known as Dāvūdī-ye Bālā) is a village in Howmeh Rural District, in the Central District of Harsin County, Kermanshah Province, Iran. At the 2006 census, its population was 44, in 7 families.
