= Komasi-ye Vosta =

Komasi-ye Vosta كماسي وسطي
- Village
- Location within Iran
- Coordinates: 34°10′47″N 47°30′47″E
- Country: Iran
- Province: Kermanshah
- County: Harsin
- Bakhsh: Central
- Rural District: Cheshmeh Kabud

Population (2006)
  - Total: 89
- Time zone: UTC+3:30 (IRST)
  - Summer (DST): UTC+4:30 (IRDT)

Komasi-ye Vosta (Persian: كماسي وسطي, also Romanized as Komāsī-ye Vosţá; also known as Komāsī) is a village in Cheshmeh Kabud Rural District, in the Central District of Harsin County, Kermanshah Province, Iran. At the 2006 census, its population was 89, in 19 families.
