= Kalkowshavand-e Sofla =

Kalkowshavand-e Sofla كلكوشوندسفلي
- Village
- Location within Iran
- Coordinates: 34°13′07″N 47°30′48″E
- Country: Iran
- Province: Kermanshah
- County: Harsin
- Bakhsh: Central
- Rural District: Howmeh

Population (2006)
  - Total: 155
- Time zone: UTC+3:30 (IRST)
  - Summer (DST): UTC+4:30 (IRDT)

Kalkowshavand-e Sofla (Persian: كلكوشوندسفلي, also Romanized as Kalkowshavand-e Soflá; also known as Kalkoshavand-e Soflá and Kalkowshavand-e Pā’īn) is a village in Howmeh Rural District, in the Central District of Harsin County, Kermanshah Province, Iran. At the 2006 census, its population was 155, in 31 families.
