= Zazem-e Olya =

Zazem-e Olya زازم عليا
- Village
- Location within Iran
- Coordinates: 34°17′18″N 47°40′01″E
- Country: Iran
- Province: Kermanshah
- County: Harsin
- Bakhsh: Central
- Rural District: Howmeh

Population (2006)
  - Total: 29
- Time zone: UTC+3:30 (IRST)
  - Summer (DST): UTC+4:30 (IRDT)

Zazem-e Olya (Persian: زازم عليا, also Romanized as Zāzem-e ʿlīā) is a village in Howmeh Rural District, in the Central District of Harsin County, Kermanshah Province, Iran. At the 2006 census, its population was 29, in 7 families.
