= Zazem-e Sofla =

Zazem-e Sofla زازم سفلي
- Village
- Location within Iran
- Coordinates: 34°17′21″N 47°39′27″E
- Country: Iran
- Province: Kermanshah
- County: Harsin
- Bakhsh: Central
- Rural District: Howmeh

Population (2006)
  - Total: 213
- Time zone: UTC+3:30 (IRST)
  - Summer (DST): UTC+4:30 (IRDT)

Zazem-e Sofla (Persian: زازم سفلي, also Romanized as Zāzem-e Soflá; also known as Zazarm, Zāzarm-e Soflá, Zazarm Pāin, Zāzerm-e Pā’īn, Zāzerm-e Pā’īn, and Zāzerm-e Soflá) is a village in Howmeh Rural District, in the Central District of Harsin County, Kermanshah Province, Iran. At the 2006 census, its population was 213, in 51 families.
