= Elyasvand-e Sofla =

Elyasvand-e Sofla الياسوندسفلي
- Village
- Location within Iran
- Coordinates: 34°15′03″N 47°28′49″E
- Country: Iran
- Province: Kermanshah
- County: Harsin
- Bakhsh: Central
- Rural District: Howmeh

Population (2006)
  - Total: 299
- Time zone: UTC+3:30 (IRST)
  - Summer (DST): UTC+4:30 (IRDT)

Elyasvand-e Sofla (Persian: الياسوندسفلي, also Romanized as Elyāsvand-e Soflá; also known as Elyāsvand-e Pā'īn) is a village in Howmeh Rural District, in the Central District of Harsin County, Kermanshah Province, Iran. At the 2006 census, its population was 299, in 53 families.
