= Tamark =

Village in Kermanshah province, Iran

Tamark Persian: تمرك
- Village
- Location within Iran
- Coordinates: 34°15′44″N 47°39′26″E
- Country: Iran
- Province: Kermanshah
- County: Harsin
- District: Central
- Rural District: Howmeh

Population (2016)
  - Total: 1,478
- Time zone: UTC+3:30 (IRST)

Tamark (Persian: تمرك) (Note: Also known as Tamarg) is a village in Howmeh Rural District of the Central District of Harsin County, Kermanshah province, Iran.

== Demographics ==
=== Population ===
At the time of the 2006 National Census, the village's population was 1,575 in 357 households. The following census in 2011 counted 1,648 people in 422 households. The 2016 census measured the population of the village as 1,478 people in 412 households. It was the most populous village in its rural district.
