= Pariveh-ye Olya =

Pariveh-ye Olya پريوه عليا
- Village
- Location within Iran
- Coordinates: 34°17′06″N 47°31′05″E
- Country: Iran
- Province: Kermanshah
- County: Harsin
- Bakhsh: Central
- Rural District: Howmeh

Population (2006)
  - Total: 110
- Time zone: UTC+3:30 (IRST)
  - Summer (DST): UTC+4:30 (IRDT)

Pariveh-ye Olya (Persian: پريوه عليا, also Romanized as Parīveh-ye ‘Olyā; also known as Parīvak, Parīvar-e Bālā, Parīveh, and Parīveh-ye Bālā) is a village in Howmeh Rural District, in the Central District of Harsin County, Kermanshah Province, Iran. At the 2006 census, its population was 110, in 23 families.
