= Elyasvand-e Olya =

Elyasvand-e Olya الياسوندعليا
- Village
- Location within Iran
- Coordinates: 34°15′16″N 47°29′05″E
- Country: Iran
- Province: Kermanshah
- County: Harsin
- Bakhsh: Central
- Rural District: Howmeh

Population (2006)
  - Total: 357
- Time zone: UTC+3:30 (IRST)
  - Summer (DST): UTC+4:30 (IRDT)

Elyasvand-e Olya (Persian: الياسوندعليا, also Romanized as Elyāsvand-e ‘Olyā; also known as Elyāsvand-e Bālā) is a village in Howmeh Rural District, in the Central District of Harsin County, Kermanshah Province, Iran. At the 2006 census, its population was 357, in 70 families.
