= Kalkowshavand-e Vosta =

Kalkowshavand-e Vosta كلكوشوندوسطي
- Village
- Location within Iran
- Coordinates: 34°12′34″N 47°30′43″E
- Country: Iran
- Province: Kermanshah
- County: Harsin
- Bakhsh: Central
- Rural District: Howmeh

Population (2006)
  - Total: 128
- Time zone: UTC+3:30 (IRST)
  - Summer (DST): UTC+4:30 (IRDT)

Kalkowshavand-e Vosta (Persian: كلكوشوندوسطي, also Romanized as Kalkowshavand-e Vosţá; also known as Kalkoshavand-e Vosţá and Kalkowshavand-e Mīānī) is a village in Howmeh Rural District, in the Central District of Harsin County, Kermanshah Province, Iran. At the 2006 census, its population was 128, in 24 families.
