= Davudi-ye Sofla =

Davudi-ye Sofla داودي سفلي
- Village
- Location within Iran
- Coordinates: 34°14′35″N 47°36′37″E
- Country: Iran
- Province: Kermanshah
- County: Harsin
- Bakhsh: Central
- Rural District: Howmeh

Population (2006)
  - Total: 68
- Time zone: UTC+3:30 (IRST)
  - Summer (DST): UTC+4:30 (IRDT)

Davudi-ye Sofla (Persian: داودي سفلي, also Romanized as Dāvūdī-ye Soflá; also known as Dāvūdī-ye Pā'īn) is a village in Howmeh Rural District, in the Central District of Harsin County, Kermanshah Province, Iran. At the 2006 census, its population was 68, in 14 families.
