= Pariveh-ye Sofla =

Pariveh-ye Sofla پريوه سفلي
- Village
- Location within Iran
- Coordinates: 34°17′26″N 47°30′30″E
- Country: Iran
- Province: Kermanshah
- County: Harsin
- Bakhsh: Central
- Rural District: Howmeh

Population (2006)
  - Total: 1,081
- Time zone: UTC+3:30 (IRST)
  - Summer (DST): UTC+4:30 (IRDT)

Pariveh-ye Sofla (Persian: پريوه سفلي, also Romanized as Parīveh-ye Soflá; also known as Parīvar-e Pā’īn, Parīveh, and Parīveh-ye Pā’īn) is a village in Howmeh Rural District, in the Central District of Harsin County, Kermanshah Province, Iran. At the 2006 census, its population was 1,081, in 264 families.
