= Cheshmeh Kabud, Harsin =

Village in Kermanshah province, Iran

Cheshmeh Kabud Persian: چشمه كبود
- Village
- Location within Iran
- Coordinates: 34°10′03″N 47°28′01″E
- Country: Iran
- Province: Kermanshah
- County: Harsin
- District: Central
- Rural District: Cheshmeh Kabud

Population (2016)
  - Total: 1,367
- Time zone: UTC+3:30 (IRST)

Cheshmeh Kabud (Persian: چشمه كبود) (Note: Also romanized as Cheshmeh Kabūd) is a village in, and the capital of, Cheshmeh Kabud Rural District of the Central District of Harsin County, Kermanshah province, Iran.

== Demographics ==
=== Population ===
At the time of the 2006 National Census, the village's population was 1,589 in 301 households. The following census in 2011 counted 1,445 people in 334 households. The 2016 census measured the population of the village as 1,367 people in 370 households. It was the most populous village in its rural district.
