= Kalkowshavand-e Olya =

Kalkowshavand-e Olya كلكوشوندعليا
- Village
- Location within Iran
- Coordinates: 34°12′20″N 47°30′08″E
- Country: Iran
- Province: Kermanshah
- County: Harsin
- Bakhsh: Central
- Rural District: Howmeh

Population (2006)
  - Total: 229
- Time zone: UTC+3:30 (IRST)
  - Summer (DST): UTC+4:30 (IRDT)

Kalkowshavand-e Olya (Persian: كلكوشوندعليا, also Romanized as Kalkowshavand-e ‘Olyā; also known as Kalkoshavand-e ‘Olyā and Kalkowshavand-e Bālā) is a village in Howmeh Rural District, in the Central District of Harsin County, Kermanshah Province, Iran. At the 2006 census, its population was 229, in 45 families.
