= Choqa Kabud, Harsin =

Village in Kermanshah province, Iran

Choqa Kabud Persian: چقاكبود
- Village
- Location within Iran
- Coordinates: 34°16′41″N 47°28′38″E
- Country: Iran
- Province: Kermanshah
- County: Harsin
- District: Central
- Rural District: Howmeh

Population (2016)
  - Total: 108
- Time zone: UTC+3:30 (IRST)

Choqa Kabud (Persian: چقاكبود) (Note: Also romanized as Choqā Kabūd) is a village in, and the capital of, Howmeh Rural District of the Central District of Harsin County, Kermanshah province, Iran.

== Demographics ==
=== Population ===
At the time of the 2006 National Census, the village's population was 182 in 48 households. The following census in 2011 counted 136 people in 38 households. The 2016 census measured the population of the village as 108 people in 30 households.
