= Eshaqvand-e Olya =

Eshaqvand-e Olya اسحق وندعليا
- Village
- Location within Iran
- Coordinates: 34°14′21″N 47°26′52″E
- Country: Iran
- Province: Kermanshah
- County: Harsin
- Bakhsh: Central
- Rural District: Cheshmeh Kabud

Population (2006)
  - Total: 161
- Time zone: UTC+3:30 (IRST)
  - Summer (DST): UTC+4:30 (IRDT)

Eshaqvand-e Olya (Persian: اسحق وندعليا, also Romanized as Esḩāqvand-e ‘Olyā; also known as ‘Īsá Khān Bālā and ‘Īsá Khān-e ‘Olyā) is a village in Cheshmeh Kabud Rural District, in the Central District of Harsin County, Kermanshah Province, Iran. At the 2006 census, its population was 161, in 28 families.
