= Reverze =

Annual hard dance festival in Belgium

Coordinates: 51.2311°N 4.4411°E

Reverze is an annual international music event held in the Sportpaleis and Lotto Arena in Antwerp, Belgium. Represented music genres are Jumpstyle, hardstyle and hardcore. The previous edition was held on 1 & 2 March 2024 and was the 20th anniversary of Reverze. Every year, Bass Events designs a poster for Reverze that represents the theme of that year.

== Disk jockeys ==
Every edition of Reverze is represented by disk jockeys from different countries in Western Europe. In the second (2007) edition there were 40 disk jockeys to play. The sportpaleis is divided into 2 or 3 parts, or areas. Every year an anthem has been made by a DJ.

== Anthems ==
Year	Anthem
2006	Coone – Infected
2007	Coone – The Chosen One
2008	Dark-E – Gods and symbols
2009	Coone ft. D-Block & S-te-Fan – Creation of Life
2010	Brennan Heart – Revelations
2011	Frontliner – Call of the visionary
2012	Psyko Punkz – Beyond Belief
2013	Ran-D – Dimensions
2014	Audiofreq – Guardians of Time
2015	Brennan Heart – Illumination
2016	Coone – Deception
2017	Hard Driver – Interconnected
2018	Da Tweekaz – Essence of Eternity
2019	Keltek – Edge of Existence
2020	Coone x Da Tweekaz x Hard Driver – Power of Perception
2021	Refuzion - Wake Of The Warrior
2022	Brennan Heart - Time Will Tell
2023	Sound Rush - Synergy
2024	Sub Zero Project - Maze of Memories
2025	Rebelion - Chain Reaction
2026	Hard Driver x Sound Rush - Beyond Boundaries

== Line-up (2006) ==
Area 1 (infected)	Area 2 (quarantine)	Area 3 (contaminated)
Marcel Woods, dj Dark-E, Ghost, Coone, Ruthless, Greg C, Showtek (Live), Deepack, Darkraver, Outblast	Lethal Mg, Chicago Zone, eb B, Marcky, Furax, Q-ic, D-Feat, Massiv, The Rebel, Lobotomy Inc (Live), Major Bryce, Tranceball, Franky, Jones, Bountyhunter	The Playboyz, G-Tonix, Robbie Magura, Tony, dj Francois, Bad Boyz, Isaac, Genius, Yves, Kristof, dj Mc Chucky

== Line-up (2007) ==
Area 1 (Are you the Chosen One?)	Area 2 (Have you seen the signs yet?)	Area 3 (Do you believe there's more?)
Francois, Massiv VS The Rebel, Dark-e VS D-Feat, Greg C Live, Ronald V VS E-Max, Coone, Q-IC Live, Ruthless, The Prophet, Technoboy, Promo	Stone, Lethal MG, Binum, The Playboyz VS Tek Soldierz, Marcky VS Pat B, DJ Mystery, Bad Boyz VS Genius, Lobotomy Inc VS Chicago Zone, Dr Rude, Deepack, Headhunterz live	Franky Jones, DJ Ghost, Da Boy Tommy & Da Rick, Poogie Bear VS DJ Tronic, DJ Rob & MC Joe, Vince, Darkraver, Paul Elstak, DJ Yves VS Kristof en MC Chucky

== Line-up (2008) ==
Area 1 MAIN, Sportpaleis	Area 2 Lotto Arena	Area 3 Hospitallity Center (VIP)
Francois, Playboyz vs Tek Soldierz, Q-IC, Dj Ghost, Binum vs Ronald V, Dj Dark-E, Chicago Zone, Secret Act... (Da Boy Tommy & Da Rick), Coone vs Ruthless, D-Block & S-te-Fan, Deepack, Donkey Rollers, Tatanka, Chillage, Darkraver vs Vince	Mark with a K, Dr Rude vs E-Max, Lobotomy Inc vs Greg C, Noise Provider vs Manu Kenton, Lethal MG, Noisecontrollers, Headhunterz, Brennan Heart, Zatox vs Activator, Korsakoff, Dj Panic vs Evil Activities, Dj Promo	Jones vs Sjoekoe, Dj Gave, Elektrostan, Samuel Sanders, Karl F, Dj Dess, Scope DJ, Wildstylez, Frontliner, Vicious D & Larsson

== Line-up (2009) - Creation of Life ==
Mainstage (Sportpaleis)	Lotto Arena (VIP)
Dark-E, Gave, Lethal MG, Q-ic, Coone, D-Block & S-te-Fan, Activator, Stephy, Headhunterz, Wildstylez, Noisecontrollers, Dr. Rude, Playboyz. Deepack, Korsakoff, Angerfist	Jones vs Sjoekoe, Demoniak, Qatja S, E-Max, Greg C, Fenix, Instigator, Mystery, Josh & Wesz, Scope DJ, Izaäk, Psyko Punkz, Vicious D & Larsson, Art of Fighters, The Stunned Guys, The Viper, Vince

== Line-up (2010) - Revelations ==
Main Room	VIP Room
Jones vs Sjoekoe, Q-ic Live, Mark with a K, Demoniak, Fenix, Psyko Punkz, D-Block & S-te-fan, Showtek, Brennan Heart, Dr Rude vs Ruthless, Coone vs Deepack, Zany, Endymion, Tommyknocker vs Noize Suppressor	Dr Phunk, Bestien, Nicolas Clays, Davoodi, Playboyz vs Dark-E, Transfarmers, Josh & Wesz, A-lusion, B Front vs Ran-D, Crypsis, AVIO, DJ D, Partyraiser

== Line-up (2011) - Call of the Visionary ==
Sportpaleis	Lotto Arena
Bestien, D-Block & S-te-Fan, Davoodi, Demoniak, Dr. Rude, Dr.Phunk, Jones, Lethal MG, Partyraiser, Psyko Punkz, Q-ic, Royal S, Ruthless, Zatox, Ambassador Inc, Evil Activities, Frontliner, Mark with a K, Noisecontrollers, MC Chucky, MC Villain	Abyss & Judge, Alpha², Amnesys, B-Front, Bioweapon, Coone, Da Tweekaz, Endymion, Isaac, Korsakoff, Nosferatu, Outblast, Ran-D, Stephanie, The Stunned Guys, The Vision, Wildstylez, Second Identity, MC Da Syndrome

== Line-up (2012) - Beyond Belief ==
Sportpaleis	Lotto Arena
Gave, Dr Phunk, Demoniak, Lords of Tek, Transfarmers, Da Tweekaz, Coone, Headhunterz, Psyko Punkz, Zatox, Reverze Flashback, Wildstylez, B-Front, Art of Fighters, Neophyte vs The Viper, MC Chucky, MC Villain	In-Phase, Wasted Penguinz, The Pitcher vs Slim Shore, Brennan Heart, Toneshifterz, Audiofreq, Frontliner, Code Black, Hard Driver, Alpha², Gunz for Hire, Korsakoff, Endymion vs Evil Activities, Mad Dog, MC DV8

== Line-up (2013) - Dimensions ==
Sportpaleis	Lotto Arena
Noisecontrollers, Coone, Frontliner, Brennan Heart, Psyko Punkz, D-Block & S-te-Fan, Ran-D, Isaac, Mark with a K, Crypsis, Korsakoff, Da Tweekaz, Darkraver, Hard Driver, Ruthless, Reverze Flashback, Dr. Rude, MC Villain	Adaro, Angerfist, B-Front, Code Black, Frequencerz, Noize Suppressor, Audiofreq, Endymion, Radical Redemption, Deepack, Josh & Wesz, Davoodi, Phuture Noize, Bestien, Demon Phunk Live, Def Toys, Akyra, Qrank, MC Chucky, MC DV8

== Line-up (2014) - Guardians of Time ==
Sportpaleis	Lotto Arena
Headhunterz, Coone, Frontliner, Zatox, Angerfist, Audiofreq, Da Tweekaz, Hard Driver, Psyko Punkz, Frequencerz, Outlander, Neilio, Dark-E, Reverze Flashback, MC Villain	Mark with a K, Adaro (replaced by B-Front), Radical Redemption Live, Mad Dog, Wasted Penguinz, Davoodi, Art of Fighters, Digital Punk, Bestien, Atmozfears, Phuture Noize, Outbreak Live, Demoniak Live, Akyra, MC Chucky

== Line-up (2015) - Illumination ==
Sportpaleis	Lotto Arena
Brennan Heart, Zatox, Mark With a K Live, Da Tweekaz, Radical Redemption, Psyko Punkz, Hard Driver Live, Wasted Penguinz, TNT aka Technoboy & Tuneboy, Dark-E, Ruthless, Noize Suppressor, Dr Rude, Reverze Flashback, MC Villain, MC Chucky	Adaro, Frequencerz, Digital Punk, Endymion, E-Force, Titan, Noize Junky Showcase, Deepack, Phuture Noize Live, The Vision, Art of Fighters Live, Lowriderz, Akyra, Remento, MC Da Syndrome

== Line-up (2016) - Deception ==
Sportpaleis	Lotto Arena
Lowriderz, NSCLT, Mark With A K & MC Chucky (Live), Atmozfears, Code Black, Coone, Brennan Heart, Reverze Flashback (Pat B), Gunz For Hire (Live), Hard Driver, B-Freqz (Live), Angerfist, MC Villain	Unsenses, Cyber, Sephyx, Josh & Wesz, Psyko Punkz, Sub Zero Project (Live), Deetox, Requiem vs Titan, Act of Rage vs Sub Sonik, Radical Redemption, Warface, Miss K8, MC DL, MC DV8

== Line-up (2017) - Interconnected ==
Sportpaleis	Lotto Arena
Cyber, Audiotricz, Sephyx, Mark With A K ft. MC Chucky (Live), Da Tweekaz, Coone, Psyko Punkz, Hard Driver (Live), Zatox, "Reverze Flashback" by Dark-E & Pat B & Dr Rude, Frequencerz, Sub Zero Project (Live), Minus Militia (Live), Miss K8, MC Villain	Refuzion, Unsenses, Lowriderz, Wasted Penguinz, Mandy, NSCLT, D-Sturb, Adaro, Public Enemies, Sub Sonik (Live), War Force (Live), Delete, Korsakoff, Destrucitve Tendencies, MC DL

== Line-up (2018) - Essence of Eternity ==
Sportpaleis	Lotto Arena
Unsenses, Sound Rush, Code Black, Mark With a K & MC Chucky "Mass Hysteria", Coone, Da Tweekaz, D-Block & S-te Fan, Zatox, "Reverze Flashback" by Pat B vs Ruthless, Brennan Heart, Public Enemies (Live), Ran-D, Rebelion ft. MC Livid (Live), Paul Elstak vs The Viper, MC Villain	Ecstatic, Mandy vs. Lowriderz, KELTEK, Devin Wild, Crisis Era, Clockartz, Frequencerz "Stealth Mode", Requiem, Sub Zero Project "The Xprmnt" (Live), Digital Punk, B-Front, Deetox, Adaro, The Sickest Squad, MC DL

== Line-up (2019) - Edge of Existence ==
Sportpaleis	Lotto Arena
Refuzion, Sound Rush, Sephyx vs Devin Wild, D-Block & S-te-Fan "Ghost Stories" (Live), Headhunterz, KELTEK (Live), Coone & Brennan Heart, Tweekacore (Live), "Reverze Flashback" by Dark-E & Pat B, Phuture Noize "Black Mirror Society" (Live), Gunz For Hire (Live), D-Sturb "Level 03 - The Breakthrough" (Live), Radical Redemption Ft. Nolz (Live), Dr .Peacock vs Sefa, Villain, MC Chucky	Lost Identity, Adrenalize, Mandy, JNXD, Hard Driver (Live), Sub Zero Project, Rejecta, E-Force, Regain, Act of Rage (Live), Rebelion, Aggressive Act (Live), Miss K8, Deadly Guns, MC Dash, MC DL

== Line-up (2020) - Power of Perception ==
Sportpaleis	Lotto Arena
Refuzion, Mandy, KELTEK vs. Sound Rush, Psyko Punkz, Brennan Heart "15 Years Reverze Special", The Elite (Coone, Da Tweekaz & Hard Driver), D-Block & S-te-Fan, Sub Zero Project "Rave Into Space" (Live), 15 Years Reverze Flashback (Pat B & Dark-E & Mark With A K & MC Chucky), Warface & D-Sturb "Synchronised", Minus Militia "The Code of Conduct" (Live), Sefa, Angerfist vs Mad Dog, Villain, MC Chucky	Demi Kanon, Jay Reeve vs Primeshock, Adrenalize vs Sephyx, JNXD, Devin Wild "The_Innergame" (Live), Sub Sonik "Kings Never Die", B-Front (Live), Act of Rage, Rejecta, Rebelion "Overdose" (Live), Miss K8 vs. AniMe, Dr. Peacock, GPF x Jizzy "Cumikaze" (Live), D-Fence, MC Dash, MC DL

== Line-up (2021) - Wake of the Warrior ==
Sportpaleis	Lotto Arena
Primeshock, Mandy, Mark With A K & MC Chucky (Live), Sound Rush, D-Block & S-te-Fan, Refuzion (Live), Da Tweekaz, Hard Driver "Chemistry" (Live), Sub Zero Project, "Reverze Flashback" by Pat B, Ran-D, D-Sturb, Act of Rage & Rejecta "Rejectofrage", Dr. Peacock, MC Villain	Jay Reeve, Lowriderz, Audiotricz, JNXD, Aftershock, Phuture Noize, Devin Wild, Frequencerz, B-Front, Vertile "Vertile's Dimension", N-Vitral, Deadly Guns, Partyraiser, MC DL

== Line-up (2022) - Time Will Tell ==
Sportpaleis	Lotto Arena
Adrenalize, Psyko Punkz, Refuzion vs Mandy, TNT, Zatox "Unstoppable" (Live), Brennan Heart, The Elite (Coone, Da Tweekaz & Hard Driver) (Live), Devin Wild "The_Innergame" (Live), Sub Zero Project "Renaissance of Rave" (Live), Reverze Flashback XL (Mark With A K & Ruthless & Dark-E & Pat B & Lethal MG & MC Chucky), Act of Rage (Live), Rebelion, Gunz for Hire, Radical Redemption (Live), Sefa "This Is Sefa" (Live), Villain	Ecstatic, Bassbrain, Atmozfears, KELTEK, JNXD, Sub Sonik, Digital Punk, Sickmode, Vertile, E-Force vs Bloodlust, Killshot "Beastmode" (Live), Riot Shift "Dystopia" (Live), DRS, Spitnoise, MC DL

== Line-up (2023) - Synergy ==
Sportpaleis	Lotto Arena
Coone "A New Decade", Da Tweekaz, Hard Driver "NRG Overload", Sub Zero Project "Psychodelic" (Live), Reverze Flashback (Pat B), Primeshock, Audiotricz, Lowriderz, Mark With A K & MC Chucky, Sound Rush, D-Block & S-te-Fan (Live), Vertile "Vertile's Dimension", D-Sturb, Rooler, Warface, Partyraiser, Villain	Firelite, Galactixx, Refuzion, KELTEK "The Compass", Devin Wild, JNXD & Tellem "Lose Your Sh*t", B-Front vs. Phuture Noize, Thyron vs. Aversion, Rejecta "The Chromium Key", Act Of Rage "Entourage", The Purge "Trippin'", Rebelion pres. Overdose "The Second Dose", Unresolved "Red Blood", Cryex, Bloodlust "In Blood We Trust", Furyan vs. DRS, MC Da Syndrome

== Line-up (2024) - Maze Of Memories ==
Sportpaleis	Lotto Arena
Adrenalize, Audiotricz & Ecstatic (Progressive Hardstyle), Sound Rush, Lowriderz, Coone, Brennan Heart, Ran-D (Untamed LIVE), Rooler, DJ Ghost vs Furax vs Q-IC (Flashback Origins), D-Sturb vs Vertile (Best Of Both), Warface (R.I.P. – Rave From The Grave LIVE), Act of Rage & Aversion, Angerfist, Partyraiser & Spitnoise, Firelite, Primeshock, MANDY, Mark With A K & MC Chucky, Da Tweekaz (Zero Ducks Given), B-Front & Phuture Noize (The Enlightenment), Sub Zero Project (Robot Ravolution LIVE), Hard Driver (Sinsation showcase), JNXD x Tellem (Lose Control), Pat-B vs Dark-E vs Ruthless vs Lethal MG (Flashback 20 Years), Dreamscape, Rebelion (Overdose – The Final Dose), Mutilator (LIVE), Sefa, Dr. Peacock	Serzo, Jay Reeve (Reevolution LIVE), Psyko Punkz, Devin Wild, Boray, Inpulsa, Imperatorz (Outta CNTRL), Cryex (Band of Color), Thyron (XTREME XTASY LIVE), E-Force (Dark Reality), Bloodlust (The Assassination LIVE), Fraw & Anderex, Dual Damage, Deadly Guns, Barber, Dimitri K

== Line-up (2025) - Chain Reaction ==
Sportpaleis	Lotto Arena
Primeshock, Refuzion, Lowriderz, MANDY, Sound Rush vs Devin Wild, Sub Zero Project, Mish, Warface (LIVE), D-Sturb, Dark-E vs Pat-B (Flashback), Mutilator (Cage of Carnage LIVE), Unresolved vs Rejecta, Miss K8, Jay Reeve, Bassbrain, TNT, Mark With A K, Da Tweekaz, Brennan Heart, Rebelion, Rooler, Hard Driver, Coone (Reverze Flashback), Aversion (LIVE), Dual Damage (LIVE), Barbaric Records (LIVE), Major Conspiracy	Playboyz vs Def Toys, Lethal MG vs Q-IC, DJ Isaac, Coone vs Da Tweekaz, Wildstylez vs Brennan Heart, Max Enforcer (LIVE), Technoboy vs Tuneboy, Adaro vs Frequencerz, Korsakoff vs The Viper, Evil Activities vs Tha Playah, Cardination vs D-Venn, Voidax, Sanctuary vs Omnya, Hard Destiny vs Sparkz, Deezl & So Juice (Cybergore), Toza (LIVE), The Purge, Adjuzt vs Imperatorz, Krowdexx (We The Loudest), Bloodlust (LIVE), The Straikerz, Riot Shift (Dystopia), Kruelty (LIVE), Never Surrender, Satirized vs Noxiouz, Unicorn on K

== Line-up (2026) - Beyond Boundaries ==
Sportpaleis	Lotto Arena
Dark-E, Ruthless vs The Darkraver, Pat-B, Frontliner (LIVE), Noisecontrollers vs Wildstylez, Brennan Heart vs Code Black vs Toneshifterz (We R Classics), D-Block & S-te-Fan, B-Front, Gunz for Hire, Korsakoff vs Nosferatu, Ecstatic, Galactixx, Phuture Noize, Da Tweekaz, Brennan Heart vs Coone, Hard Driver vs Sound Rush, 4 of a Kind (LIVE), Ran-D, Rooler, Mark With A K & MC Chucky (Reverze Flashback), Sickmode vs Vertile, Aversion vs Dual Damage, Deadly Guns, Noxiouz vs Satirized	Serzo, Miss Puss, Mish, MANDY vs The Purge, Rejecta (Patient Zero LIVE), Rebelion, The Saints (Holy Dreams LIVE), Noisemakers (LIVE), Unresolved (Warbound LIVE), Hysta (Dance with the Wolves LIVE), Gezellige Uptempo, Dimitri K vs Yoshiko, D-Charged, Jay Reeve, Bassbrain, Outsiders, Act of Rage (Uncharted LIVE), D-Sturb vs The Straikerz, Warface, Adjuzt (Awake Asleep), Mutilator, Anderex (The Simulation LIVE), Polish Punisher (Phase II LIVE), Omnya vs Sparkz, The Dark Horror, Lekkerfaces, Dr Donk vs GPF
