= Davoodi =

Davoodi (Persian: داوودی) is a surname. Notable people with the surname include:

- Ali Murad Davudi (1922–1979?), Iranian academic and religious official
- Arzhang Davoodi (born 1952), Iranian democracy activist
- Nader Davoodi (born 1963), Iranian photojournalist
- Parviz Goner Davoodi (born 1952), Iranian politician
- Růžena Škodová-Davoodi (born 1948), Czech-German Basketball and chessplayer

== See also ==
- Davudi, village in Hormozgan Province, Iran
