= Eshaqvand-e Sofla =

Eshaqvand-e Sofla اسحق وندسفلي
- Village
- Location within Iran
- Coordinates: 34°14′33″N 47°26′11″E
- Country: Iran
- Province: Kermanshah
- County: Harsin
- Bakhsh: Central
- Rural District: Cheshmeh Kabud

Population (2006)
  - Total: 148
- Time zone: UTC+3:30 (IRST)
  - Summer (DST): UTC+4:30 (IRDT)

Eshaqvand-e Sofla (Persian: اسحق وندسفلي, also Romanized as Esḩāqvand-e Soflá; also known as Esḩāqvand, ‘Īsá Khān-e Pā’īn, ‘Īsá Khān-e Soflá, and Issakvān) is a village in Cheshmeh Kabud Rural District, in the Central District of Harsin County, Kermanshah Province, Iran. At the 2006 census, its population was 148, in 28 families.
