= Parivaar =

Parivaar or Parivar (lit. 'Family') may refer to these Indian films:

- Parivar (1967 film), a 1967 Indian Hindi-language drama film
- Parivaar (1987 film), a 1987 Indian Hindi-language film

== See also ==
- Pariwar, a 2025 Indian Malayalam-language film
- PariWar, an Indian web series
- Parivar Vichora, a gurdwara in Punjab, India
- Parivāra ("accessory" in Pali), the third and last book of the Vinaya Pitaka in Theravada Buddhism
- Sangh Parivar, Hindutva organisations related to the Rashtriya Swayamsevak Sangh
- Basu Poribar (disambiguation)
- Pariveh (disambiguation)
