= Remento =

- Original author: Charlie Greene
- Developer: Heirloom Media Technologies Inc.
- Release: September 2022; 4 years ago
- Platform: Web
- Type: Digital storytelling Personal digital archiving
- License: Proprietary
- Website: remento.co

Remento is an American online platform specializing in family memory preservation through storytelling and storybooks.

== History ==
Remento was founded in 2020 by Charlie Greene and Alex Massonneau in Los Angeles, California, as a project to preserve family memories. Greene's interest in memory preservation began in childhood, inspired by home videos of his father, who died when Greene was ten years old. In 2017, following his mother's cancer diagnosis, Greene conducted an oral history interview to capture her voice, uncovering stories and insights he had never heard before. The name Remento is a Portmanteau of "remember" and "memento."

In September 2022, Remento announced that it had raised funding from Upfront Ventures, along with a group of angel investors, including Chuck Davis, Emmy Rossum, Sam Esmail, Dan Nova (of Highland Capital Partners), and Sarah Harden to further expand its operations.

In November 2023, Remento introduced Remento Book, an AI-based service that generates physical books from recorded family narratives.

In March 2025, Remento appeared in Season 16 of the ABC television series Shark Tank, where it received an investment from Mark Cuban.

== Platform ==
Remento is a storytelling platform that preserves family histories by converting recorded oral narratives into digital and printed formats. Through its Remento Book service, participants can respond to weekly emailed prompts using a web-based recorder. The recording is transcribed using an AI-based system called Speech-to-Story, which generates written versions of the stories. Over the course of a year, these stories are shared digitally and then compiled into a Hardcover book featuring family photos and QR codes linking back to the original recording.
