= Davudi =

Davudi داوودي
- Village
- Location within Iran
- Coordinates: 27°33′32″N 56°26′06″E
- Country: Iran
- Province: Hormozgan
- County: Bandar Abbas
- Bakhsh: Central
- Rural District: Isin

Population (2006)
  - Total: 93
- Time zone: UTC+3:30 (IRST)
  - Summer (DST): UTC+4:30 (IRDT)

Davudi (Persian: داوودي, also Romanized as Dāvūdī, Davodi, and Davoodi) is a village in Isin Rural District, in the Central District of Bandar Abbas County, Hormozgan Province, Iran. At the 2006 census, its population was 93, in 29 families.

== See also ==
- Davudi (disambiguation)
