= Cheshmeh Kabud Rural District =

Rural district in Kermanshah province, Iran

Cheshmeh Kabud Rural District Persian: دهستان چشمه كبود
- Rural District
- Location within Iran
- Coordinates: 34°10′40″N 47°26′16″E
- Country: Iran
- Province: Kermanshah
- County: Harsin
- District: Central
- Capital: Cheshmeh Kabud

Population (2016)
  - Total: 4,204
- Time zone: UTC+3:30 (IRST)

Cheshmeh Kabud Rural District (Persian: دهستان چشمه كبود) is in the Central District of Harsin County, Kermanshah province, Iran. Its capital is the village of Cheshmeh Kabud.

== Demographics ==
=== Population ===
At the time of the 2006 National Census, the rural district's population was 5,172 in 1,077 households. There were 4,724 inhabitants in 1,091 households at the following census of 2011. The 2016 census measured the population of the rural district as 4,204 in 1,131 households. The most populous of its 39 villages was Cheshmeh Kabud, with 1,367 people.
