= Howmeh Rural District (Harsin County) =

Rural district in Kermanshah province, Iran

Howmeh Rural District Persian: دهستان حومه
- Rural District
- Location within Iran
- Coordinates: 34°16′21″N 47°34′08″E
- Country: Iran
- Province: Kermanshah
- County: Harsin
- District: Central
- Capital: Choqa Kabud

Population (2016)
  - Total: 7,287
- Time zone: UTC+3:30 (IRST)

Howmeh Rural District (Persian: دهستان حومه) is in the Central District of Harsin County, Kermanshah province, Iran. Its capital is the village of Choqa Kabud.

== Demographics ==
=== Population ===
At the time of the 2006 National Census, the rural district's population was 8,925 in 1,952 households. There were 8,334 inhabitants in 2,105 households at the following census of 2011. The 2016 census measured the population of the rural district as 7,287 in 1,995 households. The most populous of its 41 villages was Tamark, with 1,478 people.
