= Central District (Harsin County) =

District in Kermanshah province, Iran

Central District (Harsin County) Persian: بخش مرکزی شهرستان هرسین
- District
- Location within Iran
- Coordinates: 34°13′34″N 47°31′17″E
- Country: Iran
- Province: Kermanshah
- County: Harsin
- Capital: Harsin

Population (2016)
  - Total: 55,637
- Time zone: UTC+3:30 (IRST)

The Central District of Harsin County (Persian: بخش مرکزی شهرستان هرسین) is in Kermanshah province, Iran. Its capital is the city of Harsin.

== Demographics ==
=== Population ===
At the time of the 2006 National Census, the district's population was 65,659 in 15,030 households. The following census in 2011 counted 63,025 people in 16,896 households. The 2016 census measured the population of the district as 55,637 inhabitants in 15,940 households.

=== Administrative divisions ===
Central District (Harsin County) Population
Administrative Divisions	2006	2011	2016
Cheshmeh Kabud RD	5,172	4,724	4,204
Howmeh RD	8,925	8,334	7,287
Harsin (city)	51,562	49,967	44,146
Total	65,659	63,025	55,637
RD = Rural District
