= List of cities, towns and villages in Kermanshah province =

A list of cities, towns and villages in Kermanshah Province of western Iran:

== Alphabetical ==
Cities are in bold text; all others are villages.

=== A ===
Ab Barik | Ab Barik | Ab Barik-e Jonubi | Ab Barik-e Olya | Ab Barik-e Shomali | Ab Barik-e Sofla | Ab Barik-e Vosta | Ab Dalan-e Mirki | Ab Sorkh | Abbasabad | Abbasabad | Abbasabad | Abbasabad-e Kol Kol | Abbasabad-e Seh Choqa | Abd ol Aziz | Abd ol Maleki | Abd ol Mohammad | Abdol Khakhi-ye Olya | Abdol Khakhi-ye Sofla | Abdoltajj od Din | Abtaf | Afareyanaj | Afsharabad | Agah-e Olya | Agah-e Sofla | Ahangaran | Ahangaran | Ahangaran | Ahmadabad | Ahmadabad | Ahmadabad | Ahmadabad-e Molla Mas | Ahmadabad-e Olya | Ahmadabad-e Sofla | Ahmadvand | Ainalah | Aineh | Aineh Jub | Ainehvand-e Abdollah | Ainehvand-e Darreh Rashteh | Akbar Jafar | Akbarabad | Akbarabad | Akbarabad | Akbarabad | Akbarabad-e Khaleseh Tappeh Ginu | Akhundi | Ali Akbar | Ali Aqai Hezarkhani | Ali Aqai-ye Bala-ye Bani Chenur | Ali Aqai-ye Pain | Ali Asan-e Amiri | Ali Bar | Ali Barani | Ali Bolagh | Ali Gorzan-e Olya | Ali Gorzan-e Sofla | Ali Hasan-e Olya | Ali Khanabad | Aliabad | Aliabad | Aliabad | Aliabad | Aliabad | Aliabad | Aliabad | Aliabad | Aliabad | Aliabad | Aliabad-e Avval | Aliabad-e Dizgoran | Aliabad-e Dovvom | Aliabad-e Garus | Aliabad-e Golbanu | Aliabad-e Kashantu | Aliabad-e Kerend | Aliabad-e Kohneh | Aliabad-e Olya | Aliabad-e Sasal | Aliabad-e Sofla | Aliabad-e Yusefi | Alikeh | Alikhani | Alirezavandi | Alirezavandi | Almadin | Alvinehkar | Amaleh-ye Olya | Amaleh-ye Sofla | Amarat | Ameleh | Amid Ali Qasemi | Aminabad | Amir Emran | Amirabad | Amirabad | Amirabad | Amirabad | Amirabad | Ammeh | Amrabad | Anarak | Anarak-e Olya | Anarak-e Sofla | Angaz | Angazban | Anjab-e Buzhan | Anjavarud | Anjirak | Anjirak | Anjirak | Anjireban Avareh Ali | Anjirebus-e Sofla | Anzal | Aqa Berar | Aqbolagh | Aran | Aranlah | Argavary | Argeneh-ye Olya | Argeneh-ye Sofla | Arit | Armani Jan | Asadabad | Aseman Dul | Asgar Khani | Ashbakh | Asheqan-e Abedin | Asheqan-e Musa | Ashrafabad | Asiab Jub | Asiab Jub-e Farmanfarma | Asiab Qermez | Asiab-e Tanureh | Asparazgaleh | Avzin-e Fereydun | Ayenehvand | Ayesheh Dul | Azan Vazan | Azimabad | Azizabad | Azizabad | Azizabad | Azizabad | Azizabad | Azizabad-e Bonavaj | Azmeh Miran | Aznab-e Olya | Aznab-e Sofla | Azreh-ye Mohammad Khan | Azreh-ye Mokarrami

=== B ===
Baba Ali | Baba Aziz | Baba Eskandar | Baba Heyran | Baba Jan-e Palizi | Baba Jani-ye Abd ol Mohammad | Baba Jani-ye Shah Morad | Baba Kamal | Baba Kuseh-ye Olya | Baba Kuseh-ye Sofla | Baba Rostam | Baba Shah Ahmad | Baba Sheykh Ali | Baba Zeyd | Babaha | Baban Yavar-e Azizi | Babanabad | Baban-e Sardar Qasemkhan | Baderban | Badkan | Badrabad | Badreh Gerd-e Salimi | Badrehi | Bagh-e Beyglari | Bagh-e Karambeyg | Bagh-e Tighun | Bagh-e Zeynab | Bahram Bayg | Bahram Vand | Bahramabad | Bakalani | Bakhsh Now Khas | Baktar-e Olya | Baktar-e Sofla | Bala Gabri | Balahi | Balajub | Balandar-e Sofla | Balesht | Balin | Balvan | Ban Ganjab | Ban Meydan-e Abdollah | Ban Nokhvod | Ban Ramazan | Ban Shirvan | Ban Zelan-e Olya | Ban Zelan-e Sofla | Banavachku | Banevreh | Banchia-ye Sofla | Bandar | Bandarabad | Bandareh | Band-e Balut | Bandor-e Olya | Bandor-e Sofla | Bangar-e Olya | Bangar-e Sofla | Bani Bid | Bani Golan | Bani Gomkan | Bani Havan | Bani Hu | Bani Lavan | Bani Miran | Bani Nar | Bani Pariab | Banlarini | Banmazaran | Banrivand | Bansheleh | Bansulab-e Hattem | Bansulab-e Kalbali | Bansulab-e Nam Khas | Bansulab-e Shir Mohammad | Bansulab-e Shirzad | Banureh | Banyaran-e Amir Haqmorad | Banyaran-e Aziz Morad | Banyaran-e Mirza Hoseyn | Banyaran-e Teymur | Bapir-e Sofla | Baqeleh | Baqeleh | Baqeleh-ye Olya | Baqeleh-ye Sofla | Baqerabad Meyanrud | Baqerabad | Baqerabad | Baqerabad | Baqerabad-e Olya | Baqerabad-e Samaleh | Baqerabad-e Sofla | Bar Aftab | Bar Aftab-e Golin | Bara Belutestan-e Palkaneh | Barah Sileh | Baravand-e Olya | Baravand-e Sofla | Bardeh Rash-e Olya | Bareh Gineh | Barfabad-e Olya | Barfabad-e Sofla | Barfi Kushkarri | Barikeh-ye Nezam-e Olya | Barikeh-ye Sadeqi | Barishah-e Beyg Morad | Barishah-e Khuybar | Barkaleh | Barnaj | Barq va Baran-e Olya | Barq va Baran-e Sofla | Barreh Bu Anjirban | Barzeh | Barzelak | Bashirabad | Bashirabad-e Bati | Baskeleh-ye Boruvim | Baskeleh-ye Cheshmeh Sefid | Baskeleh-ye Dar Anbar | Baskeleh-ye Khan Mirza | Baskeleh-ye Vasat | Batman | Bavaleh | Bavian | Bavon Makr | Bayangan | Bazegeh | Bazgir-e Qaleh Parvar | Baziani | Behabad-e Qobasiah | Behabad-e Saleh | Bektashabad | Beleh Kabud | Belehzin-e Olya | Belehzin-e Sofla | Belmaneh-ye Olya | Belmaneh-ye Sofla | Belverdi-ye Jadid | Belverdi-ye Qadim | Benavach | Berenjan | Berimvand | Berimvand | Berimvand | Beryah Khani | Beyg Rezai | Beykzadeh | Beyuleh | Beznabad-e Olya | Beznabad-e Sofla | Bi Abr-e Choqamaran | Bi Bayan | Bi Mush | Bi Nahr-e Olya | Bi Nahr-e Sofla | Biameh | Biameh-ye Olya | Biameh-ye Sofla | Biashush | Bid Sorkh | Bidarvaz | Bidgol | Bidkholah | Bijak Tappeh | Bijaneh | Bileh Hu-ye Olya | Bileh Hu-ye Sofla | Bineh Gerd | Biraqavand | Birdad | Bishgan | Bisotun | Bivand-e Olya | Bivand-e Sofla | Boncheleh | Borhan ol Din | Bostanabad | Boz Gureh | Bozgodar-e Olya | Bozgodar-e Sofla | Bozmirabad | Bulan | Burak | Burakabad | Burakah | Burbur | Burbur

=== C ===
Chafdar | Chafteh | Chahar Divar | Chahar Melan | Chahar Meleh-ye Olya | Chahar Meleh-ye Sofla | Chahar Zabar-e Olya | Chahar Zabar-e Sofla | Chahardah Jofteh | Chahargah | Chal Siah | Chalab-e Bekr | Chalab-e Pain | Chalab-e Qatakeh Bares | Chalabeh | Chalabeh-ye Olya | Chalabeh-ye Sofla | Chalabi | Chalaneh-ye Olya | Chaleh Khani | Chalekah | Cham Cham | Cham Kabud | Cham Kabud | Cham Lameh-ye Osman | Cham Nuzdeh | Cham Rud | Cham Shahi | Cham Sorkh | Cham Surak-e Sofla | Cham Surak-e Vosta | Cham Zereshk-e Choqavian Gol Morad | Cham Zereshk-e Esperi | Cham Zereshk-e Olya | Cham Zereshk-e Sofla | Chaman Esmail | Chaman Zar-e Olya | Chaman Zar-e Sofla | Chaman-e Golin | Chambatan-e Olya | Chambatan-e Sofla | Cham-e Heydar | Chameh | Changareh | Changizah | Chaqa Bahar | Chaqa Gonuzh | Chaqa Hoseyn | Chaqa Narges | Chaqa Zard Baghi | Charkas | Charkhab | Charmaleh-ye Olya | Charmaleh-ye Sofla | Chavoshan | Chegeni-ye Olya | Chegeni-ye Sofla | Chehr | Chelleh-ye Olya | Chenar | Chenar | Chenar | Chenaran | Chenaran | Chenar-e Olya | Chenar-e Sofla | Chenar-e Sofla | Chenar-e Vosta | Chenareh | Chenareh-ye Ali Madad | Chenareh-ye Latif | Chenareh-ye Majid | Cheqa Jangeh-ye Olya | Cheqa Jangeh-ye Sofla | Cheqa Kabud | Cheraghabad | Cheraghabad | Cheraghabad | Cheraghestan | Cheshmeh Bad | Cheshmeh Balvark | Cheshmeh Betal | Cheshmeh Cheragh | Cheshmeh Derazeh | Cheshmeh Gach | Cheshmeh Gelineh | Cheshmeh Gholami | Cheshmeh Gilan | Cheshmeh Godar | Cheshmeh Hajegah Jafari | Cheshmeh Hajegah Shirzadi | Cheshmeh Isa | Cheshmeh Jadar | Cheshmeh Kabud | Cheshmeh Kabud | Cheshmeh Kabud | Cheshmeh Kabud | Cheshmeh Kabud | Cheshmeh Kabud | Cheshmeh Kabud-e Chenar | Cheshmeh Kabud-e Olya | Cheshmeh Kabud-e Sofla | Cheshmeh Kareh | Cheshmeh Khani | Cheshmeh Khosrow | Cheshmeh Mahdi | Cheshmeh Makan | Cheshmeh Miran | Cheshmeh Murineh | Cheshmeh Nezami | Cheshmeh Nush | Cheshmeh Pahn-e Alishah | Cheshmeh Pahn-e Fereydun | Cheshmeh Pahn-e Rashid | Cheshmeh Palang | Cheshmeh Panbeh | Cheshmeh Puneh | Cheshmeh Qaleh | Cheshmeh Qanbar | Cheshmeh Qareh | Cheshmeh Qot | Cheshmeh Sangi | Cheshmeh Sangi | Cheshmeh Sefid | Cheshmeh Sefid | Cheshmeh Sefid | Cheshmeh Sefid | Cheshmeh Sefid-e Aqabeygi | Cheshmeh Sefid-e Shobankareh | Cheshmeh Sefid-e Sofla | Cheshmeh Sefid-e Usin | Cheshmeh Shahrokh Masgareh | Cheshmeh Siah | Cheshmeh Sohrab | Cheshmeh Sorkh | Cheshmeh Sorkh-e Qabr-e Baba | Cheshmeh Turan | Cheshmeh Velgah | Cheshmeh Zangi | Cheshmeh-ye Alucheh | Cheshmeh-ye Bagh | Cheshmeh-ye Baha ol Din | Cheshmeh-ye Beygi | Cheshmeh-ye Biglar | Cheshmeh-ye Gholam Veys | Cheshmeh-ye Mostafa Beyg | Cheshmeh-ye Qader | Cheshmeh-ye Sangi-ye Rutvand | Cheshmeh-ye Seyyed Yaqub | Choghabur-e Kaki | Choghabur-e Rahman | Chomaq Tappeh | Chongor-e Jalilvand | Chongor-e Saminvand | Choqa Bala-ye Olya | Choqa Bala-ye Sofla | Choqa Balk-e Alireza | Choqa Balk-e Khvajeh Bashi | Choqa Balk-e Kuchek | Choqa Balk-e Mohammad Zaman | Choqa Bur-e Darabi | Choqa Chubin | Choqa Elahi | Choqa Ginu | Choqa Gol | Choqa Golan | Choqa Janali | Choqa Kabud | Choqa Kabud | Choqa Kabud | Choqa Kabud-e Olya | Choqa Kabud-e Sofla | Choqa Kalbali | Choqa Khazan | Choqa Maran | Choqa Maran | Choqa Naqd Ali | Choqa Qasem | Choqa Reza | Choqa Safar | Choqa Said | Choqa Shekar | Choqa Zard | Choqa Zard | Choqamaran-e Bargur | Choqa-ye Sefid | Choqazard-e Chupankareh | Choqur Chah | Chorvorish | Chowgan | Chub Deraz | Chub Tashan | Chubineh | Chugolabad | Churizhi

=== D ===
Daichi | Damagh Sefid | Dandaneh | Dangeh-ye Khodayar | Dangi | Dangi-ye Abbas | Dangi-ye Ali Beyg | Dangi-ye Kak Abdollah | Dar Badam | Dar Balut | Dar Balut | Dar Derafsh-e Ebrahim Beygi | Dar Derafsh-e Khanomabad | Dar Derafsh-e Mohammad-e Amin Mirza | Dar Derafsh-e Qaleh | Dar Derafsh-e Seyyed Karim | Dar Gol-e Seyyed Hasan | Dar Gol-e Teymaz | Dar Heydar | Dar Kenar | Darab | Darab | Darabi | Darabi | Darageh-ye Molla Ali Karam | Daramrud-e Olya | Daramrud-e Sofla | Darbadreh | Darband Khizan | Darband Zard | Darband | Darband-e Zard-e Olya | Darband-e Zard-e Sofla | Darbesar | Darbid | Darbid-e Ali Akbar | Darbid-e Hoseyn Ali | Darbid-e Mansuri | Darbid-e Nazer Ali | Dareh Rash-e Mohammad Soltan | Dargah | Dargeh | Dargeh-ye Cheshmeh Said | Dargeh-ye Gholam Ali | Dargeh-ye Khalifeh Qoli | Dari Zanganeh-ye Pain | Darian | Darkhvor-e Aqa Reza | Darkhvor-e Hasanabad | Darmaran-e Olya | Darmaran-e Sofla | Darmur | Darneh | Darnileh-ye Aziz | Darnileh-ye Eskandar | Darreh Asiab-e Rashid | Darreh Badam-e Sofla | Darreh Bayan | Darreh Duzakh | Darreh Khalil | Darreh Lar Abdol Karim | Darreh Maran | Darreh Nijeh | Darreh Vazam | Darreh Yab | Darreh Zhaleh-ye Olya | Darreh Zhaleh-ye Sofla | Darreh-ye Larkarim | Darshademan | Dartut | Dartut-e Movvali | Dartut-e Rahim | Darvaleh-ye Bala | Darvaleh-ye Pain | Darvand | Darvand | Darvand | Darvish Beygeh | Darvishan | Darvit | Dasht-e Murt-e Olya | Dasht-e Murt-e Sofla | Dashtelah-ye Olya | Dashtelah-ye Sofla | Dashti Bolagh | Dashti Leyl-e Hoseynabad | Dastak-e Olya | Dastak-e Sofla | Dastgerdi | Dastjordeh-ye Olya | Dastjordeh-ye Sofla | Davaleh-ye Olya | Davaleh-ye Sofla | Davar Dar Mian-e Sofla | Davazdah Emam | Davudi-ye Olya | Davudi-ye Sofla | Dayar-e Assad Khan | Deh Abbas | Deh Abbasan | Deh Asiab | Deh Asiab | Deh Bagh | Deh Bagh | Deh Bagh | Deh Bala | Deh Cheragh | Deh Gol | Deh Huleh-ye Olya | Deh Huleh-ye Sofla | Deh Khodadad | Deh Kohneh | Deh Kohneh | Deh Mirahmad | Deh Musa | Deh Now | Deh Now | Deh Pahn | Deh Pir | Deh Rash-e Bazan | Deh Sadeh | Deh Sefid | Deh Sefid | Deh Soleyman | Deh Sorkh | Deh Sorkh | Deh Tut-e Sofla | Deh-e Abbas | Deh-e Baugah | Deh-e Elyas | Deh-e Hammzeh | Deh-e Jami | Deh-e Janjan | Deh-e Kabud | Deh-e Khan Jan | Deh-e Kharan | Deh-e Khazal | Deh-e Leyli | Deh-e Moradkhan | Deh-e Qasem | Deh-e Rezvan | Deh-e Sanan | Deh-e Sheykh | Dehlaqin | Dehlor | Dehnow | Dehnow-e Deh Kohneh | Dergah | Derkeh | Desheh | Dezavar | Dilanchi-ye Olya | Dilanchi-ye Sofla | Diven | Dizgaran | Do Ab | Do Ab | Do Cheshmeh | Do Choqa | Do Choqai | Do Tappeh | Doab | Doborji | Dom Badam | Dowkaneh | Dowkushkan-e Hoseynkhani | Dowkushkan-e Reza Khani | Dowlatabad | Dowlatabad | Dowlatabad | Dowlatabad-e Olya | Dowlatabad-e Sofla | Dowlatyar | Dowleta | Dudan | Dugolbandeh | Dulangan-e Olya | Dulangan-e Sofla | Dul-e Elyas | Dul-e Masum | Duleh Khoshk-e Aziz | Dur Dasht | Durabad | Durisan | Dushmian | Dust Vand

=== E ===
Elayiyeh | Elyasan | Elyas-e Mahmud | Elyasi | Elyasi-ye Ahmad | Elyasi-ye Khalifeh Hoseyn | Elyasi-ye Saleh Matta | Elyasvand-e Olya | Elyasvand-e Sofla | Emam Abbas-e Olya | Emam Abbas-e Sofla | Emam Hasan-e Olya | Emam Hasan-e Sofla | Emam Qoli | Emamiyeh-e Olya | Emamiyeh-e Sofla | Emamzadeh Abbas | Eshaqvand-e Olya | Eshaqvand-e Sofla | Eshki | Eslamabad | Eslamabad-e Bezahrud | Eslamabad-e Gharb | Eslamabad-e Olya | Eslamabad-e Sofla | Eslamiyeh | Esmail Aqai | Esmail Kal | Estadabad | Eyl Shirzadi | Eyn ol Qas

=== F ===
Fakhriabad | Falvashan | Faraman | Farj Emam | Farmayisheh Allah Nazer | Farrash | Farrokh Khani | Farsinaj-e Jadid | Faryadras | Fash | Fashkhvoran | Firuzabad | Firuzabad | Firuzabad-e Kuchak | Firuzabad-e Pacheqa | Firuzabad-e Tappeh | Firuzeh | Fuladi | Fuladi-ye Olya | Fuladi-ye Sofla

=== G ===
Gahwareh | Gakiyeh | Gakiyeh | Galam Kabud-e Olya | Galam Kabud-e Sofla | Galianeh-ye Ali Baqer | Gallovij | Galu Darreh | Galuzi | Galuzi-ye Davud | Gamizaj-e Olya | Gand Ab | Gandabad | Gandab-e Olya | Gandab-e Sofla | Gandab-e Vosta | Gandomban-e Olya | Gandomban-e Sofla | Ganjavan | Ganjureh | Garah Ban | Garavand | Gardangah-e Quchemi | Gardeh Now | Gardel Gari Ali Aqa | Gargelan | Garmab | Garmab-e Mohammad Rezavandi | Garmianak | Garrab-e Olya | Garraveh-ye Esmail | Garraveh-ye Nomareh Do | Garus-e Olya | Garus-e Sofla | Gav Bandeh | Gav Panam | Gav Sur | Gaval | Gavanban | Gavchali | Gavdaneh Godar | Gavdaneh Khvor | Gaveh-ye Seyyed Mohammad Hoseyni | Gavgol-e Olya | Gavgol-e Qaleh | Gavmareh | Gavmish Cheran-e Arab | Gavrani | Gavshan-e Olya | Gavshan-e Sofla | Gazaf-e Sofla | Gazan | Gaznahleh | Gazneh | Gel Sefid | Gelal | Gelali | Gelali-ye Jadid | Gel-e Sorkheh | Geli | Genani | Geravand | Geravian-e Sofla | Gerdak | Gerdakan Dar-e Olya | Gerdakan Dar-e Sofla | Gerdakaneh | Gerdakaneh-ye Olya | Gerdakaneh-ye Sofla | Gerdekan Kureh | Gerisheh-ye Sofla | Geyeh Dar | Ghazan Dul Ali Morad | Gheybollah | Ghiasabad | Gij | Gilanbar-e Sofla | Gilan-e Gharb | Gilaneh | Godar Pir-e Olya | Godar Pir-e Sofla | Gol Anjir | Gol Darreh | Gol Darreh-ye Olya | Gol Darreh-ye Sofla | Gol Kheyrak-e Olya | Gol Kheyrak-e Sofla | Gol Tappeh | Gol Zardeh | Golah Jar | Golali | Golam Kabud-e Olya | Golam Kabud-e Sofla | Golbaghi | Gol-e Khatr | Golil | Golin Allah Morad | Goljiran | Golmatabad | Golom Kabud | Gomeshtar-e Olya | Gorazabad | Gorazan-e Olya | Gorazan-e Sofla | Gordi | Goreh Choqa | Gorg Abi Mirza Ali | Gorgan | Gorgavan | Gorgavand | Gorgeh Bisheh-ye Olya | Gorgeh Choqa | Gorgi Dar | Gorgin Darreh | Gorgi-ye Manderek | Gorji Bayan | Goruran-e Chahar Dang | Goruran-e Do Dang | Goruran-e Olya | Goruran-e Sofla | Goveni | Govijeh | Gowdin | Gowhar Chaqa | Gowharabad | Gowhareh | Gur Sefid | Gura Jub-e Baba Karam | Gura Jub-e Morad Beyg | Gura Jub-e Qeshlaq | Gura Jub-e Zeyyed Ali | Gur-e Gavarz | Guri Zardallahi | Gush Boran | Guyaleh

=== H ===
Habashi | Habibvand | Haft Ashian | Haft Ashiyan | Haft Cheshmeh | Haft Cheshmeh | Haft Cheshmeh-ye Jahanshah | Haft Kani | Haft Khaneh | Hajij-e Bozorg | Hajji Alian | Hajji Aziz-e Cheshmeh Sefid | Hajji Fattah-e Beg | Hajjiabad | Hajjiabad | Hajjiabad | Hajjiabad-e Do | Hajjiabad-e Shahlai | Hajjiabad-e Shanrash | Hajjiabad-e Yek | Halan | Halashi | Halateh | Haleh Siah | Hamyanak | Hamzehabad | Hani Garmaleh | Hanulan | Hanyandar | Haramian-e Olya | Haramian-e Sofla | Harileh | Harir | Harsin | Hasan Boqeh | Hasan Gaviyar | Hasanabad | Hasanabad | Hasanabad | Hasanabad | Hasanabad | Hasanabad-e Govijeh | Hasanabad-e Karah | Hasanabad-e Olya | Hasanabad-e Sofla | Hashamar | Hashemabad | Hashilan | Hasht Jofteh | Hasht Pashtuleh | Hemmatabad | Henidar-e Ebrahim Khan | Henidar-e Mafruzeh | Herilabad | Hesar | Hesar-e Sefid | Hesil Qanbareh | Heybatollah | Heydarabad | Heydarabad | Hezar Khani | Hezar Khani | Hezar Khani-ye Olya | Hezar Khani-ye Sofla | Hirvi | Hiurud | Hojjatabad | Hojjatabad-e Olya | Hojjatabad-e Sofla | Hojumabad | Holul | Homajegeh | Homayun Kosh | Homeyl | Horreyn | Hoseynabad | Hoseynabad | Hoseynabad | Hoseynabad | Hoseynabad | Hoseynabad | Hoseynabad | Hoseynabad-e Amjadi | Hoseynabad-e Dartang | Hoseynabad-e Deh Boneh | Hoseynabad-e Quri Chay | Hoseynabad-e Ruintan | Howz-e Seyyed Morad | Howz-e Sheykh-e Zemkan | Hukani-ye Olya | Hukani-ye Sofla | Huker | Hulan | Hurtekah | Hushyar Cheleh

=== I ===
Ilkhaniabad | Iman

=== J ===
Jabbarabad | Jabbarabad-e Olya | Jabbarabad-e Sofla | Jaber-e Sofla | Jaberi | Jabrabad | Jaf Bar-e Simin | Jafarabad | Jafarabad | Jafarabad | Jahanabad | Jahangirvand | Jalalvand-e Olya | Jalalvand-e Sofla | Jalilvand | Jalilvand | Jamasab | Jameh Shuran-e Olya | Jameh Shuran-e Olya | Jameh Shuran-e Sofla | Jameh Shuran-e Sofla | Jamishan-e Olya | Jamishan-e Olya | Jamishan-e Sofla | Jan Ahmad | Jan Ali | Jan Jan | Jangaleh-ye Olya | Jasuskeh | Javanmiri | Javanmiri-ye Olya | Javanrud | Jazar | Jelow Girangeh | Jelow-e Olya | Jelow-e Sofla | Jelugireh-ye Olya | Jelugireh-ye Sofla | Jenan | Jeyhunabad | Jeyran Bolagh | Jivar | Jowzeh-ye Anjirak | Jub Baghan-e Olya | Jub Baghan-e Sofla | Jub Kabud-e Olya | Jujar | Jujar | Juzeh

=== K ===
Kabudeh-ye Olya | Kabudeh-ye Sofla | Kachalabad | Kachek Bel-e Olya | Kachek Bel-e Sofla | Kafru Bavakeh | Kafru Salman | Kah Sara | Kahelabad | Kahrar-e Dejgah | Kahrar-e Mowqufeh | Kahrar-e Olya | Kahrar-e Sofla | Kahriz | Kahriz | Kahriz | Kahriz-e Bid Sorkh | Kahriz-e Hajji Morad Khan | Kahriz-e Kalan | Kahriz-e Kur Bolagh | Kahriz-e Olya | Kahriz-e Qaleh Kohneh | Kahriz-e Sofla | Kahtar | Kak Mirki | Kakiha | Kal Davud | Kal Godar | Kal Kash | Kal Sefid | Kalah Hu | Kalak Jafar | Kalak-e Amjadi | Kalantar | Kalareh-ye Mehrabi | Kalareh-ye Zhaleh | Kalashi-ye Abdol Qader | Kalashi-ye Nahang | Kalaveh | Kalaveh | Kalaveh-ye Heydar Khan | Kalbiabad | Kalegah-e Amid Ali | Kalegah-e Zaman | Kaleh-ye San | Kaleh-ye Zard | Kalek-e Bayeh | Kalek-e Olya | Kalian-e Olya | Kalian-e Sofla | Kalian-e Vosta | Kalkan-e Aftabru | Kalkan-e Nesar | Kalkowshavand-e Olya | Kalkowshavand-e Sofla | Kalkowshavand-e Vosta | Kalkushk | Kalleh Jub | Kalleh Jub | Kalley | Kam Shur | Kama Darreh | Kamak | Kamalabad | Kamalgir | Kamar Surakh | Kamar Zard | Kamarab | Kamareh Gareh | Kamareh | Kamareh-ye Gharbi | Kamareh-ye Olya | Kamareh-ye Sofla | Kamran-e Beyg Reza | Kamran-e Rahman | Kandeh Sorkh | Kandeh-ye Har | Kandkilah | Kanduleh | Kanduleh | Kaneh Har | Kaneh Rashid-e Allah Feqid | Kaneh Rashid-e Arab | Kaneh Rashid-e Babakhan | Kaneh Rashid-e Gol Morad | Kangarban-e Olya | Kangarban-e Sofla | Kangarban-e Vosta | Kangavar | Kani Aziz | Kani Bikheyreh | Kani Danial | Kani Gol-e Olya | Kani Gol-e Sofla | Kani Gowhar | Kani Kabud | Kani Karim Yarvali | Kani Kechkineh | Kani Khanjar | Kani Khazran | Kani Pasha | Kani Rash | Kani Satiar | Kani Sharif | Kani Shirineh | Kanjur-e Olya | Kanjur-e Sofla | Karaj-e Olya | Karaj-e Sofla | Karak Harak | Karam Bast | Kareh-ye Qaleh Kohneh | Kareh-ye Qaleh Sefid | Karfelah | Kargan | Karim Haseleh-ye Olya | Karim Haseleh-ye Sofla | Karimabad | Karimabad | Karimabad | Karkareh | Karkasar | Karkhaneh | Karkul-e Kasan | Karnachi | Karsavan | Karvaneh-ye Olya | Karvaneh-ye Sofla | Karvaneh-ye Vosta | Karyan | Kaseh Garan | Kashanbeh-ye Chahardangi | Kashanbeh-ye Lak | Kashanbeh-ye Sofla | Kashantu | Kashkamir | Kasirabad | Kavar Lavan | Kazazi | Kazem Khani-ye Olya | Kazem Khani-ye Sofla | Kazhak | Kelash Hush | Kelash Quh | Kelineh | Kelineh-ye Paydar | Kenar Marg | Keng | Kerend-e Gharb | Kermajan | Kermanshah | Kezi | Khal Khal | Khalaj Rud | Khalajan | Khalenjah | Khalevan | Khalifeh Bapir | Khalifeh Ha | Khalifeh | Khalilabad | Khalilan-e Olya | Khalilan-e Sofla | Khalilollah | Khamisabad | Khan Jamal-e Panahi | Khan Jamal-e Zamani | Khaneh Beygi | Khaneh-ye Khoda | Khaneqah | Khaneqah-e Olya | Khaneqah-e Sofla | Khaneqah-e Vosta | Khanileh | Khanjarabad | Khanomabad | Khanomabad | Khanomabad | Khapgah | Khar Kosh | Kharagab-e Olya | Kharajian | Kharani | Khargineh-ye Kuik-e Shekar | Khatamabad | Khatuneh | Khazal | Khazang | Khederabad | Khelek | Khersabad-e Bozorg | Khersabad-e Jafari | Kheybar | Kheyrumandan | Khiaran | Khil Fiat Kikan | Khoda Morovvat | Kholeh Kahush-e Olya | Kholeh Kahush-e Sofla | Khomartaj | Khomgaran | Khorkhor-e Sofla | Khorramabad-e Olya | Khorramabad-e Sofla | Khorunan | Khoshk Abkhowreh | Khosravi | Khosrow Basheh | Khosrow Basheh-ye Madeh Zaran | Khosrowabad | Khosrowabad-e Amjadi | Khosrowabad-e Faleh Gori | Khub Yaran-e Olya | Khub Yaran-e Sofla | Khuriabad | Khvorin | Khvorneh-ye Olya | Khvorneh-ye Sofla | Khvoshinan-e Olya | Khvoshinan-e Sofla | Khvoshinan-e Vosta | Khvoshyar | Kileh Sefid | Kimneh | Kisaleh | Kiveh Nan | Kochkineh | Kol Kol | Kolah Deraz-e Olya | Kolah Deraz-e Sofla | Kolah Deraz-e Vosta | Kolah Hu | Kolah Jub-e Esfandiari | Kolah Jub-e Karmi | Kolah Jub-e Olya | Kolah Jub-e Olya-ye Do | Kolah Jub-e Olya-ye Yek | Kolah Jub-e Sofla | Kolah Kabud | Kolah Kabud-e Olya | Kolah Kabud-e Sofla | Kolah Kabud-e Vosta | Kolah Mal | Kolah Pa | Kolah Siah | Koleh Jub | Koleh Savari | Kolehjub-e Dartang | Kolucheh | Kolur | Kolyai | Komasi-ye Sofla | Komasi-ye Vosta | Komeyjeh | Korani-e Olya | Korani-e Sofla | Korani-ye Hashem Soltan | Koreh Jub | Korizagheh | Kortavij-e Olya | Kortavij-e Sofla | Kotkeh | Kotkoti | Kucheh | Kuchkineh | Kugah | Kuhali | Kuik-e Azizi Amin | Kuik-e Hasan | Kuik-e Mahmud | Kuik-e Majid | Kukav | Kulan | Kulaseh | Kulsavand | Kur Bolagh-e Do | Kur Bolagh-e Yek | Kur Sarab | Kuri | Kurian-e Gowra | Kurpeh | Kusehha | Kusehvand | Kushkari-ye Namdar | Kuzaran | Kuzeh Rud | Kuzehgaran

=== L ===
Lachin | Lalabad-e Hoseyn-e Qolikhani | Lalabad-e Kol Kol-e Do | Lalabad-e Kol Kol-e Yek | Lalabad-e Olya | Lalabad-e Seyyed Jafari | Lalabad-e Seyyed Sadeq | Laleh Bag | Laqaleh | Laran-e Olya | Laran-e Sofla | Lashgargah | Lateh Choqa Sayyadan | Lavasani | Layizkarim | Lemah | Lemini | Lenjab | Lilmanaj | Lor | Lorini-ye Ajudani | Lorkhani | Lulem | Lurabi

=== M ===
Maarefi | Mahaki Amin Beyg | Mahaki Naser | Mahmudabad | Mahmudabad | Mahmudabad | Mahmudabad-e Gavkol | Mahmudabad-e Kashantu | Mahmudabad-e Zardab | Majid Qaleh Parvar | Majrilan | Makhvoshin | Mal Amiri-ye Hajj Saadat Karam | Mal Amiri-ye Olya | Mal Amiri-ye Sofla | Maleh Dizgeh | Maleh Rulan | Malek Hasan Yarijan | Malek Khatabi | Malek Tappeh | Malekabad | Malekshah | Mamar Seh | Mamar Yek | Mamenan-e Olya | Mamenan-e Sofla | Manavari | Manderek | Manjeq Tappeh | Mansur Arab | Mansurabad | Mansur-e Aqai | Manuchehrabad | Marantu | Marengaz | Marivani-ye Bidgoli | Marivani-ye Kakiha | Marjan Gomar | Marjan Qeytul | Markhvor | Marshaar | Maryam Negar | Marzaleh | Marzban | Marzbani | Marzelan-e Mohammad Morad | Masgareh | Mast Ali-ye Olya | Mast Ali-ye Sofla | Mavai-ye Olya | Mavai-ye Sofla | Mazidi | Mehdiabad | Mehdiabad-e Olya | Mehdiabad-e Sofla | Mehregan | Melah Bid | Melah Kabud | Melah Rash | Melah Tulat | Melavard | Meleh Avareh | Meleh Beyglar | Meleh Har | Meleh Kabud | Meleh Kabud | Meleh Sheykh | Meleh Sorkh | Meleh Yaqub | Melehaneh | Meleh-ye Hasan Boqeh | Meleh-ye Vali | Menafabad | Merehta | Meserkhan | Meshkenar | Meskinabad-e Olya | Meydan | Meydan | Meydan | Meydan-e Tafalli | Meykhvaran-e Mohammad Aqa | Meykhvaran-e Mohammad Sadeq | Meykhvaran-e Pir Ali Khan | Meykhvaran-e Sadat | Meymaz | Meymun Baz | Meyvan | Mezran | Mian Choqa | Mian Kabud-e Qasem | Mian Mil | Mian Qaleh-ye Talani | Mian Rah | Mian Rahan | Mian Rud | Mian Tang | Mianeh | Miankuh | Mianrud | Mianrud | Mianrud | Miansarvan-e Zardalan | Mil Qader-e Olya | Mil Qader-e Sofla | Mileh Sar | Milkeh-ye Baqer | Milkeh-ye Buchan | Milkeh-ye Shir Khan | Mir Abdoli-ye Olya | Mir Abdoli-ye Sofla | Mir Abdoli-ye Zarrin Choqa | Mir Azizi | Mir Azizi | Mir Azizi | Mir Azizi-ye Qadim | Mir Hasan | Mir Havaryari | Mir Mirab-e Olya | Mir Mirab-e Sofla | Mirabad | Mirabeh | Mirag | Mirakeh-ye Qaleh Qazi | Mirmangan-e Olya | Mirmangan-e Sofla | Mirmingeh | Mirmiru | Mirtaher | Mirza Kuseh | Mirzaabad | Mish Rangin-e Hajji Qader | Mivali Shirkhan | Mivali-ye Darab Khan | Mivali-ye Sofla | Miyantang-e Mansuri | Mohammad Ali Qoregah | Mohammad Alikhani | Mohammad Kesani Nezhad | Mohammad Reza Keyani | Mohammadabad | Mohammadabad | Mohammadabad | Mohammadi-ye Olya | Mohammadi-ye Sofla | Molkhatavi | Molla Amirkhan | Molla Zaman | Mollah Karamineh | Mollah Karamineh-e Shah Morad | Morad Khani Siareh Jagiran | Moradabad | Moradabad | Mostafa Ahmadi | Movali Najaf Chalaveh | Mowmai | Mowmenai | Muderaz Hoseyn | Muineh | Mulanabad | Muli | Murian | Murt-e Hadi | Murt-e Sabz | Musa Naranj | Mushakhan

=== N ===
Naderabad | Nafteh | Nageh | Nahr ol Dowleh | Nahrab-e Deh Rash | Nahrabi | Najafabad | Najafabad | Najjar | Najjar-e Galin | Nal Shekan | Nalband Garji | Namdar | Namivand-e Olya | Namivand-e Sofla | Naraman-e Naqareh Kub | Narvi | Nasrabad Seyyed Hatam | Nasrabad-e Pasha | Nasrabad-e Seyyed Ahmad | Nasrabad-e Seyyed Khalil | Naveh Fereh | Nazarabad-e Olya | Nazargah | Negareh | Nerzhi | Nesar Direh | Nesar Direh-ye Sofla | Ney Pahn-e Abdollah | Ney Pahn-e Seyfollah | Neyesaneh | Neylak | Neypahan | Neyrazh-e Olya | Neyrazh-e Sofla | Nezamabad | Nian | Nilavareh-ye Olya | Nilavareh-ye Sofla | Nimdangi | Nimdangi | Nimeh Kareh | Nimeh Kareh Kani Rash | Nirevand | Nojubaran | Nokhvod Tappeh | Nosmeh | Nosratabad | Now Jub | Now Shakaleh-ye Tarazu | Nowdeh | Nowdeshah | Nowkhan | Nowruleh-ye Olya | Nowruleh-ye Sofla | Nowruzabad | Nowruzabad | Nowshiravan | Nowsud | Nuel | Nukan | Nurabad | Nurabad | Nuraz | Nur-e Olya | Nur-e Sofla | Nuryab

=== O ===
Omar Mel | Osman | Ozgoleh

=== P ===
Pa Emam | Pa Qaleh | Pa Qaleh-ye Khoskheh Rud | Pa Tappeh | Paizabad | Palan-e Narges | Palan-e Olya | Palang Gerd | Palangin | Paleh Bid-e Sofla | Palek Mollah Karamineh | Palkaneh | Panjali | Parian | Pariveh-ye Olya | Pariveh-ye Sofla | Pasar | Pashkaleh-ye Olya | Pashkaleh-ye Sofla | Pashkaleh-ye Vosta | Pataq | Patiabad | Patiabad | Paunevan | Pavenar | Paweh | Payervand-e Tekyeh | Pespes | Peykulah | Pir Hayati | Pir Hayati-ye Olya | Pir Hayati-ye Sofla | Pir Hayati-ye Vosta | Pir Kashan | Pir Mikayil | Pir Mohammad | Pir Mozd | Pir Qasem | Pir Salman | Pir Sarab | Piran | Pirgeh Bar-e Simin | Piruzeh | Pol Ali Akhbar Khan | Pol Havas | Pol Mahit | Porgoli-ye Olya | Porgoli-ye Sofla | Posht Gur-e Choqa Maran | Posht Kabud-e Jahangirvand | Posht Kelan | Posht Tang-e Chenaran | Posht Tang-e Cheshmeh Qolijan | Posht Tang-e Shah Mirza | Posht Tang-e Shayengan | Posht Tappeh | Poshtaleh | Poshtang-e Gari | Posht-e Aspar Barani | Posht-e Darband | Poshteh Kash | Poshteh Rizeh-ye Sofla | Poshteh Rizeh-ye Vosta | Poshteh-ye Samavat | Post Baraq | Pukeh Abbas | Puneyeh | Puyan

=== Q ===
Qabaq Tappeh | Qader Marz | Qalaji | Qalandar-e Laki | Qalangeh | Qalanjeh | Qalayen | Qaleh Bahadri | Qaleh Dumi Zar | Qaleh Gah | Qaleh Gelineh | Qaleh Gelineh-ye Olya | Qaleh Gelineh-ye Sofla | Qaleh Jabreil | Qaleh Juq | Qaleh Kohneh | Qaleh Kuh Khosrow | Qaleh Lan | Qaleh Qazi-ye Olya | Qaleh Qazi-ye Sofla | Qaleh Rashid Aqa | Qaleh Remen | Qaleh Sefid-e Olya | Qaleh Sefid-e Sheykh Hasan | Qaleh Sefid-e Sofla | Qaleh Sorkh | Qaleh Tork-e Olya | Qaleh Tork-e Sofla | Qaleh Vari | Qaleh Zanjir-e Olya | Qaleh Zanjir-e Sofla | Qaleh Zehab | Qaleh | Qaleh-ye Asghar Khan | Qaleh-ye Bozeh Rud | Qaleh-ye Darab Khan | Qaleh-ye Deh Khanjan | Qaleh-ye Farajollah Beyg | Qaleh-ye Farhad Khan | Qaleh-ye Hajj Amin | Qaleh-ye Harasam | Qaleh-ye Khoda Morovvat | Qaleh-ye Mohammad Ali | Qaleh-ye Najaf Ali Khan | Qaleh-ye Qobad | Qaleh-ye Reza | Qaleh-ye Shian | Qaleh-ye Soleyman Khan | Qaleh-ye Zakaria | Qalicheh | Qaluh Darreh | Qalvaz | Qalvaz-e Jadid | Qap Qoli | Qapqovi | Qaqelestan | Qarah Benas | Qarah Guzlu-ye Olya | Qarah Guzlu-ye Sofla | Qarah Hasan | Qarah Tappeh | Qarah Tappeh | Qarah Vali | Qarah Veys | Qaraviz | Qareh Bolagh Sheykh Morad | Qareh Bolagh-e Azam | Qareh Qaj | Qareh Zhaleh Mahar Ali | Qarleq-e Bozorg | Qarujenag | Qasemabad | Qasemabad | Qashqeh | Qasr-e Shirin | Qazal | Qazanchi | Qazvineh | Qelateh | Qelij Khani | Qeshlaq | Qeshlaq | Qeshlaq | Qeshlaq-e Beznabad | Qeshlaq-e Daryacheh | Qeshlaq-e Hammam Darreh | Qeshlaq-e Kelid Darreh | Qeshlaq-e Olya | Qeshlaq-e Olya | Qeshlaq-e Sardar Eshraf | Qeshlaq-e Seyyed Naser | Qeshlaq-e Vosta | Qeymas | Qeysevand | Qeysevand | Qeysvand | Qeytak | Qeytasabad | Qeytul | Qeytul | Qez Qabri-ye Bahador | Qez Qabri-ye Doktor Habib | Qez Qabri-ye Ebrahim | Qez Qabri-ye Jahan Bakhsh | Qez Qabri-ye Rashid | Qezel Darreh | Qilan | Qobad | Qol Qoleh | Qolaji-ye Fatabeygi | Qoli Qoli | Qoliabad | Qolkhanchek-e Shah Tutiya | Qolqoleh | Qomam | Qoman Khoda Nazer | Qomesh | Qomeshah | Qomlijeh | Qomra Ali | Qomsheh Tappeh | Qomsheh-ye Baba Karam Khan | Qomsheh-ye Lor Zanganeh | Qomsheh-ye Seyyed Amin | Qomsheh-ye Seyyed Qasem | Qomsheh-ye Seyyed Yaqub | Qorutak | Qorveh | Qualeh Rash Vali | Quchemi | Quchi Bashi | Qukh | Qul Darreh | Qurahjil | Qurbaghestan-e Olya | Qurbaghestan-e Sofla | Quri Qaleh | Qurichai | Quti Darreh-ye Bala | Quzivand

=== R ===
Rafi | Rahimabad | Rahimabad | Rahimabad-e Olya | Rahimabad-e Sofla | Rahmanabad | Rahmatabad | Rahmatabad | Rais | Ramaki-ye Ramezan | Rashid Abbas | Rashidabad | Rashidali | Rashtian | Ravansar | Ravileh-ye Hasan | Razin | Raziyan | Reshbugar | Rezalak | Rezlansar | Riblak-e Olya | Riblak-e Sofla | Rig Jub | Rikhak-e Olya | Rikhak-e Sofla | Rikhel | Risani | Rizvand | Rizvand | Rizvand-e Ali Akbar | Rizvand-e Najaf | Robat | Rostamabad-e Bozorg | Rostamabad-e Kuchak | Rostamabad-e Rika | Ruhollah | Ruiban-e Bozorg | Ruiban-e Kuchak | Rukovan | Rutavand | Rutavand

=== S ===
Sabz Bolagh | Sadavand-e Olya | Sadeqabad | Sadval | Safaiyeh | Safar Shah | Safarabad | Safiabad | Safiabad | Sagari | Sagaz-e Mobarakabad | Sahanleh | Sahneh | Sakui Kulesah | Salarabad | Salarabad | Salarabad | Salarabad | Salatin | Saleh Kucheri | Salhakeh | Salman Tappeh | Saman Ban | Samangan | Samangan-e Olya | Samangan-e Sofla | Sameleh | Sameleh-ye Olya | Sameleh-ye Sofla | Samereh-ye Olya | Samereh-ye Sofla | Sang Dar Meydan-e Olya | Sang Dar Meydan-e Sofla | Sangchin | Sangchin-e Saleh | Sang-e Karmu Shirzadi | Sang-e Sefid | Sang-e Sefid | Sangtarash | Sanjabid-e Rayegan | Sar Ab-e Barnaj | Sar Asiab | Sar Asiab | Sar Asiab | Sar Barzah | Sar Cheqa | Sar Darreh-ye Beyglar Beygi | Sar Darreh-ye Qobadi | Sar Dashtelah | Sar Dehlaq | Sar Dowkaneh | Sar Jameh Shuran | Sar Jub | Sar Jub-e Qaleh Masgareh | Sar Kashkamir | Sar Khelaj | Sar Khom | Sar Pan | Sar Takht | Sar Takhtgah | Sar Tappeh-ye Zanganeh | Sarab Khoshkeh-ye Olya | Sarab Khoshkeh-ye Sofla | Sarab Qanbar | Sarab | Sarab | Sarab | Sarabadiyeh-ye Olya | Sarabadiyeh-ye Sofla | Sarabas | Sarab-e Baba Ali | Sarab-e Bardeh Zanjir-e Olya | Sarab-e Bardeh Zanjir-e Sofla | Sarab-e Dehlor | Sarab-e Garm Garab | Sarab-e Garm-e Olya | Sarab-e Garm-e Sofla | Sarab-e Harasam | Sarab-e Karian | Sarab-e Kulasah | Sarab-e Mileh Sar | Sarab-e Nilufar | Sarab-e Qaleh Shahin | Sarab-e Sar Firuzabad | Sarab-e Sarin | Sarab-e Shah Hoseyn | Sarab-e Shahini | Sarab-e Sheleh | Sarab-e Shian | Sarab-e Shuhan | Sarab-e Surenabad | Sarab-e Tiran | Sarab-e Zehab | Sarabeleh | Sarabian | Sarableh | Sarai | Sarailan-e Sar Qaleh | Saranjirak | Sararud-e Olya | Sararud-e Sofla | Sarasiab | Saravareh-ye Vali Najafi | Sarbagh-e Golin | Sarbekuh | Sarbor-e Jadid | Sardar | Sardarabad | Sardom | Sardsir Posht Gary | Sarhal-e Shirzadi | Sarkan | Sarkaran | Sarmaj-e Hoseynkhani | Sarmaj-e Karami | Sarmast | Sarmast | Sarmil | Sarpol-e Zahab | Sarpuzal | Sarrud-e Olya | Sarrud-e Sofla | Sarsegaz | Sartang | Sartapah | Sartipabad | Sartitan | Saru Khan | Saruran | Sarv-e Nav-e Olya | Sarv-e Nav-e Sofla | Sarzal | Sarzal-e Vali Nazeri | Sarzamelah | Satar | Satiari | Savar Beyg | Sayeh Kor-e Olya | Sayehkor-e Sofla | Saz | Sefid Ab | Sefid Barg | Sefid Choqa | Sefid Choqa | Sefid Khani | Sefid Zangul | Seh Chek | Seh Chekan-e Meleh Shahi | Seh Cheshmeh | Seh Choqa | Seh Qulan | Seh Tapan Aziz | Seh Tapan Salim | Seh Tapan | Seh Tappeh | Sekher-e Olya | Sekher-e Sofla | Selekan | Serenjageh | Seyyed Abbas | Seyyed Ayaz | Seyyed Baqer | Seyyed Mohammad | Seyyed Said | Seyyed Seyfur | Seyyed Shahab | Seyyed Shekar | Seyyed Sohrab | Seyyed Taqi Rafiqabadi | Shabankareh | Shad Bolagh | Shadabad-e Olya | Shadabad-e Sofla | Shademan | Shaghol-e Bahar Ab | Shah Bodagh | Shah Maleki | Shah Mar | Shah Vali | Shah Veysabad | Shahgodar-e Mohammad | Shahgodar-e Zamkan | Shahid Abdol Karim-e Maleki | Shahini | Shahini | Shahmar | Shahmar-e Baba Morad | Shahmar-e Mirza Morad | Shahpurabad | Shahrak-e Alzahra | Shahrak-e Bisotun | Shahrak-e Boniad | Shahrak-e Halateh | Shahrak-e Jub Baghan | Shahrak-e Meydan Namak | Shahrak-e Rijab | Shahrak-e Sarab Nilufar | Shahrak-e Sarabeleh | Shahrak-e Serias | Shahrak-e Varleh | Shahrokhabad | Shahsavan | Shalan | Shalan | Shaleh | Shaliabad | Shamsabad | Shamsek | Shamshir | Shamshir-e Darreh Rashid | Shanqal-e Khaldi | Sharaf | Sharafshah | Sharafvand | Sharifabad | Sharifabad | Sharifabad | Sharvineh | Shavil-e Sadeq Khan | Shayengan | Shelin | Shesh Bid-e Olya | Shesh Bid-e Sofla | Shesh Yekan | Sheykh Hasan | Sheykh Jabrail | Sheykh Mostafa | Sheykh Salleh | Sheykh Sorkh ol Din-e Olya | Sheykh Sorkh ol Din-e Sofla | Sheykhiabad-e Olya | Sheykhiabad-e Sofla | Shineh | Shir Khan | Shirali | Shirazi-ye Olya | Shirazi-ye Sofla | Shirazi-ye Vosta | Shireh Choqa | Shirin Ab | Shirzadabad | Shisheh Rah | Shit-e Kamarzard | Shoja | Shokrab | Shorkan | Shuhan-e Olya | Shuhan-e Sofla | Shur Bolagh | Shur Bolagh | Shurabad | Shurabad | Shuravash-e Olya | Shuravash-e Sofla | Shurcheh | Sia Sia-ye Keykhosrow | Siah Bid-e Olya | Siah Bid-e Sofla | Siah Choqa | Siah Choqa | Siah Choqai-ye Olya | Siah Choqai-ye Sofla | Siah Darreh | Siah Gol | Siah Kamar | Siah Kamar-e Olya | Siah Kamar-e Olya Maruf | Siah Kamar-e Sofla | Siah Khvor | Siah Kol | Siah Peleh-ye Olya | Siah Peleh-ye Sofla | Siah Siah | Siah Siah | Siah Siah-e Dayar | Siah Siah-ye Habib | Siah Siah-ye Khosravi | Siah Siah-ye Sheykheh | Siahkhani | Sianab-e Parab | Siaran-e Nahrab | Simani-ye Olya | Simani-ye Sofla | Simeneh-ye Olya | Simeneh-ye Sofla | Sir Kuh | Sirduleh | Sirduleh | Sivaneh Seh Tian | Sivarhovar | Siyaban | Sohbatabad | Soleymanabad | Soleymanabad | Soleymaniyeh | Soltanabad | Soltanabad | Soltaniyeh Hajjiabad | Soltankuh | Soltanqoli | Somaqestan-e Sofla | Sonqor | Sonqorabad | Sorkh Alijeh | Sorkhak | Sorkheban-e Olya | Sorkheban-e Sofla | Sorkheh Deh | Sorkheh Deh | Sorkheh Dizeh | Sorkheh Khani | Sorkheh Mehri | Sorkhehvand | Sufivand | Sufivand | Sukhvor-e Ali Mohammad-e Gol Mohammadi | Sukhvor-e Allahi | Sukhvor-e Hajji Morad | Sukhvor-e Karmi | Sukhvor-e Khush Aqbal | Sukhvor-e Kohzad | Sukhvor-e Morovvati | Sukhvor-e Namdar-e Abdi | Sukhvor-e Namdar-e Mirzapur | Sukhvor-e Rashid-e Olya | Sukhvor-e Rashid-e Sofla | Sukhvor-e Shahbaz-e Najafi | Sukhvor-e Shahbaz-e Shiri | Sumar | Suran-e Olya | Suran-e Sofla | Surenabad | Surgal | Surni-ye Olya | Surni-ye Sofla

=== T ===
Tabarabad | Taesheh Mahmud Nazari | Tahaneh-ye Olya | Tahaneh-ye Sofla | Tahaneh-ye Vosta | Tahemasab | Taherabad | Taherabad | Taherabad | Taiyafeh-ye Ali Jan | Taiyafeh-ye Babakhan | Taiyafeh-ye Hazrat-e Soleyman | Taiyafeh-ye Seyfollah | Taiyafeh-ye Shaeran | Taiyafeh-ye Shirzadi | Tajjar Akbar | Tajjar Karam-e Panahabad | Takaneh | Takht-e Shirin | Takhtgah-e Hoseyn Soltan | Takhtgah-e Jahan Bakhsh | Takhtgah-e Safi Yar Soltan | Takhtgah-e Surat Khanom | Tal Khalvati-ye Qader Rahman | Talal | Talandasht | Taleh Tut | Taleh Tut | Talkhestan | Tamark | Tamleh | Tamtam | Tang-e Esmail | Tang-e Shuhan-e Olya | Tang-e Shuhan-e Sofla | Tanur Dul | Tapani | Tappeh Afshar | Tappeh Azimeh | Tappeh Bur | Tappeh Darab Khan | Tappeh Gol | Tappeh Goleh-ye Olya | Tappeh Goleh-ye Sofla | Tappeh Kabud | Tappeh Kabud | Tappeh Kabud-e Hasan Gholami | Tappeh Kabud-e Sofla | Tappeh Kabud-e Sofla Abdol Mohammad | Tappeh Kanan | Tappeh Kuik | Tappeh Laleh | Tappeh Lari | Tappeh Lori | Tappeh Maran | Tappeh Rash Kalashi | Tappeh Rash | Tappeh Rash | Tappeh Rash | Tappeh Sabz | Tappeh Zard | Tappeh-ye Esmail | Tappeh-ye Hoseyn Khan | Tappeh-ye Khargushan | Tappeh-ye Shaban | Taq Taq | Tarazak-e Abdollah | Tarazak-e Kasan | Tarazu Bareh | Tarkeh Veys | Tashar | Tasurehjan | Tavakkolabad-e Darreh Deraz | Tavallali | Tavamen Shineh | Tavilehgah-e Olya | Tavilehgah-e Sofla | Taviran-e Olya | Taviran-e Vosta | Tayeni | Tazehabad | Tazehabad | Tazehabad | Tazehabad | Tazehabad-e Amaleh | Tazehabad-e Amin | Tazehabad-e Bani Azizi | Tazehabad-e Bati | Tazehabad-e Bidgoli | Tazehabad-e Darreh Gerd | Tazehabad-e Garaveh | Tazehabad-e Gardel Gari | Tazehabad-e Gari Khan Mohammad | Tazehabad-e Heydarbeygi | Tazehabad-e Karsavan | Tazehabad-e Kukav | Tazehabad-e Labagh | Tazehabad-e Markazi | Tazehabad-e Melleh Tarshi | Tazehabad-e Miraki | Tazehabad-e Mowlai | Tazehabad-e Murchi | Tazehabad-e Namivand | Tazehabad-e Nazliyan | Tazehabad-e Sarab | Tazehabad-e Sarab Tiran | Tazehabad-e Sarayilan | Tazehabad-e Serias | Tazehabad-e Seydali | Tazehabad-e Shir Ali | Tazehabad-e Taleqan | Tekeyeh Taviran-e Sofla | Tekyah | Telesm | Tepan | Tin | Tinemu-ye Olya | Tinemu-ye Sofla | Tisheh Kan | Tolsem Shahbaz | Torab | Torkahpan | Torkeh-ye Olya | Torkeh-ye Sofla | Torkeh-ye Sofla | Tovah Khoshkeh | Toveh Khoshkeh | Toveh Sorkhak-e Nesar | Toveh Sorkhak-e Olya | Toveh Sorkhak-e Sofla | Toveh-ye Latif | Tubreh Riz | Tukan | Tulabi | Tulak | Tumianeh | Turan Shahr | Tushmalan | Tut Shami

=== U ===
Urazeh

=== V ===
Vahdat | Valakehvand | Valiabad | Valiabad | Valikhani | Vanai | Vanakuh | Vaneh Rangineh | Vani Sar | Var Gonbad | Vara | Varavis | Vardaran | Varegah | Varegah-e Olya | Varegah-e Sofla | Vargach | Vargachgeh-ye Zeyyed Ali | Varkurak | Varleh | Varmaqan | Varmazan Somaq | Varmenjeh | Varva | Vazard Tohmasab | Vazem Khoshkeh Rud | Vazli | Veyleh | Veyleh | Veylehi-ye Melah Rash | Veys Ahmad | Vinah | Visgeh | Vizheh | Voraj | Vozmaleh | Vozmaleh

=== Y ===
Yalveh-ye Olya | Yalveh-ye Sofla | Yaran | Yargeleh | Yari | Yarijan-e Olya | Yarijan-e Sofla | Yavari Dayar | Yavari | Yek Jofti | Yekdangi | Yengijeh | Yuvan

=== Z ===
Zafaran | Zafaran-e Olya | Zafaran-e Sofla | Zaghan-e Olya | Zaghan-e Sofla | Zagheh-ye Bozorg-e Qaleh-ye Ranjbar | Zahmani | Zalakeh-ye Farajollah-e Montazeri | Zalakeh-ye Hajj Abbas Qoli | Zalakeh-ye Vaziri | Zalan | Zalan-e Olya | Zaleh Rash | Zalm Sur | Zalu Ab | Zamanabad | Zamelah | Zamkan-e Olya | Zandhar | Zaneylan-e Olya | Zaneylan-e Sofla | Zanganeh | Zangi Choqa | Zangi | Zangisheh | Zangivand | Zardab-e Mohebb | Zard-e Sheykh Hasan | Zardeh | Zardeh | Zardui | Zarrin Choqa | Zarrin Ju | Zarrin Jub | Zavareh Kuh | Zavoleh-ye Olya | Zavoleh-ye Sofla | Zazem-e Olya | Zazem-e Sofla | Zerrover | Zeyn ol Din | Zeynal Khan | Zeynalan-e Olya | Zeynalan-e Sofla | Zhalan Rashid | Zhalan Tappeh Kakeh Aziz | Zhaleh-ye Kuseh | Zhalekeh-ye Hoseyn | Ziarat-e Tamarkhan | Ziba Jub | Zilubostam | Ziran | Zirjubi | Ziveh | Zolmabad-e Olya | Zolmabad-e Sofla | Zuleh
