= Qaleh-ye Najaf Ali Khan =

Qaleh-ye Najaf Ali Khan قلعه نجفعلي خان
- Village
- Location within Iran
- Coordinates: 34°11′21″N 46°55′03″E
- Country: Iran
- Province: Kermanshah
- County: Kermanshah
- Bakhsh: Mahidasht
- Rural District: Mahidasht

Population (2006)
  - Total: 376
- Time zone: UTC+3:30 (IRST)
  - Summer (DST): UTC+4:30 (IRDT)

Qaleh-ye Najaf Ali Khan (Persian: قلعه نجفعلي خان, also Romanized as Qal‘eh-ye Najaf ‘Alī Khān) is a village in Mahidasht Rural District, Mahidasht District, Kermanshah County, Kermanshah Province, Iran. At the 2006 census, its population was 376, in 86 families.
