= Meleh Sheykh =

Village in Kermanshah, Iran

Meleh Sheykh مله شيخ
- Village
- Location within Iran
- Coordinates: 34°39′46″N 47°10′47″E
- Country: Iran
- Province: Kermanshah
- County: Kermanshah
- Bakhsh: Central
- Rural District: Poshtdarband

Population (2006)
  - Total: 261
- Time zone: UTC+3:30 (IRST)
  - Summer (DST): UTC+4:30 (IRDT)

Meleh Sheykh (Persian: مله شيخ) is a village in Poshtdarband Rural District, in the Central District of Kermanshah County, Kermanshah Province, Iran. At the 2006 census, its population was 261, in 57 families.
