= Talandasht =

Village in Kermanshah, Iran

Talandasht تالاندشت
- Village
- Location within Iran
- Coordinates: 34°02′39″N 46°55′20″E
- Country: Iran
- Province: Kermanshah
- County: Kermanshah
- Bakhsh: Firuzabad
- Rural District: Sar Firuzabad

Population (2006)
  - Total: 100
- Time zone: UTC+3:30 (IRST)
  - Summer (DST): UTC+4:30 (IRDT)

Talandasht (Persian: تالاندشت, also Romanized as Tālāndasht) is a village in Sar Firuzabad Rural District, Firuzabad District, Kermanshah County, Kermanshah Province, Iran. At the 2006 census, its population was 100, in 19 families.
