= Chorvorish =

Village in Kermanshah, Iran

Chorvorish چروريش
- Village
- Location within Iran
- Coordinates: 34°05′36″N 47°08′12″E
- Country: Iran
- Province: Kermanshah
- County: Kermanshah
- Bakhsh: Firuzabad
- Rural District: Sar Firuzabad

Population (2006)
  - Total: 21
- Time zone: UTC+3:30 (IRST)
  - Summer (DST): UTC+4:30 (IRDT)

Chorvorish (Persian: چروريش, also Romanized as Chorvorīsh; also known as Chororīsh) is a village in Sar Firuzabad Rural District, Firuzabad District, Kermanshah County, Kermanshah Province, Iran. At the 2006 census, its population was 21, in 6 families.
