= Shah Maleki =

Shah Maleki شاه ملكي
- Village
- Location within Iran
- Coordinates: 34°18′13″N 47°23′56″E
- Country: Iran
- Province: Kermanshah
- County: Kermanshah
- Bakhsh: Central
- Rural District: Dorudfaraman

Population (2006)
  - Total: 483
- Time zone: UTC+3:30 (IRST)
  - Summer (DST): UTC+4:30 (IRDT)

Shah Maleki (Persian: شاه ملكي, also Romanized as Shāh Malekī, Shāh Molkī, and Shāh Malakī; also known as Chāh Malakī and Shāh Mālīkī) is a village in Dorudfaraman Rural District, in the Central District of Kermanshah County, Kermanshah Province, Iran. At the 2006 census, its population was 483, in 101 families.
