= Mushakhan =

Mushakhan موشاخان
- Village
- Location within Iran
- Coordinates: 34°40′59″N 47°03′34″E
- Country: Iran
- Province: Kermanshah
- County: Kermanshah
- Bakhsh: Central
- Rural District: Poshtdarband

Population (2006)
  - Total: 207
- Time zone: UTC+3:30 (IRST)
  - Summer (DST): UTC+4:30 (IRDT)

Mushakhan (Persian: موشاخان, also Romanized as Mūshākhān; also known as Mūchākhānī) is a village in Poshtdarband Rural District, in the Central District of Kermanshah County, Kermanshah Province, Iran. At the 2006 census, its population was 207, in 44 families.
