= Bala Gabri =

Bala Gabri بالاگبري
- Village
- Location within Iran
- Coordinates: 34°14′34″N 47°07′27″E
- Country: Iran
- Province: Kermanshah
- County: Kermanshah
- Bakhsh: Central
- Rural District: Qarah Su

Population (2006)
  - Total: 93
- Time zone: UTC+3:30 (IRST)
  - Summer (DST): UTC+4:30 (IRDT)

Bala Gabri (Persian: بالاگبري, also Romanized as Bālā Gabrī; also known as Bālā Gīrī and Bālā Kobrá) is a village in Qarah Su Rural District, in the Central District of Kermanshah County, Kermanshah Province, Iran. At the 2006 census, its population was 93, in 20 families.
