= Huker =

Huker هوكر
- Village
- Location within Iran
- Coordinates: 34°43′33″N 47°03′53″E
- Country: Iran
- Province: Kermanshah
- County: Kermanshah
- Bakhsh: Central
- Rural District: Poshtdarband

Population (2006)
  - Total: 119
- Time zone: UTC+3:30 (IRST)
  - Summer (DST): UTC+4:30 (IRDT)

Huker (Persian: هوكر, also Romanized as Hūker and Hūkar) is a village in Poshtdarband Rural District, in the Central District of Kermanshah County, Kermanshah Province, Iran. At the 2006 census, its population was 119, in 27 families.
