= Qaqelestan =

Qaqelestan قاقلستان
- Village
- Location within Iran
- Coordinates: 34°32′41″N 46°57′18″E
- Country: Iran
- Province: Kermanshah
- County: Kermanshah
- Bakhsh: Central
- Rural District: Miyan Darband

Population (2006)
  - Total: 181
- Time zone: UTC+3:30 (IRST)
  - Summer (DST): UTC+4:30 (IRDT)

Qaqelestan (Persian: قاقلستان, also Romanized as Qāqelestān and Qāqlestān; also known as Qal‘eh-ye Qāqelestān) is a village in Miyan Darband Rural District, in the Central District of Kermanshah County, Kermanshah Province, Iran. At the 2006 census, its population was 181, in 33 families.
