= Kalkushk =

Kalkushk كل كوشك
- Village
- Location within Iran
- Coordinates: 33°59′23″N 47°11′19″E
- Country: Iran
- Province: Kermanshah
- County: Kermanshah
- Bakhsh: Firuzabad
- Rural District: Osmanvand

Population (2006)
  - Total: 41
- Time zone: UTC+3:30 (IRST)
  - Summer (DST): UTC+4:30 (IRDT)

Kalkushk (Persian: كل كوشك, also Romanized as Kalkūshk, Kalkūshak, and Kal Kūshk) is a village in Osmanvand Rural District, Firuzabad District, Kermanshah County, Kermanshah Province, Iran. At the 2006 census, its population was 41, in 10 families.
