= Deh-e Kharani =

Deh-e Kharani ده خراني
- Village
- Location within Iran
- Coordinates: 34°44′58″N 46°58′37″E
- Country: Iran
- Province: Kermanshah
- County: Kermanshah
- Bakhsh: Central
- Rural District: Razavar

Population (2006)
  - Total: 184
- Time zone: UTC+3:30 (IRST)
  - Summer (DST): UTC+4:30 (IRDT)

Deh-e Kharani (Persian: ده خراني, also Romanized as Deh-e Kharānī; also known as Kharānī) is a village in Razavar Rural District, in the Central District of Kermanshah County, Kermanshah Province, Iran. At the 2006 census, its population was 184, in 34 families.
