= Mehdiabad, Kermanshah =

Mehdiabad مهدئ اباد
- Village
- Location within Iran
- Coordinates: 34°23′53″N 46°57′15″E
- Country: Iran
- Province: Kermanshah
- County: Kermanshah
- Bakhsh: Central
- Rural District: Baladarband

Population (2006)
  - Total: 56
- Time zone: UTC+3:30 (IRST)
  - Summer (DST): UTC+4:30 (IRDT)

Mehdiabad (Persian: مهدئ اباد, also Romanized as Mehdīābād) is a village in Baladarband Rural District, in the Central District of Kermanshah County, Kermanshah Province, Iran. At the 2006 census, its population was 56, in 9 families.
