= Meserkhan =

Meserkhan مصرخان
- Village
- Location within Iran
- Coordinates: 34°31′32″N 46°55′16″E
- Country: Iran
- Province: Kermanshah
- County: Kermanshah
- Bakhsh: Central
- Rural District: Miyan Darband

Population (2006)
  - Total: 74
- Time zone: UTC+3:30 (IRST)
  - Summer (DST): UTC+4:30 (IRDT)

Meserkhan (Persian: مصرخان, also Romanized as Meşerkhān; also known as Mesterkhān) is a village in Miyan Darband Rural District, in the Central District of Kermanshah County, Kermanshah Province, Iran. At the 2006 census, its population was 74, in 16 families.
