= Sar Jameh Shuran =

Village in Kermanshah, Iran

Sar Jameh Shuran سرجامه شوران
- Village
- Location within Iran
- Coordinates: 34°08′36″N 47°17′34″E
- Country: Iran
- Province: Kermanshah
- County: Kermanshah
- Bakhsh: Central
- Rural District: Qarah Su

Population (2006)
  - Total: 67
- Time zone: UTC+3:30 (IRST)
  - Summer (DST): UTC+4:30 (IRDT)

Sar Jameh Shuran (Persian: سرجامه شوران, also Romanized as Sar Jāmeh Shūrān) is a village in Qarah Su Rural District, in the Central District of Kermanshah County, Kermanshah Province, Iran. At the 2006 census, its population was 67, in 14 families.
