= Chaqa Hoseyn =

Chaqa Hoseyn چقاحسين
- Village
- Location within Iran
- Coordinates: 34°22′54″N 46°44′12″E
- Country: Iran
- Province: Kermanshah
- County: Kermanshah
- Bakhsh: Mahidasht
- Rural District: Chaqa Narges

Population (2006)
  - Total: 106
- Time zone: UTC+3:30 (IRST)
  - Summer (DST): UTC+4:30 (IRDT)

Chaqa Hoseyn (Persian: چقاحسين, also Romanized as Chaqā Ḩoseyn and Choqā Ḩoseyn) is a village in Chaqa Narges Rural District, Mahidasht District, Kermanshah County, Kermanshah Province, Iran. At the 2006 census, its population was 106, in 28 families.
