= Galianeh-ye Ali Baqer =

Galianeh-ye Ali Baqer گليانه علي باقر
- Village
- Location within Iran
- Coordinates: 33°50′55″N 47°08′14″E
- Country: Iran
- Province: Kermanshah
- County: Kermanshah
- Bakhsh: Firuzabad
- Rural District: Jalalvand

Population (2006)
  - Total: 516
- Time zone: UTC+3:30 (IRST)
  - Summer (DST): UTC+4:30 (IRDT)

Galianeh-ye Ali Baqer (Persian: گليانه علي باقر, also Romanized as Galīāneh-ye ‘Alī Bāqer; also known as Galīāneh, Galyāneh, and Kalīāneh-ye ‘Alī Bāqer) is a village in Jalalvand Rural District, Firuzabad District, Kermanshah County, Kermanshah Province, Iran. At the 2006 census, its population was 516, in 111 families.
