= Nazargah =

Nazargah نظرگاه
- Village
- Location within Iran
- Coordinates: 34°32′27″N 46°30′05″E
- Country: Iran
- Province: Kermanshah
- County: Kermanshah
- Bakhsh: Kuzaran
- Rural District: Sanjabi

Population (2006)
  - Total: 96
- Time zone: UTC+3:30 (IRST)
  - Summer (DST): UTC+4:30 (IRDT)

Nazargah (Persian: نظرگاه, also Romanized as Naz̧argāh) is a village in Sanjabi Rural District, Kuzaran District, Kermanshah County, Kermanshah Province, Iran. At the 2006 census, its population was 96, in 17 families.
