= Qaleh-ye Darab Khan =

Qaleh-ye Darab Khan قلعه داراب خان
- Village
- Location within Iran
- Coordinates: 34°25′53″N 46°43′50″E
- Country: Iran
- Province: Kermanshah
- County: Kermanshah
- Bakhsh: Mahidasht
- Rural District: Chaqa Narges

Population (2006)
  - Total: 541
- Time zone: UTC+3:30 (IRST)
  - Summer (DST): UTC+4:30 (IRDT)

Qaleh-ye Darab Khan (Persian: قلعه داراب خان, also Romanized as Qal‘eh-ye Dārāb Khān) is a village in Chaqa Narges Rural District, Mahidasht District, Kermanshah County, Kermanshah Province, Iran. At the 2006 census, its population was 541, in 119 families.
