= Kusehvand =

Kusehvand كوسه وند
- Village
- Location within Iran
- Coordinates: 34°25′40″N 46°51′46″E
- Country: Iran
- Province: Kermanshah
- County: Kermanshah
- Bakhsh: Central
- Rural District: Baladarband

Population (2006)
  - Total: 180
- Time zone: UTC+3:30 (IRST)
  - Summer (DST): UTC+4:30 (IRDT)

Kusehvand (Persian: كوسه وند, also Romanized as Kūsehvand; also known as Kūsevand) is a village in Baladarband Rural District, in the Central District of Kermanshah County, Kermanshah Province, Iran. At the 2006 census, its population was 180, in 39 families.
