= Dur Dasht =

Dur Dasht دوردشت
- Village
- Location within Iran
- Coordinates: 33°54′48″N 47°07′36″E
- Country: Iran
- Province: Kermanshah
- County: Kermanshah
- Bakhsh: Firuzabad
- Rural District: Jalalvand

Population (2006)
  - Total: 304
- Time zone: UTC+3:30 (IRST)
  - Summer (DST): UTC+4:30 (IRDT)

Dur Dasht (Persian: دوردشت, also Romanized as Dūr Dasht) is a village in Jalalvand Rural District, Firuzabad District, Kermanshah County, Kermanshah Province, Iran. At the 2006 census, its population was 304, in 57 families.
