= Cham Nuzdeh =

Cham Nuzdeh چم نوزده
- Village
- Location within Iran
- Coordinates: 34°02′15″N 47°26′16″E
- Country: Iran
- Province: Kermanshah
- County: Kermanshah
- Bakhsh: Firuzabad
- Rural District: Sar Firuzabad

Population (2006)
  - Total: 27
- Time zone: UTC+3:30 (IRST)
  - Summer (DST): UTC+4:30 (IRDT)

Cham Nuzdeh (Persian: چم نوزده, also Romanized as Cham Nūzdeh; also known as Cham Nūzdeh-ye Olyā) is a village in Sar Firuzabad Rural District, Firuzabad District, Kermanshah County, Kermanshah Province, Iran. At the 2006 census, its population was 27, in 5 families.
