= Cheshmeh Siah =

Cheshmeh Siah چشمه سياه
- Village
- Location within Iran
- Coordinates: 34°22′34″N 46°34′43″E
- Country: Iran
- Province: Kermanshah
- County: Kermanshah
- Bakhsh: Kuzaran
- Rural District: Haft Ashiyan

Population (2006)
  - Total: 41
- Time zone: UTC+3:30 (IRST)
  - Summer (DST): UTC+4:30 (IRDT)

Cheshmeh Siah (Persian: چشمه سياه, also Romanized as Cheshmeh Sīāh) is a village in Haft Ashiyan Rural District, Kuzaran District, Kermanshah County, Kermanshah Province, Iran. At the 2006 census, its population was 41, in 13 families.
