= Nuraz =

Nuraz نوراز
- Village
- Location within Iran
- Coordinates: 33°57′04″N 47°00′21″E
- Country: Iran
- Province: Kermanshah
- County: Kermanshah
- Bakhsh: Firuzabad
- Rural District: Jalalvand

Population (2006)
  - Total: 29
- Time zone: UTC+3:30 (IRST)
  - Summer (DST): UTC+4:30 (IRDT)

Nuraz (Persian: نوراز, also Romanized as Nūrāz; also known as Nūzār) is a village in Jalalvand Rural District, Firuzabad District, Kermanshah County, Kermanshah Province, Iran. According to the 2006 census, its population was 29, in 7 families.
