= Seh Choqa =

Village in Kermanshah, Iran

Seh Choqa سه چقا
- Village
- Location within Iran
- Coordinates: 34°23′39″N 46°39′36″E
- Country: Iran
- Province: Kermanshah
- County: Kermanshah
- Bakhsh: Mahidasht
- Rural District: Chaqa Narges

Population (2006)
  - Total: 379
- Time zone: UTC+3:30 (IRST)
  - Summer (DST): UTC+4:30 (IRDT)

Seh Choqa (Persian: سه چقا, also Romanized as Seh Choqā) is a village in Chaqa Narges Rural District, Mahidasht District, Kermanshah County, Kermanshah Province, Iran. At the 2006 census, its population was 379, in 85 families.
