= Tasurehjan =

Tasurehjan تاسوره جان
- Village
- Location within Iran
- Coordinates: 34°31′49″N 46°56′10″E
- Country: Iran
- Province: Kermanshah
- County: Kermanshah
- Bakhsh: Central
- Rural District: Miyan Darband

Population (2006)
  - Total: 145
- Time zone: UTC+3:30 (IRST)
  - Summer (DST): UTC+4:30 (IRDT)

Tasurehjan (Persian: تاسوره جان, also Romanized as Tāsūrehjān; also known as Tāsūleh Jān) is a village in Miyan Darband Rural District, in the Central District of Kermanshah County, Kermanshah Province, Iran. At the 2006 census, its population was 145, in 36 families.
