= Chaqa Gonuzh =

Village in Kermanshah, Iran

Chaqa Gonuzh چقاگنوژ
- Village
- Location within Iran
- Coordinates: 34°24′54″N 46°38′34″E
- Country: Iran
- Province: Kermanshah
- County: Kermanshah
- Bakhsh: Kuzaran
- Rural District: Sanjabi

Population (2006)
  - Total: 207
- Time zone: UTC+3:30 (IRST)
  - Summer (DST): UTC+4:30 (IRDT)

Chaqa Gonuzh (Persian: چقاگنوژ, also Romanized as Chaqā Gonūzh; also known as Choqā Konūzh) is a village in Sanjabi Rural District, Kuzaran District, Kermanshah County, Kermanshah Province, Iran. At the 2006 census, its population was 207, in 45 families.
