= Toveh-ye Latif =

Village in Kermanshah, Iran

Toveh-ye Latif توه لطيف
- Village
- Location within Iran
- Coordinates: 34°17′19″N 46°57′32″E
- Country: Iran
- Province: Kermanshah
- County: Kermanshah
- Bakhsh: Mahidasht
- Rural District: Mahidasht

Population (2006)
  - Total: 288
- Time zone: UTC+3:30 (IRST)
  - Summer (DST): UTC+4:30 (IRDT)

Toveh-ye Latif (Persian: توه لطيف, also Romanized as Toveh-ye Laţīf, Tovah Latīf, Toveh-e Laţīf, and Toveh Laţīf; also known as Tua Latif) is a village in Mahidasht Rural District, Mahidasht District, Kermanshah County, Kermanshah Province, Iran. At the 2006 census, its population was 288, in 60 families.
