= Kaleh-ye Zard =

Kaleh-ye Zard كله زرد
- Village
- Location within Iran
- Coordinates: 33°50′58″N 46°59′07″E
- Country: Iran
- Province: Kermanshah
- County: Kermanshah
- Bakhsh: Firuzabad
- Rural District: Jalalvand

Population (2006)
  - Total: 24
- Time zone: UTC+3:30 (IRST)
  - Summer (DST): UTC+4:30 (IRDT)

Kaleh-ye Zard (Persian: كله زرد) is a village in Jalalvand Rural District, Firuzabad District, Kermanshah County, Kermanshah Province, Iran. At the 2006 census, its population was 24, in 8 families.
