= Darvish Beygeh =

Darvish Beygeh درويش بيگه
- Village
- Location within Iran
- Coordinates: 34°28′40″N 46°34′14″E
- Country: Iran
- Province: Kermanshah
- County: Kermanshah
- Bakhsh: Kuzaran
- Rural District: Sanjabi

Population (2006)
  - Total: 89
- Time zone: UTC+3:30 (IRST)
  - Summer (DST): UTC+4:30 (IRDT)

Darvish Beygeh (Persian: درويش بيگه, also Romanized as Darvīsh Beygeh) is a village in Sanjabi Rural District, Kuzaran District, Kermanshah County, Kermanshah Province, Iran. At the 2006 census, its population was 89, in 17 families.
