= Surgal =

Village in Kermanshah, Iran

Surgal سورگال
- Village
- Location within Iran
- Coordinates: 34°34′05″N 46°59′01″E
- Country: Iran
- Province: Kermanshah
- County: Kermanshah
- Bakhsh: Central
- Rural District: Miyan Darband

Population (2006)
  - Total: 162
- Time zone: UTC+3:30 (IRST)
  - Summer (DST): UTC+4:30 (IRDT)

Surgal (Persian: سورگال, also Romanized as Sūrgāl; also known as Sūrkāl and Sūrkān) is a village in Miyan Darband Rural District, in the Central District of Kermanshah County, Kermanshah Province, Iran. At the 2006 census, its population was 162, in 32 families.
