= Musa Naranj =

Musa Naranj موسي نارنج
- Village
- Location within Iran
- Coordinates: 34°06′30″N 47°00′28″E
- Country: Iran
- Province: Kermanshah
- County: Kermanshah
- Bakhsh: Firuzabad
- Rural District: Sar Firuzabad

Population (2006)
  - Total: 136
- Time zone: UTC+3:30 (IRST)
  - Summer (DST): UTC+4:30 (IRDT)

Musa Naranj (Persian: موسي نارنج, also Romanized as Mūsá Nāranj) is a village in Sar Firuzabad Rural District, Firuzabad District, Kermanshah County, Kermanshah Province, Iran. At the 2006 census, its population was 136, in 36 families.
