= Babaha =

Babaha باباها (باوبل)
- Village
- Location within Iran
- Coordinates: 34°25′03″N 46°35′34″E
- Country: Iran
- Province: Kermanshah
- County: Kermanshah
- Bakhsh: Kuzaran
- Rural District: Sanjabi

Population (2006)
  - Total: 82
- Time zone: UTC+3:30 (IRST)
  - Summer (DST): UTC+4:30 (IRDT)

Babaha (Persian: باباها, also Romanized as Bābāhā) is a village in Sanjabi Rural District, Kuzaran District, Kermanshah County, Kermanshah Province, Iran. At the 2006 census, its population was 82, in 21 families.
