= Chaqa Zard Baghi =

Chaqa Zard Baghi چقازردباغی
- Village
- Location within Iran
- Coordinates: 34°22′44″N 46°41′16″E
- Country: Iran
- Province: Kermanshah
- County: Kermanshah
- Bakhsh: Mahidasht
- Rural District: Chaqa Narges

Population (2006)
  - Total: 51
- Time zone: UTC+3:30 (IRST)
  - Summer (DST): UTC+4:30 (IRDT)

Chaqa Zard Baghi (Persian: چقازردباغی, also Romanized as Chaqā Zard Bāghī, Cheqā Zard-e Bāghī, and Choqā Zard-e Bāghī; also known as Cheqā Zard and Chīa Zard) is a village in Chaqa Narges Rural District, Mahidasht District, Kermanshah County, Kermanshah Province, Iran. At the 2006 census, its population was 51, in 11 families.
