= Chub Tashan =

Chub Tashan چوب تاشان
- Village
- Location within Iran
- Coordinates: 34°44′01″N 46°57′42″E
- Country: Iran
- Province: Kermanshah
- County: Kermanshah
- Bakhsh: Central
- Rural District: Razavar

Population (2006)
  - Total: 161
- Time zone: UTC+3:30 (IRST)
  - Summer (DST): UTC+4:30 (IRDT)

Chub Tashan (Persian: چوب تاشان, also romanized as Chūb Tāshān) is a village in Razavar rural District, in the bilavar District of Kermanshah County, Kermanshah Province, Iran. At the 2006 census its population was 161, in 38 families.
