= Banlarini =

Banlarini بانلريني
- Village
- Location within Iran
- Coordinates: 34°14′42″N 46°43′42″E
- Country: Iran
- Province: Kermanshah
- County: Kermanshah
- Bakhsh: Mahidasht
- Rural District: Mahidasht

Population (2006)
  - Total: 190
- Time zone: UTC+3:30 (IRST)
  - Summer (DST): UTC+4:30 (IRDT)

Banlarini (Persian: بانلريني, also Romanized as Bānlarīnī; also known as Bānlīrnī) is a village in Mahidasht Rural District, Mahidasht District, Kermanshah County, Kermanshah Province, Iran. At the 2006 census, its population was 190, in 42 families.
