= Miansarvan-e Zardalan =

Miansarvan-e Zardalan ميان سراوان زردلان
- Village
- Location within Iran
- Coordinates: 33°57′56″N 47°22′47″E
- Country: Iran
- Province: Kermanshah
- County: Kermanshah
- Bakhsh: Firuzabad
- Rural District: Sar Firuzabad

Population (2006)
  - Total: 119
- Time zone: UTC+3:30 (IRST)
  - Summer (DST): UTC+4:30 (IRDT)

Miansarvan-e Zardalan (Persian: ميان سراوان زردلان, also Romanized as Mīānsarvān-e Zardalān; also known as Mīān Sarāvān and Mīānsarvān) is a village in Sar Firuzabad Rural District, Firuzabad District, Kermanshah County, Kermanshah Province, Iran. At the 2006 census, its population was 119, in 26 families.
