= Shahrak-e Sarabeleh =

Shahrak-e Sarabeleh شهرك سرابله
- Village
- Location within Iran
- Coordinates: 34°31′59″N 47°01′32″E
- Country: Iran
- Province: Kermanshah
- County: Kermanshah
- Bakhsh: Central
- Rural District: Miyan Darband

Population (2006)
  - Total: 1,120
- Time zone: UTC+3:30 (IRST)
  - Summer (DST): UTC+4:30 (IRDT)

Shahrak-e Sarabeleh (Persian: شهرك سرابله, also Romanized as Shahrak-e Sarābeleh) is a village in Miyan Darband Rural District, in the Central District of Kermanshah County, Kermanshah Province, Iran. At the 2006 census, its population was 1,120, in 274 families.
