= Galu Darreh =

Galu Darreh گلودره
- Village
- Location within Iran
- Coordinates: 34°27′25″N 46°41′41″E
- Country: Iran
- Province: Kermanshah
- County: Kermanshah
- Bakhsh: Kuzaran
- Rural District: Sanjabi

Population (2006)
  - Total: 164
- Time zone: UTC+3:30 (IRST)
  - Summer (DST): UTC+4:30 (IRDT)

Galu Darreh (Persian: گلودره, also Romanized as Galū Darreh) is a village in Sanjabi Rural District, Kuzaran District, Kermanshah County, Kermanshah Province, Iran. At the 2006 census, its population was 164, in 36 families.
