= Markhvor =

Markhvor مارخور
- Village
- Location within Iran
- Coordinates: 33°53′29″N 47°07′40″E
- Country: Iran
- Province: Kermanshah
- County: Kermanshah
- Bakhsh: Firuzabad
- Rural District: Jalalvand

Population (2006)
  - Total: 79
- Time zone: UTC+3:30 (IRST)
  - Summer (DST): UTC+4:30 (IRDT)

Markhvor (Persian: مارخور, also Romanized as Mārkhvor; also known as Mārkhor) is a village in Jalalvand Rural District, Firuzabad District, Kermanshah County, Kermanshah Province, Iran. At the 2006 census, its population was 79, in 14 families.
