= Gandabad =

Gandabad گنداباد
- Village
- Location within Iran
- Coordinates: 34°38′46″N 47°09′31″E
- Country: Iran
- Province: Kermanshah
- County: Kermanshah
- Bakhsh: Central
- Rural District: Poshtdarband

Population (2006)
  - Total: 386
- Time zone: UTC+3:30 (IRST)
  - Summer (DST): UTC+4:30 (IRDT)

Gandabad (Persian: گنداباد, also Romanized as Gandābād) is a village in Poshtdarband Rural District, in the Central District of Kermanshah County, Kermanshah Province, Iran. At the 2006 census, its population was 386, in 114 families.
