= Do Choqa =

Do Choqa دوچقا
- Village
- Location within Iran
- Coordinates: 34°33′54″N 46°50′17″E
- Country: Iran
- Province: Kermanshah
- County: Kermanshah
- Bakhsh: Central
- Rural District: Miyan Darband

Population (2006)
  - Total: 243
- Time zone: UTC+3:30 (IRST)
  - Summer (DST): UTC+4:30 (IRDT)

Do Choqa (Persian: دوچقا, also Romanized as Do Choqā, Dow Cheqā, and Do Cheqā; also known as Do Chīān, Dow Chīān, Qal‘a Dūchīa, and Qal‘eh Dūchīa) is a village in Miyan Darband Rural District, in the Central District of Kermanshah County, Kermanshah Province, Iran. At the 2006 census, its population was 243, in 69 families.
