= Valikhani =

Vozmaleh ولیخانی
- Village
- Interactive map of Vozmaleh
- Country: Iran
- Province: Kermanshah
- County: Kermanshah
- Bakhsh: Firuzabad District
- Rural District: Sar Firuzabad Rural District

Population (2006)
  - Total: 98
- Time zone: UTC+3:30 (IRST)
  - Summer (DST): UTC+4:30 (IRDT)

Valikhani (Persian: ولیخانی) is a village in Sar Firuzabad Rural District of Firuzabad District of Kermanshah County, Kermanshah Province, Iran. At the 2006 census, its population was 98, in 26 families.
