= Rashidali =

Rashidali رشيدعلي
- Village
- Location within Iran
- Coordinates: 34°23′06″N 46°32′27″E
- Country: Iran
- Province: Kermanshah
- County: Kermanshah
- Bakhsh: Kuzaran
- Rural District: Haft Ashiyan

Population (2006)
  - Total: 131
- Time zone: UTC+3:30 (IRST)
  - Summer (DST): UTC+4:30 (IRDT)

Rashidali (Persian: رشيدعلي, also Romanized as Rashīd‘alī) is a village in Haft Ashiyan Rural District, Kuzaran District, Kermanshah County, Kermanshah Province, Iran. At the 2006 census, its population was 131, in 31 families.
