= Kavar Lavan =

Kavar Lavan كاورلوان
- Village
- Location within Iran
- Coordinates: 34°15′17″N 47°21′52″E
- Country: Iran
- Province: Kermanshah
- County: Kermanshah
- Bakhsh: Central
- Rural District: Dorudfaraman

Population (2006)
  - Total: 341
- Time zone: UTC+3:30 (IRST)
  - Summer (DST): UTC+4:30 (IRDT)

Kavar Lavan (Persian: كاورلوان, also Romanized as Kāvar Lavān; also known as Kāvareh Lavān, Kāverlāvānd, and Kāwralawān) is a village in Dorudfaraman Rural District, in the Central District of Kermanshah County, Kermanshah Province, Iran. At the 2006 census, its population was 341, in 71 families.
