= Yavari Dayar =

Yavari Dayar ياوري دايار
- Village
- Location within Iran
- Coordinates: 34°33′26″N 46°36′40″E
- Country: Iran
- Province: Kermanshah
- County: Kermanshah
- Bakhsh: Kuzaran
- Rural District: Sanjabi

Population (2006)
  - Total: 81
- Time zone: UTC+3:30 (IRST)
  - Summer (DST): UTC+4:30 (IRDT)

Yavari Dayar (Persian: ياوري دايار, also Romanized as Yāvarī Dāyār; also known as Dāyār) is a village in Sanjabi Rural District, Kuzaran District, Kermanshah County, Kermanshah Province, Iran. At the 2006 census, its population was 81, in 18 families.
