= Tappeh-ye Hoseyn Khan =

Village in Kermanshah, Iran

Tappeh-ye Hoseyn Khan تپه حسينخان
- Village
- Location within Iran
- Coordinates: 34°32′50″N 46°36′54″E
- Country: Iran
- Province: Kermanshah
- County: Kermanshah
- Bakhsh: Kuzaran
- Rural District: Sanjabi

Population (2006)
  - Total: 123
- Time zone: UTC+3:30 (IRST)
  - Summer (DST): UTC+4:30 (IRDT)

Tappeh-ye Hoseyn Khan (Persian: تپه حسينخان, also Romanized as Tappeh-ye Ḩoseyn Khān) is a village in Sanjabi Rural District, Kuzaran District, Kermanshah County, Kermanshah Province, Iran. At the 2006 census, it had a population of 123, living in 29 families.
