= Koleh Savari =

Koleh Savari كله سواري
- Village
- Location within Iran
- Coordinates: 34°24′44″N 46°42′08″E
- Country: Iran
- Province: Kermanshah
- County: Kermanshah
- Bakhsh: Mahidasht
- Rural District: Chaqa Narges

Population (2006)
  - Total: 67
- Time zone: UTC+3:30 (IRST)
  - Summer (DST): UTC+4:30 (IRDT)

Koleh Savari (Persian: كله سواري, also Romanized as Koleh Savārī) is a village in Chaqa Narges Rural District, Mahidasht District, Kermanshah County, Kermanshah Province, Iran. At the 2006 census, its population was 67, in 16 families.
