= Seyyed Taqi Rafiqabadi =

Seyyed Taqi Rafiqabadi سيدتقي رفيق ابادي
- Village
- Country: Iran
- Province: Kermanshah
- County: Kermanshah
- Bakhsh: Mahidasht
- Rural District: Mahidasht

Population (2006)
  - Total: 112
- Time zone: UTC+3:30 (IRST)
  - Summer (DST): UTC+4:30 (IRDT)

Seyyed Taqi Rafiqabadi (Persian: سيدتقي رفيق ابادي, also Romanized as Seyyed Taqī Rafīqābādī) is a village in Mahidasht Rural District, Mahidasht District, Kermanshah County, Kermanshah Province, Iran. At the 2006 census, its population was 112, in 24 families.
