= Poshtaleh =

Poshtaleh پشتاله
- Village
- Location within Iran
- Coordinates: 33°47′46″N 47°17′44″E
- Country: Iran
- Province: Kermanshah
- County: Kermanshah
- Bakhsh: Firuzabad
- Rural District: Osmanvand

Population (2006)
  - Total: 30
- Time zone: UTC+3:30 (IRST)
  - Summer (DST): UTC+4:30 (IRDT)

Poshtaleh (Persian: پشتاله, also Romanized as Poshtāleh) is a village in Osmanvand Rural District, Firuzabad District, Kermanshah County, Kermanshah Province, Iran. At the 2006 census, its population was 30, in 6 families.

== See also ==
Osmanvand Rural District
