= Choqa Qasem =

Choqa Qasem چقاقاسم
- Village
- Location within Iran
- Coordinates: 34°24′34″N 46°54′27″E
- Country: Iran
- Province: Kermanshah
- County: Kermanshah
- Bakhsh: Central
- Rural District: Baladarband

Population (2006)
  - Total: 164
- Time zone: UTC+3:30 (IRST)
  - Summer (DST): UTC+4:30 (IRDT)

Choqa Qasem (Persian: چقاقاسم, also Romanized as Choqā Qāsem) is a village in Baladarband Rural District, in the Central District of Kermanshah County, Kermanshah Province, Iran. At the 2006 census, its population was 164, in 39 families.
