= Choqa Safar =

Village in Kermanshah, Iran

Choqa Safar چقاصفر
- Village
- Location within Iran
- Coordinates: 34°15′41″N 46°45′08″E
- Country: Iran
- Province: Kermanshah
- County: Kermanshah
- Bakhsh: Mahidasht
- Rural District: Mahidasht

Population (2006)
  - Total: 236
- Time zone: UTC+3:30 (IRST)
  - Summer (DST): UTC+4:30 (IRDT)

Choqa Safar (Persian: چقاصفر, also Romanized as Choqā Şafar) is a village in Mahidasht Rural District, Mahidasht District, Kermanshah County, Kermanshah Province, Iran. At the 2006 census, its population was 236, in 52 families.
