= Sarailan-e Sar Qaleh =

Sarailan-e Sar Qaleh سرائيلان سرقلعه
- Village
- Location within Iran
- Coordinates: 33°56′58″N 47°03′36″E
- Country: Iran
- Province: Kermanshah
- County: Kermanshah
- Bakhsh: Firuzabad
- Rural District: Jalalvand

Population (2006)
  - Total: 126
- Time zone: UTC+3:30 (IRST)
  - Summer (DST): UTC+4:30 (IRDT)

Sarailan-e Sar Qaleh (Persian: سرائيلان سرقلعه, also Romanized as Sarā'īlān-e Sar Qal‘eh, Sarā’īlān Sar Qal‘eh, and Sarāylān-e Sar Qal‘eh; also known as Sarāylān) is a village in Jalalvand Rural District, Firuzabad District, Kermanshah County, Kermanshah Province, Iran. At the 2006 census, its population was 126, in 22 families.
