= Ban Ramazan =

Ban Ramazan بان رمضان
- Village
- Location within Iran
- Coordinates: 33°50′36″N 47°05′26″E
- Country: Iran
- Province: Kermanshah
- County: Kermanshah
- Bakhsh: Firuzabad
- Rural District: Jalalvand

Population (2006)
  - Total: 127
- Time zone: UTC+3:30 (IRST)
  - Summer (DST): UTC+4:30 (IRDT)

Ban Ramazan (Persian: بان رمضان, also Romanized as Bān Ramaẕān) is a village in Jalalvand Rural District, Firuzabad District, Kermanshah County, Kermanshah Province, Iran. At the 2006 census, its population was 127, in 28 families.
