= Nimdangi =

Nimdangi نيمدانگي
- Village
- Location within Iran
- Coordinates: 34°11′07″N 47°19′40″E
- Country: Iran
- Province: Kermanshah
- County: Kermanshah
- Bakhsh: Central
- Rural District: Dorudfaraman

Population (2006)
  - Total: 39
- Time zone: UTC+3:30 (IRST)
  - Summer (DST): UTC+4:30 (IRDT)

Nimdangi (Persian: نيمدانگي, also Romanized as Nīmdāngī and Nīm Dāngī) is a village in Dorudfaraman Rural District, in the Central District of Kermanshah County, Kermanshah Province, Iran. At the 2006 census, its population was 39, in 6 families.
