= Geyeh Dar =

Geyeh Dar گيه در
- Village
- Location within Iran
- Coordinates: 33°50′42″N 47°19′02″E
- Country: Iran
- Province: Kermanshah
- County: Kermanshah
- Bakhsh: Firuzabad
- Rural District: Osmanvand

Population (2006)
  - Total: 72
- Time zone: UTC+3:30 (IRST)
  - Summer (DST): UTC+4:30 (IRDT)

Geyeh Dar (Persian: گيه در; also known as Gedar) is a village in Osmanvand Rural District, Firuzabad District, Kermanshah County, Kermanshah Province, Iran. At the 2006 census, its population was 72, in 16 families.
