= Choqa Ginu =

Choqa Ginu چقاگينو
- Village
- Location within Iran
- Coordinates: 34°15′54″N 46°46′53″E
- Country: Iran
- Province: Kermanshah
- County: Kermanshah
- Bakhsh: Mahidasht
- Rural District: Mahidasht

Population (2006)
  - Total: 254
- Time zone: UTC+3:30 (IRST)
  - Summer (DST): UTC+4:30 (IRDT)

Choqa Ginu (Persian: چقاگينو, also Romanized as Choqā Gīnū) is a village in Mahidasht Rural District, Mahidasht District, Kermanshah County, Kermanshah Province, Iran. At the 2006 census, its population was 254, in 61 families.
