= Sar Dashtelah =

Sar Dashtelah سردشتله
- Village
- Location within Iran
- Coordinates: 34°11′42″N 47°16′14″E
- Country: Iran
- Province: Kermanshah
- County: Kermanshah
- Bakhsh: Central
- Rural District: Qarah Su

Population (2006)
  - Total: 43
- Time zone: UTC+3:30 (IRST)
  - Summer (DST): UTC+4:30 (IRDT)

Sar Dashtelah (Persian: سردشتله) is a village in Qarah Su Rural District, in the Central District of Kermanshah County, Kermanshah Province, Iran. At the 2006 census, its population was 43, in 10 families.
