= Sarpuzal =

Sarpuzal سرپوزل
- Village
- Location within Iran
- Coordinates: 34°07′30″N 47°03′59″E
- Country: Iran
- Province: Kermanshah
- County: Kermanshah
- Bakhsh: Firuzabad
- Rural District: Sar Firuzabad

Population (2006)
  - Total: 57
- Time zone: UTC+3:30 (IRST)
  - Summer (DST): UTC+4:30 (IRDT)

Sarpuzal (Persian: سرپوزل, also Romanized as Sarpūzal) is a village in Sar Firuzabad Rural District, Firuzabad District, Kermanshah County, Kermanshah Province, Iran. As of the 2006 census, its population was 57, in 13 families.
