= Omar Mel =

Omar Mel عمرمل
- Village
- Location within Iran
- Coordinates: 34°22′03″N 47°01′49″E
- Country: Iran
- Province: Kermanshah
- County: Kermanshah
- Bakhsh: Central
- Rural District: Baladarband

Population (2006)
  - Total: 296
- Time zone: UTC+3:30 (IRST)
  - Summer (DST): UTC+4:30 (IRDT)

Omar Mel (Persian: عمرمل, also Romanized as ‘Omar Mel) is a village in Baladarband Rural District, in the Central District of Kermanshah County, Kermanshah Province, Iran. At the 2006 census, its population was 296, in 63 families.
