= Jabbarabad-e Olya =

Jabbarabad-e Olya جبارابادعليا
- Village
- Location within Iran
- Coordinates: 34°42′09″N 47°09′28″E
- Country: Iran
- Province: Kermanshah
- County: Kermanshah
- Bakhsh: Central
- Rural District: Poshtdarband

Population (2006)
  - Total: 304
- Time zone: UTC+3:30 (IRST)
  - Summer (DST): UTC+4:30 (IRDT)

Jabbarabad-e Olya (Persian: جبارابادعليا, also Romanized as Jabbārābād-e ‘Olyā; also known as Jabbārābād-e Bālā) is a village in Poshtdarband Rural District, in the Central District of Kermanshah County, Kermanshah Province, Iran. At the 2006 census, its population was 304, in 72 families.
