= Varmenjeh =

Varmenjeh ورمنجه
- Village
- Location within Iran
- Coordinates: 34°35′43″N 46°58′10″E
- Country: Iran
- Province: Kermanshah
- County: Kermanshah
- Bakhsh: Central
- Rural District: Miyan Darband

Population (2006)
  - Total: 821
- Time zone: UTC+3:30 (IRST)
  - Summer (DST): UTC+4:30 (IRDT)

Varmenjeh (Persian: ورمنجه) is a village in Miyan Darband Rural District, in the Central District of Kermanshah County, Kermanshah Province, Iran. At the 2006 census, its population was 821, in 195 families.
