= Khaneh Beygi =

Khaneh Beygi خانه بيگي
- Village
- Location within Iran
- Coordinates: 34°19′06″N 46°41′14″E
- Country: Iran
- Province: Kermanshah
- County: Kermanshah
- Bakhsh: Mahidasht
- Rural District: Chaqa Narges

Population (2006)
  - Total: 60
- Time zone: UTC+3:30 (IRST)
  - Summer (DST): UTC+4:30 (IRDT)

Khaneh Beygi (Persian: خانه بيگي, also Romanized as Khāneh Beygī; also known as Khāneh Begī) is a village in Chaqa Narges Rural District, Mahidasht District, Kermanshah County, Kermanshah Province, Iran. At the 2006 census, its population was 60, in 14 families.
