= Bagh-e Karambeyg =

Bagh-e Karambeyg باغ كرم بيگ
- Village
- Location within Iran
- Coordinates: 34°02′58″N 47°11′17″E
- Country: Iran
- Province: Kermanshah
- County: Kermanshah
- Bakhsh: Firuzabad
- Rural District: Sar Firuzabad

Population (2006)
  - Total: 201
- Time zone: UTC+3:30 (IRST)
  - Summer (DST): UTC+4:30 (IRDT)

Bagh-e Karambeyg (Persian: باغ كرم بيگ, also Romanized as Bāgh-e Karambeyg; also known as Bāqrāmbek) is a village in Sar Firuzabad Rural District, Firuzabad District, Kermanshah County, Kermanshah Province, Iran. At the 2006 census, its population was 201, in 42 families.
