= Reshbugar =

Reshbugar رشبوگر
- Village
- Location within Iran
- Coordinates: 34°10′06″N 46°56′43″E
- Country: Iran
- Province: Kermanshah
- County: Kermanshah
- Bakhsh: Mahidasht
- Rural District: Mahidasht

Population (2006)
  - Total: 175
- Time zone: UTC+3:30 (IRST)
  - Summer (DST): UTC+4:30 (IRDT)

Reshbugar (Persian: رشبوگر, also Romanized as Reshbūgar) is a village in Mahidasht Rural District, Mahidasht District, Kermanshah County, Kermanshah Province, Iran. At the 2006 census, its population was 175, in 51 families.
