= Karnachi =

Karnachi كرناچي
- Neighbourhood
- Location within Iran
- Coordinates: 34°23′03″N 47°04′11″E
- Country: Iran
- Province: Kermanshah
- County: Kermanshah
- Bakhsh: Central

Population (2006)
  - Total: 4,644
- Time zone: UTC+3:30 (IRST)

Karnachi (Persian: كرناچي, also Romanized as Karnāchī; also known as Karnājī) is a Neighbourhood in Kermanshah, Iran. It was a village in Miyan Darband Rural District, in the Central District of Kermanshah County, Kermanshah Province. In 2012, this village, along with several other villages, was annexed to the urban area of Kermanshah and became one of the neighborhoods of that city. At the 2006 census, its population was 4,644, in 1,117 families.
