= Sagari =

Sagari سگري
- Village
- Location within Iran
- Coordinates: 33°54′22″N 47°04′21″E
- Country: Iran
- Province: Kermanshah
- County: Kermanshah
- Bakhsh: Firuzabad
- Rural District: Jalalvand

Population (2006)
  - Total: 24
- Time zone: UTC+3:30 (IRST)
  - Summer (DST): IRDT

Sagari (Persian: سگري, also Romanized as Sagarī) is a village in Jalalvand Rural District, Firuzabad District, Kermanshah County, Kermanshah Province, Iran. At the 2006 census, its population was 24, in six families.
