= Qaleh-ye Soleyman Khan =

Qaleh-ye Soleyman Khan قلعه سليمان خان
- Village
- Location within Iran
- Coordinates: 34°30′59″N 46°31′35″E
- Country: Iran
- Province: Kermanshah
- County: Kermanshah
- Bakhsh: Kuzaran
- Rural District: Sanjabi

Population (2006)
  - Total: 120
- Time zone: UTC+3:30 (IRST)
  - Summer (DST): UTC+4:30 (IRDT)

Qaleh-ye Soleyman Khan (Persian: قلعه سليمان خان, also Romanized as Qal‘eh-ye Soleymān Khān) is a village in Sanjabi Rural District, Kuzaran District, Kermanshah County, Kermanshah Province, Iran. At the 2006 census, its population was 120, in 21 families.
