= Dayar-e Assad Khan =

Dayar-e Assad Khan داياراسدخان
- Village
- Country: Iran
- Province: Kermanshah
- County: Kermanshah
- Bakhsh: Kuzaran
- Rural District: Sanjabi

Population (2006)
  - Total: 68
- Time zone: UTC+3:30 (IRST)
  - Summer (DST): UTC+4:30 (IRDT)

Dayar-e Assad Khan (Persian: داياراسدخان, also Romanized as Dāyār-e Assad Khān) is a village in Sanjabi Rural District, Kuzaran District, Kermanshah County, Kermanshah Province, Iran. At the 2006 census, its population was 68, in 15 families.
