= Khaneh Khoda =

Khaneh-ye Khoda خانه خدا
- Village
- Location within Iran
- Coordinates: 34°30′08″N 47°04′15″E
- Country: Iran
- Province: Kermanshah
- County: Kermanshah
- Bakhsh: Central
- Rural District: Miyan Darband

Population (2006)
  - Total: 121
- Time zone: UTC+3:30 (IRST)
  - Summer (DST): UTC+4:30 (IRDT)

Khaneh-ye Khoda (Persian: خانه خدا, also Romanized as Khāneh-ye Khodā) is a village in Miyan Darband Rural District, in the Central District of Kermanshah County, Kermanshah Province, Iran. At the 2006 census, its population was 121, in 28 families.
