= Qaleh-ye Asghar Khan =

Qaleh-ye Asghar Khan قلعه اصغرخان
- Village
- Location within Iran
- Coordinates: 34°32′35″N 46°36′34″E
- Country: Iran
- Province: Kermanshah
- County: Kermanshah
- Bakhsh: Kuzaran
- Rural District: Sanjabi

Population (2006)
  - Total: 28
- Time zone: UTC+3:30 (IRST)
  - Summer (DST): UTC+4:30 (IRDT)

Qaleh-ye Asghar Khan (Persian: قلعه اصغرخان, also Romanized as Qal‘eh-ye Aşghar Khān) is a village in Sanjabi Rural District, Kuzaran District, Kermanshah County, Kermanshah Province, Iran. At the 2006 census, its population was 28, in 7 families.
