= Beleh Kabud =

Beleh Kabud بله كبود
- Village
- Location within Iran
- Coordinates: 34°27′35″N 46°57′54″E
- Country: Iran
- Province: Kermanshah
- County: Kermanshah
- Bakhsh: Central
- Rural District: Miyan Darband

Population (2006)
  - Total: 64
- Time zone: UTC+3:30 (IRST)
  - Summer (DST): UTC+4:30 (IRDT)

Beleh Kabud (Persian: بله كبود, also Romanized as Beleh Kabūd, Baleh Kabood, and Baleh Kabūd; also known as Balla Kabūd, Bālā Kabūd, and Bol Kabūd) is a village in Miyan Darband Rural District, in the Central District of Kermanshah County, Kermanshah Province, Iran. At the 2006 census, its population was 64, in 19 families.
