= Deh-e Kharan =

Deh-e Kharan ده خران
- Village
- Location within Iran
- Coordinates: 34°44′56″N 46°58′41″E
- Country: Iran
- Province: Kermanshah
- County: Kermanshah
- Bakhsh: Central
- Rural District: Poshtdarband

Population (2006)
  - Total: 337
- Time zone: UTC+3:30 (IRST)
  - Summer (DST): UTC+4:30 (IRDT)

Deh-e Kharan (Persian: ده خران, also Romanized as Deh-e Kharān; also known as Deh-e Kharānī) is a village in Poshtdarband Rural District, in the Central District of Kermanshah County, Kermanshah Province, Iran. At the 2006 census, the population was 337, in 75 families.
