= Gush Boran =

Gush Boran گوشبران
- Village
- Location within Iran
- Coordinates: 34°14′54″N 47°08′47″E
- Country: Iran
- Province: Kermanshah
- County: Kermanshah
- Bakhsh: Central
- Rural District: Qarah Su

Population (2006)
  - Total: 180
- Time zone: UTC+3:30 (IRST)
  - Summer (DST): UTC+4:30 (IRDT)

Gush Boran (Persian: گوشبران, also Romanized as Gūsh Borān and Gūshborān) is a village in Qarah Su Rural District, in the Central District of Kermanshah County, Kermanshah Province, Iran. At the 2006 census, its population was 180, in 37 families.
