= Payervand-e Tekyeh =

Payervand-e Tekyeh پايروندتكيه
- Village
- Location within Iran
- Coordinates: 34°13′31″N 47°21′33″E
- Country: Iran
- Province: Kermanshah
- County: Kermanshah
- Bakhsh: Central
- Rural District: Dorudfaraman

Population (2006)
  - Total: 24
- Time zone: UTC+3:30 (IRST)
  - Summer (DST): UTC+4:30 (IRDT)

Payervand-e Tekyeh (Persian: پايروندتكيه, also Romanized as Pāyervand-e Tekyeh; also known as Bāyervand) is a village in Dorudfaraman Rural District, in the Central District of Kermanshah County, Kermanshah Province, Iran. At the 2006 census, its population was 24, in 6 families.
