= Hajji Aziz-e Cheshmeh Sefid =

Hajji Aziz-e Cheshmeh Sefid حاجي عزيز چشمه سفيد
- Village
- Location within Iran
- Coordinates: 34°17′24″N 47°00′39″E
- Country: Iran
- Province: Kermanshah
- County: Kermanshah
- Bakhsh: Mahidasht
- Rural District: Mahidasht

Population (2006)
  - Total: 225
- Time zone: UTC+3:30 (IRST)
  - Summer (DST): UTC+4:30 (IRDT)

Hajji Aziz-e Cheshmeh Sefid (Persian: حاجي عزيز چشمه سفيد, also Romanized as Ḩājjī ʿAzīz-e Cheshmeh Sefīd; also known as Ḩājīazīz) is a village in Mahidasht Rural District, Mahidasht District, Kermanshah County, Kermanshah Province, Iran. At the 2006 census, its population was 225, in 52 families.
