= Gamizaj-e Olya =

Village in Kermanshah, Iran

Gamizaj-e Olya گاميزج عليا
- Village
- Location within Iran
- Coordinates: 34°08′09″N 47°02′43″E
- Country: Iran
- Province: Kermanshah
- County: Kermanshah
- Bakhsh: Firuzabad
- Rural District: Sar Firuzabad

Population (2006)
  - Total: 275
- Time zone: UTC+3:30 (IRST)
  - Summer (DST): UTC+4:30 (IRDT)

Gamizaj-e Olya (Persian: گاميزج عليا, also Romanized as Gāmīzaj-e ‘Olya and Gāmīzej-e ‘Olyā; also known as Gāmizaj, Gāmīzaj-e Bālā, Gamīzej-e Bālā, and Garmizak) is a village in Sar Firuzabad Rural District, Firuzabad District, Kermanshah County, Kermanshah Province, Iran. At the 2006 census, its population was 275, in 48 families.
