= Laleh Bag =

Laleh Bag لاله بگ
- Village
- Location within Iran
- Coordinates: 33°51′09″N 47°05′03″E
- Country: Iran
- Province: Kermanshah
- County: Kermanshah
- Bakhsh: Firuzabad
- Rural District: Jalalvand

Population (2006)
  - Total: 34
- Time zone: UTC+3:30 (IRST)
  - Summer (DST): UTC+4:30 (IRDT)

Laleh Bag (Persian: لاله بگ, also Romanized as Lāleh Beg) is a village in Jalalvand Rural District, Firuzabad District, Kermanshah County, Kermanshah Province, Iran. At the 2006 census, its population was 34, in 6 families.
