= Fakhriabad =

Fakhriabad فخري اباد
- Village
- Location within Iran
- Coordinates: 34°30′45″N 46°41′54″E
- Country: Iran
- Province: Kermanshah
- County: Kermanshah
- Bakhsh: Kuzaran
- Rural District: Sanjabi

Population (2006)
  - Total: 158
- Time zone: UTC+3:30 (IRST)
  - Summer (DST): UTC+4:30 (IRDT)

Fakhriabad (Persian: فخري اباد, also romanized as Fakhrīābād) is a village in Sanjabi Rural District, Kuzaran District, Kermanshah County, Kermanshah Province, Iran. At the 2006 census, its population was 158, in 39 families.
