= Choqa-ye Sefid =

Choqa-ye Sefid چقاسفيد
- Village
- Location within Iran
- Coordinates: 34°27′00″N 46°53′35″E
- Country: Iran
- Province: Kermanshah
- County: Kermanshah
- Bakhsh: Central
- Rural District: Baladarband

Population (2006)
  - Total: 36
- Time zone: UTC+3:30 (IRST)
  - Summer (DST): UTC+4:30 (IRDT)

Choqa-ye Sefid (Persian: چقاسفيد, also Romanized as Choqā-ye Sefīd) is a village in Baladarband Rural District, in the Central District of Kermanshah County, Kermanshah Province, Iran. At the 2006 census, its population was 36, in 7 families.
