= Qeymas =

Village in Kermanshah, Iran

Qeymas قيماس
- Village
- Location within Iran
- Coordinates: 34°10′24″N 46°57′42″E
- Country: Iran
- Province: Kermanshah
- County: Kermanshah
- Bakhsh: Mahidasht
- Rural District: Mahidasht

Population (2006)
  - Total: 134
- Time zone: UTC+3:30 (IRST)
  - Summer (DST): UTC+4:30 (IRDT)

Qeymas (Persian: قيماس, also Romanized as Qeymās; also known as Kainas and Kāynas) is a village in Mahidasht Rural District, Mahidasht District, Kermanshah County, Kermanshah Province, Iran. At the 2006 census, its population was 134, in 36 families.
