= Seyyed Seyfur =

Seyyed Seyfur سيدصيفور
- Village
- Location within Iran
- Coordinates: 34°27′16″N 46°30′10″E
- Country: Iran
- Province: Kermanshah
- County: Kermanshah
- Bakhsh: Kuzaran
- Rural District: Sanjabi

Population (2006)
  - Total: 23
- Time zone: UTC+3:30 (IRST)
  - Summer (DST): UTC+4:30 (IRDT)

Seyyed Seyfur (Persian: سيدصيفور, also Romanized as Seyyed Seyfūr and Seyyed Şeyfūr) is a village in Sanjabi Rural District, Kuzaran District, Kermanshah County, Kermanshah Province, Iran. At the 2006 census, its population was 23, in 5 families.
