= Bi Abr-e Choqamaran =

Bi Abr-e Choqamaran بي ابرچقاماران
- Village
- Location within Iran
- Coordinates: 34°39′29″N 46°51′01″E
- Country: Iran
- Province: Kermanshah
- County: Kermanshah
- Bakhsh: Central
- Rural District: Miyan Darband

Population (2006)
  - Total: 574
- Time zone: UTC+3:30 (IRST)
  - Summer (DST): UTC+4:30 (IRDT)

Bi Abr-e Choqamaran (Persian: بي ابرچقاماران, also Romanized as Bī Abr-e Choqāmārān; also known as Bī Abr) is a village in Miyan Darband Rural District, in the Central District of Kermanshah County, Kermanshah Province, Iran. At the 2006 census, its population was 574, in 125 families.
