= Varmazan Somaq =

Village in Kermanshah, Iran

Varmazan Somaq ورمزان سماق
- Village
- Location within Iran
- Coordinates: 34°43′36″N 47°08′35″E
- Country: Iran
- Province: Kermanshah
- County: Kermanshah
- Bakhsh: Central
- Rural District: Poshtdarband

Population (2006)
  - Total: 680
- Time zone: UTC+3:30 (IRST)
  - Summer (DST): UTC+4:30 (IRDT)

Varmazan Somaq or Varmazān Somāq (Persian: ورمزان سماق), also known as simply Somāq, Sumāq, and Varmazān, is a village in Poshtdarband Rural District, in the Central District of Kermanshah County, Kermanshah Province, Iran. At the 2006 census, its population was 680, in 167 families.
