= Amid Ali Qasemi =

Amid Ali Qasemi اميدعلي قاسمي
- Village
- Country: Iran
- Province: Kermanshah
- County: Kermanshah
- Bakhsh: Firuzabad
- Rural District: Sar Firuzabad

Population (2006)
  - Total: 80
- Time zone: UTC+3:30 (IRST)
  - Summer (DST): UTC+4:30 (IRDT)

Amid Ali Qasemi (Persian: اميدعلي قاسمي, also Romanized as Amīd ʿAlī Qāsemī) is a village in Sar Firuzabad Rural District, Firuzabad District, Kermanshah County, Kermanshah Province, Iran. At the 2006 census, its population was 80, in 14 families.
