= Faryadras =

Faryadras فريادرس
- Village
- Location within Iran
- Coordinates: 33°57′59″N 47°00′22″E
- Country: Iran
- Province: Kermanshah
- County: Kermanshah
- Bakhsh: Firuzabad
- Rural District: Jalalvand

Population (2006)
  - Total: 32
- Time zone: UTC+3:30 (IRST)
  - Summer (DST): UTC+4:30 (IRDT)

Faryadras (Persian: فريادرس, also Romanized as Faryādras) is a village in Jalalvand Rural District, Firuzabad District, Kermanshah County, Kermanshah Province, Iran. At the 2006 census, its population was 32, in 6 families.
