= Serenjageh =

Serenjageh سرنجگه
- Village
- Location within Iran
- Coordinates: 34°40′21″N 47°09′26″E
- Country: Iran
- Province: Kermanshah
- County: Kermanshah
- Bakhsh: Central
- Rural District: Poshtdarband

Population (2006)
  - Total: 173
- Time zone: UTC+3:30 (IRST)
  - Summer (DST): UTC+4:30 (IRDT)

Serenjageh (Persian: سرنجگه) is a village in Poshtdarband Rural District, in the Central District of Kermanshah County, Kermanshah Province, Iran. At the 2006 census, its population was 173 across 38 families.
