= Kurpeh =

Kurpeh كورپه
- Village
- Location within Iran
- Coordinates: 34°25′25″N 46°30′22″E
- Country: Iran
- Province: Kermanshah
- County: Kermanshah
- Bakhsh: Kuzaran
- Rural District: Sanjabi

Population (2006)
  - Total: 39
- Time zone: UTC+3:30 (IRST)
  - Summer (DST): UTC+4:30 (IRDT)

Kurpeh (Persian: كورپه, also Romanized as Kūrpeh) is a village in Iran, located in Sanjabi Rural District, Kuzaran District, Kermanshah County, Kermanshah Province. At the 2006 census, its population was 39, in 9 families.
