= Saruran =

Saruran سروران
- Village
- Location within Iran
- Coordinates: 34°36′06″N 46°54′23″E
- Country: Iran
- Province: Kermanshah
- County: Kermanshah
- Bakhsh: Central
- Rural District: Miyan Darband

Population (2006)
  - Total: 111
- Time zone: UTC+3:30 (IRST)
  - Summer (DST): UTC+4:30 (IRDT)

Saruran (Persian: سروران, also Romanized as Sarūrān) is a village in Miyan Darband Rural District, in the Central District of Kermanshah County, Kermanshah Province, Iran. At the 2006 census, its population was 111, in 22 families.
