= Mast Ali-ye Sofla =

Mast Ali-ye Sofla مستعلی سفلی
- Village
- Location within Iran
- Coordinates: 33°58′56″N 47°06′18″E
- Country: Iran
- Province: Kermanshah
- County: Kermanshah
- Bakhsh: Firuzabad
- Rural District: Osmanvand

Population (2006)
  - Total: 46
- Time zone: UTC+3:30 (IRST)
  - Summer (DST): UTC+4:30 (IRDT)

Mast Ali-ye Sofla (Persian: مستعلی سفلی, also Romanized as Mast ‘Alī-ye Soflá) is a village in Osmanvand Rural District, Firuzabad District, Kermanshah County, Kermanshah Province, Iran. At the 2006 census, its population was 46, in 11 families.
