= Pir Mozd =

Pir Mozd پيرمزد
- Village
- Location within Iran
- Coordinates: 34°39′40″N 46°53′16″E
- Country: Iran
- Province: Kermanshah
- County: Kermanshah
- Bakhsh: Central
- Rural District: Razavar

Population (2006)
  - Total: 75
- Time zone: UTC+3:30 (IRST)
  - Summer (DST): UTC+4:30 (IRDT)

Pir Mozd (Persian: پيرمزد, also Romanized as Pīr Mozd) is a village in Razavar Rural District, in the Central District of Kermanshah County, Kermanshah Province, Iran. At the 2006 census, its population was 75, in 16 families.
