= Dust Vand =

Dust Vand دوستوند
- Village
- Location within Iran
- Coordinates: 34°21′59″N 47°00′43″E
- Country: Iran
- Province: Kermanshah
- County: Kermanshah
- Bakhsh: Central
- Rural District: Baladarband

Population (2006)
  - Total: 298
- Time zone: UTC+3:30 (IRST)
  - Summer (DST): UTC+4:30 (IRDT)

Dust Vand (Persian: دوستوند, also Romanized as Dūst Vand and Dūstvand) is a village in Baladarband Rural District, in the Central District of Kermanshah County, Kermanshah Province, Iran. At the 2006 census, its population was 298, in 69 families.
