= Zangi Choqa =

Zangi Choqa زنگي چقا
- Village
- Location within Iran
- Coordinates: 34°17′12″N 47°24′46″E
- Country: Iran
- Province: Kermanshah
- County: Kermanshah
- Bakhsh: Central
- Rural District: Dorudfaraman

Population (2006)
  - Total: 243
- Time zone: UTC+3:30 (IRST)
  - Summer (DST): UTC+4:30 (IRDT)

Zangi Choqa (Persian: زنگي چقا, also Romanized as Zangī Choqā) is a village in Dorudfaraman Rural District, in the Central District of Kermanshah County, Kermanshah Province, Iran. At the 2006 census, its population was 243, in 48 families.
