= Gowharabad, Kermanshah =

Gowharabad گوهراباد
- Village
- Location within Iran
- Coordinates: 34°16′08″N 46°41′08″E
- Country: Iran
- Province: Kermanshah
- County: Kermanshah
- Bakhsh: Mahidasht
- Rural District: Chaqa Narges

Population (2006)
  - Total: 330
- Time zone: UTC+3:30 (IRST)
  - Summer (DST): UTC+4:30 (IRDT)

Gowharabad (Persian: گوهراباد, also Romanized as Gowharābād) is a village in Chaqa Narges Rural District, Mahidasht District, Kermanshah County, Kermanshah Province, Iran. At the 2006 census, its population was 330, in 65 families.
