= Chavoshan =

Village in Kermanshah, Iran

Chavoshan چاوشان
- Village
- Location within Iran
- Coordinates: 34°18′55″N 46°59′12″E
- Country: Iran
- Province: Kermanshah
- County: Kermanshah
- Bakhsh: Mahidasht
- Rural District: Mahidasht

Population (2006)
  - Total: 80
- Time zone: UTC+3:30 (IRST)
  - Summer (DST): UTC+4:30 (IRDT)

Chavoshan (Persian: چاوشان, also Romanized as Chāvoshān) is a village in Mahidasht Rural District, Mahidasht District, Kermanshah County, Kermanshah Province, Iran. At the 2006 census, its population was 80, in 21 families.
