= Deh Pir =

Village in Kermanshah, Iran

Deh Pir ده پير
- Village
- Location in Iran
- Coordinates: 34°18′51″N 46°41′43″E
- Country: Iran
- Province: Kermanshah
- County: Kermanshah
- Bakhsh: Mahidasht
- Rural District: Chaqa Narges

Population (2006)
  - Total: 158
- Time zone: UTC+3:30 (IRST)
  - Summer (DST): UTC+4:30 (IRDT)

Deh Pir (Persian: ده پير, also Romanized as Deh Pīr) is a village in Chaqa Narges Rural District, Mahidasht District, Kermanshah County, Kermanshah Province, Iran. At the 2006 census, its population was 158, in 34 families.
