= Mirakeh-ye Qaleh Qazi =

Mirakeh-ye Qaleh Qazi ميركه قلعه قاضي
- Village
- Location within Iran
- Coordinates: 34°23′19″N 46°30′53″E
- Country: Iran
- Province: Kermanshah
- County: Kermanshah
- Bakhsh: Kuzaran
- Rural District: Haft Ashiyan

Population (2006)
  - Total: 170
- Time zone: UTC+3:30 (IRST)
  - Summer (DST): UTC+4:30 (IRDT)

Mirakeh-ye Qaleh Qazi (Persian: ميركه قلعه قاضي, also Romanized as Mīrakeh-ye Qal‘eh Qāẕī; also known as Mīrageh-ye Qal‘eh Qāẕī and Mīrakeh) is a village in Haft Ashiyan Rural District, Kuzaran District, Kermanshah County, Kermanshah Province, Iran. At the 2006 census, its population was 170, in 39 families.
