= Choqa Kalbali =

Village in Kermanshah, Iran

Choqa Kalbali چقاكلب علي
- Village
- Location within Iran
- Coordinates: 34°15′58″N 46°44′08″E
- Country: Iran
- Province: Kermanshah
- County: Kermanshah
- Bakhsh: Mahidasht
- Rural District: Mahidasht

Population (2006)
  - Total: 339
- Time zone: UTC+3:30 (IRST)
  - Summer (DST): UTC+4:30 (IRDT)

Choqa Kalbali (Persian: چقاكلب علي, also Romanized as Choqā Kalb‘alī and Chaqā Kalbe‘alī) is a village in Mahidasht Rural District, Mahidasht District, Kermanshah County, Kermanshah province, Iran. At the 2006 census, its population was 339, in 70 families.
