= Kharagab-e Olya =

Kharagab-e Olya خرگ اب عليا
- Village
- Location within Iran
- Coordinates: 34°07′56″N 47°02′17″E
- Country: Iran
- Province: Kermanshah
- County: Kermanshah
- Bakhsh: Firuzabad
- Rural District: Sar Firuzabad

Population (2006)
  - Total: 74
- Time zone: UTC+3:30 (IRST)
  - Summer (DST): UTC+4:30 (IRDT)

Kharagab-e Olya (Persian: خرگ اب عليا, also Romanized as Kharagāb-e ‘Olyā; also known as Kharakāb-e ‘Olyā) is a village in Sar Firuzabad Rural District, Firuzabad District, Kermanshah County, Kermanshah Province, Iran. At the 2006 census, its population was 74, in 14 families.
