= Malek Khatabi =

Malek Khatabi ملك خطابي
- Village
- Location within Iran
- Coordinates: 34°24′55″N 46°52′34″E
- Country: Iran
- Province: Kermanshah
- County: Kermanshah
- Bakhsh: Central
- Rural District: Baladarband

Population (2006)
  - Total: 233
- Time zone: UTC+3:30 (IRST)
  - Summer (DST): UTC+4:30 (IRDT)

Malek Khatabi (Persian: ملك خطابي, also Romanized as Malek Khaţābī) is a village in Baladarband Rural District, in the Central District of Kermanshah County, Kermanshah Province, Iran. At the 2006 census, its population was 233, in 53 families.
