= Choqa Khazan =

Choqa Khazan چقاخزان
- Village
- Location within Iran
- Coordinates: 34°31′56″N 46°36′36″E
- Country: Iran
- Province: Kermanshah
- County: Kermanshah
- Bakhsh: Kuzaran
- Rural District: Sanjabi

Population (2006)
  - Total: 240
- Time zone: UTC+3:30 (IRST)
  - Summer (DST): UTC+4:30 (IRDT)

Choqa Khazan (Persian: چقاخزان, also Romanized as Choqā Khazān; also known as Choqā Qazān) is a village in Sanjabi Rural District, Kuzaran District, Kermanshah County, Kermanshah Province, Iran. At the 2006 census, its population was 240, in 54 families.
