= Qapqovi =

Qapqovi قاپقوي
- Village
- Location within Iran
- Coordinates: 33°57′00″N 46°57′00″E
- Country: Iran
- Province: Kermanshah
- County: Kermanshah
- Bakhsh: Firuzabad
- Rural District: Jalalvand

Population (2006)
  - Total: 270
- Time zone: UTC+3:30 (IRST)
  - Summer (DST): UTC+4:30 (IRDT)

Qapqovi (Persian: قاپقوي, also Romanized as Qāpqovī) is a village in Jalalvand Rural District, Firuzabad District, Kermanshah County, Kermanshah Province, Iran. At the 2006 census, its population was 270, in 61 families.
