= Jahangirvand =

Jahangirvand جهانگيروند
- Village
- Location within Iran
- Coordinates: 33°58′08″N 47°14′17″E
- Country: Iran
- Province: Kermanshah
- County: Kermanshah
- Bakhsh: Firuzabad
- Rural District: Osmanvand

Population (2006)
  - Total: 257
- Time zone: UTC+3:30 (IRST)
  - Summer (DST): UTC+4:30 (IRDT)

Jahangirvand (Persian: جهانگيروند, also Romanized as Jahāngīrvand) is a village in Osmanvand Rural District, Firuzabad District, Kermanshah County, Kermanshah Province, Iran. At the 2006 census, its population was 257, in 52 families.
