= Domab, Isfahan =

Village in Isfahan province, Iran

Domab Persian: دماب
- Village
- Location within Iran
- Coordinates: 33°07′16″N 50°42′54″E
- Country: Iran
- Province: Isfahan
- County: Najafabad
- District: Mehrdasht
- Rural District: Eshen

Population (2016)
  - Total: 521
- Time zone: UTC+3:30 (IRST)

Domab (Persian: دماب) (Note: Also romanized as Domāb; also known as Dumāb) is a village in Eshen Rural District (Note: Formerly Arabestan-e Olya Rural District) of Mehrdasht District in Najafabad County, Isfahan province, Iran.

Domab is located between the three cities of Khvansar, Najafabad and Golpayegan. Domab is approximately 2140 meters above sea level. Located on the southern slope of Dalan mountain, Domab is irrigated via seasonal rivers. Choghagodar is also nearby.

The village contains a museum with 200 artifacts, a library, computer center and film center. There is also a cultural house in the village.

== History ==
Domab was referred to as Sabz Darreh Morad Abad in ancient documents. In those times, the settlement of Moradabad was most likely the nearest settlement to the Domab area. The cleaning of the Domab aqueduct led to the discovery of a stone lamp with Ostad Sha’Ban 1112 engraved on it.

It is assumed that Domab became a permanent settlement between the years 1100 and 1150 A.D. The founders of the village are thought to be two brothers, named Moheb and Saleh, who began the families of Mohebian and Salehian. The farm at Domab and its surrounding region were at first rented from Dehagh.

After World War II, inflation became a problem in the region, and quarrels broke out between Domab and neighboring settlements of Eshen, Rahmatabad, and Khundab. There was also agricultural rioting, recorded in the village historical register.

Haj Hassan Domabi, said to be the son of Moheb, led the settlers of Domab to purchase the land from Dehagh. They registered the settlement as a village in the division of Isfahan.

Haj Hassan implemented the construction of foundation plans for the settlement, a local bath, and a mosque. Eventually, for the establishment of security in the region, a large castle was constructed, presumed to be the largest castle in the region. Although smaller castles had existed prior to this one, the new castle provided additional security against highwaymen and plunderers.

A few decades after this, there were internal problems in the village, due to arguments between the Mirzabi tribe and the Mohebi tribe. Externally, there were issues too; the main reasons for these arguments were economic, but also social issues as well. Lack of water and ownership rights on land contributed to these problems, but on these issues, the Mirzabi and the Mohebi banded together to defend the village.

== Demographics ==
=== Population ===
At the time of the 2006 National Census, the village's population was 773 in 198 households. The following census in 2011 counted 820 people in 280 households. The 2016 census measured the population of the village as 521 people in 197 households.
