= Gol Darreh =

Gol Darreh or Goldarreh or Galdarreh (Persian: گلدره) may refer to:

- Gol Darreh, Alborz
- Gol Darreh, Gilan
- Gol Darreh, Malayer, Hamadan Province
- Gol Darreh, Ilam
- Gol Darreh, Isfahan
- Gol Darreh, Kermanshah
- Gol Darreh-ye Olya, Kermanshah
- Gol Darreh-ye Sofla
- Gol Darreh, Delfan, Lorestan Province
- Gol Darreh, Khorramabad, Lorestan Province
- Gol Darreh, Tehran
