= Agah =

Agah may refer to:

== Geography ==
- Agah-e Olya, a village in Kermanshah Province, Iran
- Agah-e Sofla, a village in Kermanshah Province, Iran

== See also ==
- Agahi (disambiguation)
- Agha (disambiguation)
- Agah (name)
