= Haft Ashiyan =

Haft Ashiyan or Haft Ashian (Persian: هفت اشيان) may refer to:

- Haft Ashiyan, Kermanshah
- Haft Ashiyan, Sonqor, Kermanshah Province
- Haft Ashiyan Rural District, in Kermanshah Province
