= Dar Gol (disambiguation) =

Dar Gol is a village in Hormozgan Province, Iran.

Dar Gol (Persian: دارگل) may also refer to:

- Dar Gol-e Seyyed Hasan, Kermanshah Province
- Dar Gol-e Teymaz, Kermanshah Province
- Dar Gol, Lorestan

== See also ==
- Dargol
