= Milkeh =

Milkeh or Milekeh (Persian: ميلكه), also rendered as Milgeh or Millehgah or Milleh Gawana, may refer to:

- Milkeh-ye Baqer
- Milkeh-ye Buchan
- Milkeh-ye Shir Khan
