= Qelij Khani =

Qelij Khani قليج خاني
- Village
- Location within Iran
- Coordinates: 34°26′47″N 46°38′14″E
- Country: Iran
- Province: Kermanshah
- County: Kermanshah
- Bakhsh: Kuzaran
- Rural District: Sanjabi

Population (2006)
  - Total: 241
- Time zone: UTC+3:30 (IRST)
  - Summer (DST): UTC+4:30 (IRDT)

Qelij Khani (Persian: قليج خاني, also Romanized as Qelīj Khānī and Qalīj Khānī; also known as Kaleh Kalitch Khāni and Qelīch Khānī) is a village in Sanjabi Rural District, Kuzaran District, Kermanshah County, Kermanshah Province, Iran. At the 2006 census, its population was 241, in 46 families.
