= Hemmatabad, Najafabad =

Village in Isfahan province, Iran

Hemmatabad Persian: همت اباد
- Village
- Location within Iran
- Coordinates: 32°40′00″N 51°15′56″E
- Country: Iran
- Province: Isfahan
- County: Najafabad
- District: Central
- Rural District: Sadeqiyeh

Population (2016)
  - Total: 344
- Time zone: UTC+3:30 (IRST)

Hemmatabad (Persian: همت اباد) (Note: Also romanized as Hemmatābād) is a village in Sadeqiyeh Rural District of the Central District in Najafabad County, Isfahan province, Iran.

== Demographics ==
=== Population ===
At the time of the 2006 National Census, the village's population was 141 in 41 households. The following census in 2011 counted 205 people in 59 households. The 2016 census measured the population of the village as 344 people in 81 households.
