= Jalalabad, Najafabad =

Village in Isfahan province, Iran

Jalalabad Persian: جلال اباد
- Village
- Location within Iran
- Coordinates: 32°36′22″N 51°19′03″E
- Country: Iran
- Province: Isfahan
- County: Najafabad
- District: Central
- Rural District: Sadeqiyeh

Population (2016)
  - Total: 4,056
- Time zone: UTC+3:30 (IRST)

Jalalabad (Persian: جلال اباد) (Note: Also romanized as Jalālābād; also known as ‘Alīābād) is a village in Sadeqiyeh Rural District of the Central District in Najafabad County, Isfahan province, Iran.

== Demographics ==
=== Population ===
At the time of the 2006 National Census, the village's population was 1,973 in 536 households. The following census in 2011 counted 3,183 people in 959 households. The 2016 census measured the population of the village as 4,056 people in 1,223 households, the most populous in its rural district.
