= Chahar Melan =

Chahar Melan چهارملان
- Village
- Location within Iran
- Coordinates: 34°49′55″N 47°19′28″E
- Country: Iran
- Province: Kermanshah
- County: Sonqor
- Bakhsh: Kolyai
- Rural District: Satar

Population (2006)
  - Total: 102
- Time zone: UTC+3:30 (IRST)
  - Summer (DST): UTC+4:30 (IRDT)

Chahar Melan (Persian: چهارملان, also Romanized as Chahār Melān) is a village in Satar Rural District, Kolyai District, Sonqor County, Kermanshah Province, Iran. At the 2006 census, its population was 102, in 23 families.
