= Khvorneh =

Khvorneh or Khurneh (Persian: خورنه) may refer to:

- Khvorneh-ye Olya
- Khvorneh-ye Sofla
