= Sarbor-e Jadid =

Sarbor-e Jadid سربرجديد
- Village
- Location within Iran
- Coordinates: 34°31′57″N 46°39′14″E
- Country: Iran
- Province: Kermanshah
- County: Kermanshah
- Bakhsh: Kuzaran
- Rural District: Sanjabi

Population (2006)
  - Total: 126
- Time zone: UTC+3:30 (IRST)
  - Summer (DST): UTC+4:30 (IRDT)

Sarbor-e Jadid (Persian: سربرجديد, also Romanized as Sarbor-e Jadīd; also known as Sarbor) is a village in Sanjabi Rural District, Kuzaran District, Kermanshah County, Kermanshah Province, Iran. At the 2006 census, its population was 126, in 30 families.
