= Gel-e Sorkheh =

Gel-e Sorkheh گل سرخه
- Village
- Location within Iran
- Coordinates: 35°02′15″N 47°24′58″E
- Country: Iran
- Province: Kermanshah
- County: Sonqor
- Bakhsh: Kolyai
- Rural District: Agahan

Population (2006)
  - Total: 302
- Time zone: UTC+3:30 (IRST)
  - Summer (DST): UTC+4:30 (IRDT)

Gel-e Sorkheh (Persian: گل سرخه, also Romanized as Gel Sorkheh and Gol Sorkheh; also known as Gelah Sorkheh, Goleh Sorkheh, Qal‘eh Sūrkeh, and Qal‘eh-ye Sorkheh) is a village in Agahan Rural District, Kolyai District, Sonqor County, Kermanshah Province, Iran. At the 2006 census, its population was 302, in 61 families.
