= Gandomban =

Gandomban (Persian: گندمبان) may refer to:

- Gandomban-e Olya
- Gandomban-e Sofla
