= Dashti Bolagh =

Dashti Bolagh داشتي بلاغ
- Village
- Location within Iran
- Coordinates: 34°48′13″N 47°32′05″E
- Country: Iran
- Province: Kermanshah
- County: Sonqor
- Bakhsh: Kolyai
- Rural District: Satar

Population (2006)
  - Total: 504
- Time zone: UTC+3:30 (IRST)
  - Summer (DST): UTC+4:30 (IRDT)

Dashti Bolagh (Persian: داشتي بلاغ, also Romanized as Dāshtī Bolāgh; also known as Dāshlī Bolāgh and Dāshtī Bolāghī) is a village in Satar Rural District, Kolyai District, Sonqor County, Kermanshah Province, Iran. At the 2006 census, its population was 504, in 128 families.
