= Qaleh Gelineh (disambiguation) =

Qaleh Gelineh is a village in Kermanshah Province, Iran.

Qaleh Gelineh or Qaleh-ye Gelineh or Qaleh Galineh or Qaleh-ye Galineh (Persian: قلعه گلينه) may also refer to:

- Qaleh Gelineh-ye Olya
- Qaleh Gelineh-ye Sofla
