= Gol Darreh, Lorestan =

Gol Darreh, Lorestan may refer to:

- Gol Darreh, Delfan
- Gol Darreh, Khorramabad
