= Marivani =

Marivani or Mariwani or Meriwani (Persian: مريواني) may refer to:

- Marivani Webdesign, a webdesigner in The Netherlands
- Marivani-ye Bidgoli
- Marivani-ye Kakiha
