= Hajjiabad, Najafabad =

Village in Isfahan province, Iran

Hajjiabad Persian: حاجي اباد
- Village
- Location within Iran
- Coordinates: 32°39′04″N 51°14′59″E
- Country: Iran
- Province: Isfahan
- County: Najafabad
- District: Central
- Rural District: Sadeqiyeh

Population (2016)
  - Total: 3,448
- Time zone: UTC+3:30 (IRST)

Hajjiabad (Persian: حاجي اباد) (Note: Also romanized as Ḩājīābād and Hājjīābād) is a village in, and the capital of, Sadeqiyeh Rural District in the Central District of Najafabad County, Isfahan province, Iran.

== Demographics ==
=== Population ===
At the time of the 2006 National Census, the village's population was 2,449 in 686 households. The following census in 2011 counted 2,842 people in 877 households. The 2016 census measured the population of the village as 3,448 people in 1,060 households.
