= Kheyrabad, Najafabad =

Village in Isfahan province, Iran

Kheyrabad Persian: خيراباد
- Village
- Location within Iran
- Coordinates: 33°03′13″N 50°45′50″E
- Country: Iran
- Province: Isfahan
- County: Najafabad
- District: Mehrdasht
- Rural District: Eshen

Population (2016)
  - Total: 486
- Time zone: UTC+3:30 (IRST)

Kheyrabad (Persian: خيراباد) (Note: Also romanized as Kheyrābād; also known as Khairābād) is a village in Eshen Rural District (Note: Formerly Arabestan-e Olya Rural District) of Mehrdasht District in Najafabad County, Isfahan province, Iran.

== Demographics ==
=== Population ===
At the time of the 2006 National Census, the village's population was 750 in 196 households. The following census in 2011 counted 660 people in 227 households. The 2016 census measured the population of the village as 486 people in 180 households.
