= Chegeni =

Chegeni or Chegini may refer to:

Places in Iran

- Chegini, Alborz, a village in Alborz province
- Chegeni, Ilam, a village in Ilam province
- Chegeni-ye Olya, a village in Kermanshah province
- Chegeni-ye Sofla, a village in Kermanshah province
- Chegeni County (formerly Dowreh County), an administrative division of Lorestan province
- Chegeni District, former name of the Central District of Chegeni County, Lorestan province
- Dowreh-e Chegeni District, former name of the Central District of Chegeni County
- Dowreh-ye Chegeni District, former name of the Central District of Chegeni County
