= Kashkamir =

Kashkamir كشكمير
- Village
- Location within Iran
- Coordinates: 34°50′38″N 47°06′23″E
- Country: Iran
- Province: Kermanshah
- County: Sonqor
- Bakhsh: Kolyai
- Rural District: Kivanat

Population (2006)
  - Total: 96
- Time zone: UTC+3:30 (IRST)
  - Summer (DST): UTC+4:30 (IRDT)

Kashkamir (Persian: كشكمير, also Romanized as Kashkamīr; also known as Kashkamīr-e Pā’īn, Kashkamīr-e Soflá, and Kashkeh Mīr-e Soflá) is a village in Kivanat Rural District, Kolyai District, Sonqor County, Kermanshah Province, Iran. At the 2006 census, its population was 96, in 22 families.
