= Qul Darreh =

Qul Darreh قول دره
- Village
- Location within Iran
- Coordinates: 34°57′40″N 47°11′00″E
- Country: Iran
- Province: Kermanshah
- County: Sonqor
- Bakhsh: Kolyai
- Rural District: Kivanat

Population (2006)
  - Total: 149
- Time zone: UTC+3:30 (IRST)
  - Summer (DST): UTC+4:30 (IRDT)

Qul Darreh (Persian: قول دره, also Romanized as Qūl Darreh; also known as Qūlahdarreh) is a village in Kivanat Rural District, Kolyai District, Sonqor County, Kermanshah Province, Iran. At the 2006 census, its population was 149, in 35 families.
