= Seh Qulan =

Seh Qulan سه قولان
- Village
- Location within Iran
- Coordinates: 34°48′33″N 47°09′56″E
- Country: Iran
- Province: Kermanshah
- County: Sonqor
- Bakhsh: Kolyai
- Rural District: Kivanat

Population (2006)
  - Total: 36
- Time zone: UTC+3:30 (IRST)
  - Summer (DST): UTC+4:30 (IRDT)

Seh Qulan (Persian: سه قولان, also Romanized as Seh Qūlān; also known as Soqūlān) is a village in Kivanat Rural District, Kolyai District, Sonqor County, Kermanshah Province, Iran. At the 2006 census, its population was 36, in 8 families.
