= Aliabad, Hoseynabad =

Village in Isfahan province, Iran

Aliabad Persian: علي اباد
- Village
- Location within Iran
- Coordinates: 33°06′44″N 50°51′13″E
- Country: Iran
- Province: Isfahan
- County: Najafabad
- District: Mehrdasht
- Rural District: Hoseynabad

Population (2016)
  - Total: 270
- Time zone: UTC+3:30 (IRST)

Aliabad (Persian: علی‌آباد) (Note: Also romanized as ‘Alīābād) is a village in Hoseynabad Rural District (Note: Formerly Arabestan-e Sofla Rural District) of Mehrdasht District in Najafabad County, Isfahan province, Iran.

== Demographics ==
=== Population ===
At the time of the 2006 National Census, the village's population was 363 in 100 households. The following census in 2011 counted 324 people in 98 households. The 2016 census measured the population of the village as 270 people in 85 households.
