= Nimdangi, Kuzaran =

Nimdangi نيم دانگي
- Village
- Location within Iran
- Coordinates: 34°21′16″N 46°40′31″E
- Country: Iran
- Province: Kermanshah
- County: Kermanshah
- Bakhsh: Kuzaran
- Rural District: Sanjabi

Population (2006)
  - Total: 65
- Time zone: UTC+3:30 (IRST)
  - Summer (DST): UTC+4:30 (IRDT)

Nimdangi (Persian: نيم دانگي, also Romanized as Nīmdāngī; also known as Nīmdāng) is a village in Sanjabi Rural District, Kuzaran District, Kermanshah County, Kermanshah Province, Iran. At the 2006 census, its population was 65, in 13 families.
