= Sahra-ye Eslamabad, Najafabad =

Village in Isfahan province, Iran

Sahra-ye Eslamabad Persian: صحرااسلام آباد
- Village
- Country: Iran
- Province: Isfahan
- County: Najafabad
- District: Central
- Rural District: Safayyeh

Population (2016)
  - Total: 395
- Time zone: UTC+3:30 (IRST)

Sahra-ye Eslamabad (Persian: صحرااسلام آباد) (Note: Also romanized as Ṣaḥrā-ye Eslāmābād; formerly known as Eslamabad (اسلام اباد), also romanized as Eslāmābād) is a village in Safayyeh Rural District of the Central District in Najafabad County, Isfahan province, Iran.

== Demographics ==
=== Population ===
At the time of the 2006 National Census, the village's population, as Eslamabad, was 872 in 237 households. The following census in 2011 counted 290 people in 89 households. The 2016 census measured the population of the village, relisted as Sahra-ye Eslamabad, at 395 people in 127 households, the most populous in its rural district.
