= Hoseynabad, Najafabad =

Village in Isfahan province, Iran

Hoseynabad Persian: حسين اباد
- Village
- Location within Iran
- Coordinates: 32°58′49″N 51°02′35″E
- Country: Iran
- Province: Isfahan
- County: Najafabad
- District: Mehrdasht
- Rural District: Hoseynabad

Population (2016)
  - Total: 3,087
- Time zone: UTC+3:30 (IRST)

Hoseynabad (Persian: حسين اباد) (Note: Also romanized as Ḩoseynābād; also known as Husainābād) is a village in, and the capital of, Hoseynabad Rural District (Note: Formerly Arabestan-e Sofla Rural District) in Mehrdasht District of Najafabad County, Isfahan province, Iran.

== Demographics ==
=== Population ===
At the time of the 2006 National Census, the village's population was 2,862 in 720 households. The following census in 2011 counted 2,986 people in 852 households. The 2016 census measured the population of the village as 3,087 people in 931 households. It was the most populous village in its rural district.
