= Kahelabad =

Kahelabad كاهل اباد
- Village
- Location within Iran
- Coordinates: 34°48′31″N 47°13′03″E
- Country: Iran
- Province: Kermanshah
- County: Sonqor
- Bakhsh: Kolyai
- Rural District: Kivanat

Population (2006)
  - Total: 50
- Time zone: UTC+3:30 (IRST)
  - Summer (DST): UTC+4:30 (IRDT)

Kahelabad (Persian: كاهل اباد, also Romanized as Kāhelābād) is a village in Kivanat Rural District, Kolyai District, Sonqor County, Kermanshah Province, Iran. At the 2006 census, its population was 50, in 11 families.
