= Chafdar =

Chafdar چفدر
- Village
- Location within Iran
- Coordinates: 34°58′28″N 47°28′47″E
- Country: Iran
- Province: Kermanshah
- County: Sonqor
- Bakhsh: Kolyai
- Rural District: Agahan

Population (2006)
  - Total: 195
- Time zone: UTC+3:30 (IRST)
  - Summer (DST): UTC+4:30 (IRDT)

Chafdar (Persian: چفدر; also known as Chaghdar) is a village in Agahan Rural District, Kolyai District, Sonqor County, Kermanshah Province, Iran. At the 2006 census, its population was 195, in 48 families.
