= Cheshmeh Bad =

Cheshmeh Bad چشمه باد
- Village
- Location within Iran
- Coordinates: 34°51′39″N 47°09′00″E
- Country: Iran
- Province: Kermanshah
- County: Sonqor
- Bakhsh: Kolyai
- Rural District: Kivanat

Population (2006)
  - Total: 112
- Time zone: UTC+3:30 (IRST)
  - Summer (DST): UTC+4:30 (IRDT)

Cheshmeh Bad (Persian: چشمه باد, also Romanized as Cheshmeh Bād and Chashmeh-ye Bād; also known as Kānī Bā, and Kānībad) is a village in Kivanat Rural District, Kolyai District, Sonqor County, Kermanshah Province, Iran. At the 2006 census, its population was 112, in 21 families.
