= Sayeh Kor =

Sayeh Kor or Sayehkor (Persian: سايه كر), also rendered as Saikur or Sadeh Kor or Sayeh Gor or Sayeh Kur, may refer to:

- Sayeh Kor-e Olya
- Sayeh Kor-e Sofla
