= Nilavareh =

Nilavareh (Persian: نيلاوره) may refer to:

- Nilavareh-ye Olya
- Nilavareh-ye Sofla
