= Vizheh =

Vizheh ويژه
- Village
- Location within Iran
- Coordinates: 34°54′37″N 47°11′51″E
- Country: Iran
- Province: Kermanshah
- County: Sonqor
- Bakhsh: Kolyai
- Rural District: Kivanat

Population (2006)
  - Total: 150
- Time zone: UTC+3:30 (IRST)
  - Summer (DST): UTC+4:30 (IRDT)

Vizheh (Persian: ويژه, also Romanized as Vīzheh and Vīzhah) is a village in Kivanat Rural District, Kolyai District, Sonqor County, Kermanshah Province, Iran. At the 2006 census, its population was 150, in 39 families.
