= Cheshmeh-ye Baha ol Din =

Cheshmeh-ye Baha ol Din چشمه بهاالدين
- Village
- Location within Iran
- Coordinates: 34°51′21″N 47°25′58″E
- Country: Iran
- Province: Kermanshah
- County: Sonqor
- Bakhsh: Kolyai
- Rural District: Satar

Population (2006)
  - Total: 265
- Time zone: UTC+3:30 (IRST)
  - Summer (DST): UTC+4:30 (IRDT)

Cheshmeh-ye Baha ol Din (Persian: چشمه بهاالدين, also Romanized as Cheshmeh-ye Bahā' ol Dīn, Chashmeh Baha ud Dīn, Cheshmeh Bāhā’ed Dīn, Cheshmeh-ye Bahā' ed Dīn, and Cheshmeh-ye Bahā' od Dīn) is a village in Satar Rural District, Kolyai District, Sonqor County, Kermanshah province, Iran. At the 2006 census, its population was 265 and included 70 families.
