= Dugolbandeh =

Dugolbandeh دوگل بنده
- Village
- Location within Iran
- Coordinates: 34°52′03″N 47°24′14″E
- Country: Iran
- Province: Kermanshah
- County: Sonqor
- Bakhsh: Kolyai
- Rural District: Satar

Population (2006)
  - Total: 126
- Time zone: UTC+3:30 (IRST)
  - Summer (DST): UTC+4:30 (IRDT)

Dugolbandeh (Persian: دوگل بنده, also Romanized as Dūgolbandeh; also known as Dogolbandeh) is a village in Satar Rural District, Kolyai District, Sonqor County, Kermanshah Province, Iran. At the 2006 census, its population was 126, in 36 families.
