= Aseman Dul =

Aseman Dul اسماندول
- Village
- Location within Iran
- Coordinates: 34°48′05″N 47°24′54″E
- Country: Iran
- Province: Kermanshah
- County: Sonqor
- Bakhsh: Kolyai
- Rural District: Satar

Population (2006)
  - Total: 75
- Time zone: UTC+3:30 (IRST)
  - Summer (DST): UTC+4:30 (IRDT)

Aseman Dul (Persian: اسماندول, also Romanized as Āsemān Dūl) is a village in Satar Rural District, Kolyai District, Sonqor County, Kermanshah Province, Iran. At the 2006 census, its population was 75, in 15 families.
