= Cheshmeh Qaleh =

Cheshmeh Qaleh چشمه قلعه
- Village
- Location within Iran
- Coordinates: 34°47′54″N 47°27′29″E
- Country: Iran
- Province: Kermanshah
- County: Sonqor
- Bakhsh: Kolyai
- Rural District: Satar

Population (2006)
  - Total: 37
- Time zone: UTC+3:30 (IRST)
  - Summer (DST): UTC+4:30 (IRDT)

Cheshmeh Qaleh (Persian: چشمه قلعه, also Romanized as Cheshmeh Qal‘eh) is a village in Satar Rural District, Kolyai District, Sonqor County, Kermanshah province, Iran. At the 2006 census, its population was 37, in 11 families.
