= Zaghan =

Zaghan (Persian: زاغان), also rendered as Zakhan or Jakhan, may refer to:

- Zaghan-e Olya
- Zaghan-e Sofla
