= Vilashahr, Isfahan =

Neighborhood in Isfahan province, Iran

Vilashahrv13 Persian: V13 ويلاشهر vilashahrv13
- Neighborhood
- Vilashahr
- Location within Iran
- Coordinates: 32°40′04″N 51°25′19″E
- Country: Iran
- Province: Isfahan
- County: Najafabad
- District: Central
- City: Najafabad

Population (2014)
  - Total: ~35,000
- Website: https://www.instagram.com/vilashahrv13

Vilashahr (Persian: ويلاشهر) (Note: Also romanized as Vīlā Shahr) is a neighborhood of the city of Najafabad in the Central District of Najafabad County, Isfahan province, Iran. It is 6km from the center of the city.
