= Sar Kashkamir =

Sar Kashkamir سركشكمير
- Village
- Location within Iran
- Coordinates: 34°52′18″N 47°05′21″E
- Country: Iran
- Province: Kermanshah
- County: Sonqor
- Bakhsh: Kolyai
- Rural District: Kivanat

Population (2006)
  - Total: 136
- Time zone: UTC+3:30 (IRST)
  - Summer (DST): UTC+4:30 (IRDT)

Sar Kashkamir (Persian: سركشكمير, also Romanized as Sar Kashkamīr; also known as Kashkamīr-e Bālā, Kashkamīr-e ‘Olyā, Kashkamīr ‘Uliya, and Kashkeh Mīr-e Bālā) is a village in Kivanat Rural District, Kolyai District, Sonqor County, Kermanshah Province, Iran. At the 2006 census, its population was 136, in 27 families.
