= Deh Khodadad =

Deh Khodadad ده خداداد
- Village
- Location within Iran
- Coordinates: 35°01′27″N 47°24′50″E
- Country: Iran
- Province: Kermanshah
- County: Sonqor
- Bakhsh: Kolyai
- Rural District: Agahan

Population (2006)
  - Total: 257
- Time zone: UTC+3:30 (IRST)
  - Summer (DST): UTC+4:30 (IRDT)

Deh Khodadad (Persian: ده خداداد, also Romanized as Deh Khodādād and Deh-e Khodā Dād; also known as Khel Khawāh and Khel Khvāh) is a village in Agahan Rural District, Kolyai District, Sonqor County, Kermanshah Province, Iran. At the 2006 census, its population was 257, in 53 families.
