= Posht-e Darband =

Posht-e Darband پشت دربند
- Village
- Location within Iran
- Coordinates: 34°48′53″N 47°18′45″E
- Country: Iran
- Province: Kermanshah
- County: Sonqor
- Bakhsh: Kolyai
- Rural District: Kivanat

Population (2006)
  - Total: 72
- Time zone: UTC+3:30 (IRST)
  - Summer (DST): UTC+4:30 (IRDT)

Posht-e Darband (Persian: پشت دربند) is a village in Kivanat Rural District, Kolyai District, Sonqor County, Kermanshah Province, Iran. At the 2006 census, its population was 72, in 22 families.
