= Nehzatabad, Najafabad =

Village in Isfahan province, Iran

Nehzatabad Persian: نهضت اباد
- Village
- Location within Iran
- Coordinates: 32°40′04″N 51°11′53″E
- Country: Iran
- Province: Isfahan
- County: Najafabad
- District: Central
- Rural District: Sadeqiyeh

Population (2016)
  - Total: 3,814
- Time zone: UTC+3:30 (IRST)

Nehzatabad (Persian: نهضت اباد) (Note: Also romanized as Nehẕatābād) is a village in Sadeqiyeh Rural District of the Central District in Najafabad County, Isfahan province, Iran.

== Demographics ==
=== Population ===
At the time of the 2006 National Census, the village's population was 3,016 in 816 households. The following census in 2011 counted 3,507 people in 1,056 households. The 2016 census measured the population of the village as 3,814 people in 1,186 households.
