= Rig Jub =

Rig Jub ريگ جوب
- Village
- Location within Iran
- Coordinates: 34°58′52″N 47°21′19″E
- Country: Iran
- Province: Kermanshah
- County: Sonqor
- Bakhsh: Kolyai
- Rural District: Agahan

Population (2006)
  - Total: 87
- Time zone: UTC+3:30 (IRST)
  - Summer (DST): UTC+4:30 (IRDT)

Rig Jub (Persian: ريگ جوب, also Romanized as Rīg Jūb and Rīgjūb) is a village in Agahan Rural District, Kolyai District, Sonqor County, Kermanshah Province, Iran. At the 2006 census, its population was 87, in 20 families.
