= Sefid Zangul =

Sefid Zangul سفيدزنگول
- Village
- Location within Iran
- Coordinates: 35°01′57″N 47°23′26″E
- Country: Iran
- Province: Kermanshah
- County: Sonqor
- Bakhsh: Kolyai
- Rural District: Agahan

Population (2006)
  - Total: 75
- Time zone: UTC+3:30 (IRST)
  - Summer (DST): UTC+4:30 (IRDT)

Sefid Zangul (Persian: سفيدزنگول, also Romanized as Sefīd Zangūl and Safīd Zangūl; also known as Sefīd Jāngur) is a village in Agahan Rural District, Kolyai District, Sonqor County, Kermanshah Province, Iran. At the 2006 census, its population was 75, in 16 families.
