= Kakiha =

Village in Kermanshah, Iran

Kakiha كاكيها
- Village
- Location within Iran
- Coordinates: 34°24′32″N 46°37′17″E
- Country: Iran
- Province: Kermanshah
- County: Kermanshah
- Bakhsh: Kuzaran
- Rural District: Sanjabi

Population (2006)
  - Total: 44
- Time zone: UTC+3:30 (IRST)
  - Summer (DST): UTC+4:30 (IRDT)

Kakiha (Persian: كاكيها, also Romanized as Kākīhā; also known as Kākīel) is a village in Sanjabi Rural District, Kuzaran District, Kermanshah County, Kermanshah Province, Iran. At the 2006 census, its population was 44, in 11 families.
