= Kolah Pa =

Kolah Pa كله پا
- Village
- Location within Iran
- Coordinates: 34°57′41″N 47°21′39″E
- Country: Iran
- Province: Kermanshah
- County: Sonqor
- Bakhsh: Kolyai
- Rural District: Agahan

Population (2006)
  - Total: 104
- Time zone: UTC+3:30 (IRST)
  - Summer (DST): UTC+4:30 (IRDT)

Kolah Pa (Persian: كله پا, also Romanized as Kolah Pā; also known as Kolā Pā) is a village in Agahan Rural District, Kolyai District, Sonqor County, Kermanshah Province, Iran. At the 2006 census, its population was 104, in 23 families.
