= Elyasan =

Elyasan الياسان
- Village
- Location within Iran
- Coordinates: 34°50′53″N 47°19′38″E
- Country: Iran
- Province: Kermanshah
- County: Sonqor
- Bakhsh: Kolyai
- Rural District: Satar

Population (2006)
  - Total: 76
- Time zone: UTC+3:30 (IRST)
  - Summer (DST): UTC+4:30 (IRDT)

Elyasan (Persian: الياسان, also Romanized as Elyāsān; also known as Elyāsān-e ‘Olyā) is a village in Satar Rural District, Kolyai District, Sonqor County, Kermanshah Province, Iran. At the 2006 census, its population was 76, in 22 families.
