= Zandhar =

Zandhar زندهر
- Village
- Location within Iran
- Coordinates: 34°20′22″N 46°39′37″E
- Country: Iran
- Province: Kermanshah
- County: Kermanshah
- Bakhsh: Kuzaran
- Rural District: Haft Ashiyan

Population (2006)
  - Total: 62
- Time zone: UTC+3:30 (IRST)
  - Summer (DST): UTC+4:30 (IRDT)

Zandhar (Persian: زندهر) (Note: Zandhar at GEOnet Names Server) is a village in Haft Ashiyan Rural District, Kuzaran District, Kermanshah County, Kermanshah Province, Iran. At the 2006 census, its population was 62, in 16 families.
