= Cheshmeh Qot =

Cheshmeh Qot چشمه قط
- Village
- Location within Iran
- Coordinates: 34°47′29″N 47°21′58″E
- Country: Iran
- Province: Kermanshah
- County: Sonqor
- Bakhsh: Kolyai
- Rural District: Satar

Population (2006)
  - Total: 127
- Time zone: UTC+3:30 (IRST)
  - Summer (DST): UTC+4:30 (IRDT)

Cheshmeh Qot (Persian: چشمه قط, also Romanized as Cheshmeh Qoţ) is a village in Satar Rural District, Kolyai District, Sonqor County, Kermanshah Province, Iran. At the 2006 census, its population was 127, in 30 families.
