= Amir Emran =

Amir Emran اميرعمران
- Village
- Location within Iran
- Coordinates: 34°58′18″N 47°19′42″E
- Country: Iran
- Province: Kermanshah
- County: Sonqor
- Bakhsh: Kolyai
- Rural District: Agahan

Population (2006)
  - Total: 389
- Time zone: UTC+3:30 (IRST)
  - Summer (DST): UTC+4:30 (IRDT)

Amir Emran (Persian: اميرعمران, also Romanized as Amīr ‘Emrān and Amīr ‘Omrān; also known as Amīr ol ‘Emrān, Amīr ol Omarā’, Mīr Marān, Mīr ‘Omān, and Mīr Umrān) is a village in Agahan Rural District, Kolyai District, Sonqor County, Kermanshah Province, Iran. At the 2006 census, its population was 389, in 76 families.
