= Burakah =

Burakah بوركه
- Village
- Location within Iran
- Coordinates: 34°57′22″N 47°23′54″E
- Country: Iran
- Province: Kermanshah
- County: Sonqor
- Bakhsh: Kolyai
- Rural District: Agahan

Population (2006)
  - Total: 106
- Time zone: UTC+3:30 (IRST)
  - Summer (DST): UTC+4:30 (IRDT)

Burakah (Persian: بوركه, also Romanized as Būrakah) is a village in Agahan Rural District, Kolyai District, Sonqor County, Kermanshah Province, Iran. At the 2006 census, its population was 106, in 28 families.
