= Qaleh-ye Hajj Amin =

Qaleh-ye Hajj Amin قلعه حاج امين
- Village
- Location within Iran
- Coordinates: 34°48′50″N 47°34′13″E
- Country: Iran
- Province: Kermanshah
- County: Sonqor
- Bakhsh: Kolyai
- Rural District: Satar

Population (2006)
  - Total: 456
- Time zone: UTC+3:30 (IRST)
  - Summer (DST): UTC+4:30 (IRDT)

Qaleh-ye Hajj Amin (Persian: قلعه حاج امين, also Romanized as Qal‘eh-ye Ḩājj Amīn; also known as Qal‘eh-ye Ḩājjī Amīn) is a village in Satar Rural District, Kolyai District, Sonqor County, Kermanshah Province, Iran. At the 2006 census, its population was 456, in 119 families.
