= Shirzadabad =

Shirzadabad شيرزاداباد
- Village
- Location within Iran
- Coordinates: 34°21′31″N 46°33′08″E
- Country: Iran
- Province: Kermanshah
- County: Kermanshah
- Bakhsh: Kuzaran
- Rural District: Haft Ashiyan

Population (2006)
  - Total: 42
- Time zone: UTC+3:30 (IRST)
  - Summer (DST): UTC+4:30 (IRDT)

Shirzadabad (Persian: شيرزاداباد, also Romanized as Shīrzādābād) is a village in Haft Ashiyan Rural District, Kuzaran District, Kermanshah County, Kermanshah Province, Iran. At the 2006 census, its population was 42, in 10 families.
