= Sabz Ali Khan, Iran =

Sabz Ali Khan سبزعلي خان
- Village
- Location within Iran
- Coordinates: 34°24′50″N 46°31′53″E
- Country: Iran
- Province: Kermanshah
- County: Kermanshah
- Bakhsh: Kuzaran
- Rural District: Sanjabi

Population (2006)
  - Total: 137
- Time zone: UTC+3:30 (IRST)
  - Summer (DST): UTC+4:30 (IRDT)

Sabz Ali Khan (Persian: سبزعلي خان, also Romanized as Sabz ‘Alī Khān; also known as Dah Sabz Ali Khan and Deh Sabz Ali Khān) is a village in Sanjabi Rural District, Kuzaran District, Kermanshah County, Kermanshah Province, Iran. At the 2006 census, its population was 137, in 29 families.
