= Marzaleh =

Marzaleh مرزاله
- Village
- Location within Iran
- Coordinates: 34°50′03″N 47°25′44″E
- Country: Iran
- Province: Kermanshah
- County: Sonqor
- Bakhsh: Kolyai
- Rural District: Satar

Population (2006)
  - Total: 117
- Time zone: UTC+3:30 (IRST)
  - Summer (DST): UTC+4:30 (IRDT)

Mazraleh (Persian: مرزاله, also Romanized as Mazrāleh; also known as Mazr Ālā) is a village in Satar Rural District, Kolyai District, Sonqor County, Kermanshah Province, Iran. At the 2006 census, its population was 117, in 27 families.
