= Filur, Iran =

Village in Isfahan province, Iran

Filur Persian: فيلور
- Village
- Location within Iran
- Coordinates: 32°31′23″N 51°24′16″E
- Country: Iran
- Province: Isfahan
- County: Najafabad
- District: Central
- Rural District: Jowzdan

Population (2016)
  - Total: 1,012
- Time zone: UTC+3:30 (IRST)

Filur (Persian: فيلور) (Note: Also romanized as Fīlūr) is a village in Jowzdan Rural District of the Central District in Najafabad County, Isfahan province, Iran.

== Demographics ==
=== Population ===
At the time of the 2006 National Census, the village's population was 935 in 213 households. The following census in 2011 counted 1,039 people in 301 households. The 2016 census measured the population of the village as 1,012 people in 294 households.
