= Jub Kabud-e Olya =

Jub Kabud-e Olya جوب كبودعليا
- Village
- Location within Iran
- Coordinates: 34°51′53″N 47°30′38″E
- Country: Iran
- Province: Kermanshah
- County: Sonqor
- Bakhsh: Kolyai
- Rural District: Satar

Population (2006)
  - Total: 208
- Time zone: UTC+3:30 (IRST)
  - Summer (DST): UTC+4:30 (IRDT)

Jub Kabud-e Olya (Persian: جوب كبودعليا, also Romanized as Jūb Kabūd-e ‘Olyā, and Joob Kaboodé Olya; also known as Jow Kabūd-e Bālā, Jūb Kabūd, and Jūb Kabūd-e Bālā) is a village in Satar Rural District, Kolyai District, Sonqor County, Kermanshah Province, Iran. At the 2006 census, its population was 208, in 61 families.
