= Choqur Chah =

Choqur Chah چقور چاه
- Village
- Location within Iran
- Coordinates: 34°53′03″N 47°26′21″E
- Country: Iran
- Province: Kermanshah
- County: Sonqor
- Bakhsh: Kolyai
- Rural District: Satar

Population (2006)
  - Total: 90
- Time zone: UTC+3:30 (IRST)
  - Summer (DST): UTC+4:30 (IRDT)

Choqur Chah (Persian: چقور چاه, also Romanized as Choqūr Chāh; also known as Choqerchāh and Choqerchah) is a village in Satar Rural District, Kolyai District, Sonqor County, Kermanshah Province, Iran. At the 2006 census, its population was 90, in 24 families.
