= Saman Ban =

Saman Ban سمن بان
- Village
- Location within Iran
- Coordinates: 34°55′08″N 47°17′35″E
- Country: Iran
- Province: Kermanshah
- County: Sonqor
- Bakhsh: Kolyai
- Rural District: Kivanat

Population (2006)
  - Total: 279
- Time zone: UTC+3:30 (IRST)
  - Summer (DST): UTC+4:30 (IRDT)

Saman Ban (Persian: سمن بان, also Romanized as Saman Bān and Samanbān; also known as Saman Band and Saman Baneh) is a village in Kivanat Rural District, Kolyai District, Sonqor County, Kermanshah Province, Iran. At the 2006 census, its population was 279, in 68 families.
