= Jowzdan (disambiguation) =

Jowzdan is a city in Najafabad County, Isfahan Province, Iran

Jowzdan (Persian: جوزدان) may also refer to:

- Jowzdan Communal Housing, Najafabad County
- Jowzdan, Isfahan, Isfahan County
- Jowzdan Rural District, in Najafabad County
