= Choqa Reza =

Choqa Reza چقارضا
- Village
- Location within Iran
- Coordinates: 34°28′10″N 46°40′44″E
- Country: Iran
- Province: Kermanshah
- County: Kermanshah
- Bakhsh: Kuzaran
- Rural District: Sanjabi

Population (2006)
  - Total: 103
- Time zone: UTC+3:30 (IRST)
  - Summer (DST): UTC+4:30 (IRDT)

Choqa Reza (Persian: چقارضا, also Romanized as Choqā Reẕā) is a village in Sanjabi Rural District, Kuzaran District, Kermanshah County, Kermanshah Province, Iran. At the 2006 census, its population was 103, in 22 families.
