= Cheshmeh Gilan =

Cheshmeh Gilan چشمه گيلان
- Village
- Location within Iran
- Coordinates: 34°51′54″N 47°19′56″E
- Country: Iran
- Province: Kermanshah
- County: Sonqor
- Bakhsh: Kolyai
- Rural District: Satar

Population (2006)
  - Total: 213
- Time zone: UTC+3:30 (IRST)
  - Summer (DST): UTC+4:30 (IRDT)

Cheshmeh Gilan (Persian: چشمه گيلان, also Romanized as Cheshmeh Gīlān) is a village in Satar Rural District, Kolyai District, Sonqor County, Kermanshah Province, Iran. At the 2006 census, its population was 213, in 63 families.
