= Tappeh-ye Esmail =

Tappeh-ye Esmail تپه اسماعيل
- Village
- Location within Iran
- Coordinates: 34°55′29″N 47°12′07″E
- Country: Iran
- Province: Kermanshah
- County: Sonqor
- Bakhsh: Kolyai
- Rural District: Kivanat

Population (2006)
  - Total: 191
- Time zone: UTC+3:30 (IRST)
  - Summer (DST): UTC+4:30 (IRDT)

Tappeh-ye Esmail (Persian: تپه اسماعيل, also Romanized as Tappeh-ye Esmā‘īl) is a village in Kivanat Rural District, Kolyai District, Sonqor County, Kermanshah province, Iran. At the 2006 census, its population was 191, in 54 families.
