= Azreh =

Azreh (Persian: ازره) may refer to:

- Azreh-ye Mohammad Khan
- Azreh-ye Mokarrami
