= Kuy-e Lotf =

Village in Isfahan province, Iran

Kuy-e Lotf Persian: كوي لطف
- Village
- Location within Iran
- Country: Iran
- Province: Isfahan
- County: Najafabad
- District: Mehrdasht
- Rural District: Eshen

Population (2016)
  - Total: 17
- Time zone: UTC+3:30 (IRST)

Kuy-e Lotf (Persian: كوي لطف) (Note: Also romanized as Kūy-e Loţf; also known as Kūh Loţf and Kūh-e Loţf) is a village in Eshen Rural District (Note: Formerly Arabestan-e Olya Rural District) of Mehrdasht District in Najafabad County, Isfahan province, Iran.

== Demographics ==
=== Population ===
At the time of the 2006 National Census, the village's population was 14 in six households. The following census in 2011 counted 11 people in five households. The 2016 census measured the population of the village as 17 people in six households.
