= Marivani-ye Bidgoli =

Marivani-ye Bidgoli مريواني بيدگلي
- Village
- Location within Iran
- Coordinates: 34°19′10″N 46°36′46″E
- Country: Iran
- Province: Kermanshah
- County: Kermanshah
- Bakhsh: Kuzaran
- Rural District: Haft Ashiyan

Population (2006)
  - Total: 151
- Time zone: UTC+3:30 (IRST)
  - Summer (DST): UTC+4:30 (IRDT)

Marivani-ye Bidgoli (Persian: مريواني بيدگلي, also Romanized as Marīvānī-ye Bīdgolī; also known as Marīvānī-ye Bīdgol) is a village in Haft Ashiyan Rural District, Kuzaran District, Kermanshah County, Kermanshah Province, Iran. At the 2006 census, its population was 151, in 38 families.
