= Sayeh Kor-e Sofla =

Sayeh Kor-e Sofla سايه كرسفلي
- Village
- Location within Iran
- Coordinates: 34°58′19″N 47°25′45″E
- Country: Iran
- Province: Kermanshah
- County: Sonqor
- Bakhsh: Kolyai
- Rural District: Agahan

Population (2006)
  - Total: 277
- Time zone: UTC+3:30 (IRST)
  - Summer (DST): UTC+4:30 (IRDT)

Sayeh Kor-e Sofla (Persian: سايه كرسفلي, also Romanized as Sāyeh Kor-e Soflá and Sāyehkor-e Soflá; also known as Sādeh Kor-e Soflá, Sāikūr, Sāyeh Gor-e Pā’īn, Sāyeh Kor-e Pā’īn, Sayeh Kūr-e Pā’īn, and Sāyeh Kūr-e Soflá) is a village in Agahan Rural District, Kolyai District, Sonqor County, Kermanshah Province, Iran. At the 2006 census, its population was 277, in 74 families.
