= Gol Darreh-ye Olya, Kermanshah =

Gol Darreh-ye Olya گلدره عليا
- Village
- Location within Iran
- Coordinates: 34°25′02″N 46°32′54″E
- Country: Iran
- Province: Kermanshah
- County: Kermanshah
- Bakhsh: Kuzaran
- Rural District: Sanjabi

Population (2006)
  - Total: 55
- Time zone: UTC+3:30 (IRST)
  - Summer (DST): UTC+4:30 (IRDT)

Gol Darreh-ye Olya (Persian: گلدره عليا, also Romanized as Gol Darreh-ye ‘Olyā) is a village in Sanjabi Rural District, Kuzaran District, Kermanshah County, Kermanshah Province, Iran. At the 2006 census, its population was 55, in 12 families.
