= Rahmatabad, Najafabad =

Village in Isfahan province, Iran

Rahmatabad Persian: رحمت اباد
- Village
- Location within Iran
- Coordinates: 32°30′29″N 51°24′41″E
- Country: Iran
- Province: Isfahan
- County: Najafabad
- District: Central
- Rural District: Jowzdan

Population (2016)
  - Total: 2,153
- Time zone: UTC+3:30 (IRST)

Rahmatabad (Persian: رحمت اباد) (Note: Also romanized as Raḩmatābād; formerly known as Soltanabad (سلطان‌ آباد)) is a village in Jowzdan Rural District of the Central District in Najafabad County, Isfahan province, Iran.

== Demographics ==
=== Population ===
At the time of the 2006 National Census, the village's population was 1,692 in 420 households. The following census in 2011 counted 2,105 people in 596 households. The 2016 census measured the population of the village as 2,153 people in 621 households, the most populous in its rural district.
