= Gol Darreh, Isfahan =

Village in Isfahan province, Iran

Gol Darreh Persian: گلدره
- Village
- Location within Iran
- Coordinates: 33°03′12″N 50°41′53″E
- Country: Iran
- Province: Isfahan
- County: Najafabad
- District: Mehrdasht
- Rural District: Eshen

Population (2016)
  - Total: 1,128
- Time zone: UTC+3:30 (IRST)

Gol Darreh (Persian: گلدره) (Note: Also known as Gul Darreh) is a village in Eshen Rural District (Note: Formerly Arabestan-e Olya Rural District) of Mehrdasht District in Najafabad County, Isfahan province, Iran.

== Demographics ==
=== Population ===
At the time of the 2006 National Census, the village's population was 1,093 in 251 households. The following census in 2011 counted 1,121 people in 353 households. The 2016 census measured the population of the village as 1,128 people in 355 households.
