= Gandomban-e Sofla =

Gandomban-e Sofla گندمبان سفلي
- Village
- Location within Iran
- Coordinates: 34°31′35″N 46°44′18″E
- Country: Iran
- Province: Kermanshah
- County: Kermanshah
- Bakhsh: Kuzaran
- Rural District: Sanjabi

Population (2006)
  - Total: 44
- Time zone: UTC+3:30 (IRST)
  - Summer (DST): UTC+4:30 (IRDT)

Gandomban-e Sofla (Persian: گندمبان سفلي, also Romanized as Gandombān-e Soflá) is a village in Sanjabi Rural District, Kuzaran District, Kermanshah County, Kermanshah Province, Iran.

== Census ==
At the 2006 census, its population was 44, in 10 families.
