= Sayeh Kor-e Olya =

Sayeh Kor-e Olya سايه كرعليا
- Village
- Location within Iran
- Coordinates: 34°59′23″N 47°25′33″E
- Country: Iran
- Province: Kermanshah
- County: Sonqor
- Bakhsh: Kolyai
- Rural District: Agahan

Population (2006)
  - Total: 231
- Time zone: UTC+3:30 (IRST)
  - Summer (DST): UTC+4:30 (IRDT)

Sayeh Kor-e Olya (Persian: سايه كرعليا, also Romanized as Sāyeh Kor-e ‘Olyā and Sāyehkor-e ‘Olyā' also known as Sādeh Kor-e ‘Olyā, Sāikūr, Sāyeh Gor-e Bālā, Sāyehkor-e Bālā, Sāyeh Kūr-e Bālā, and Sāyeh Kūr-e ‘Olyā) is a village in Agahan Rural District, Kolyai District, Sonqor County, Kermanshah Province, Iran. At the 2006 census, its population was 231, in 44 families.
