= Zaghan-e Sofla =

Zaghan-e Sofla زاغان سفلي
- Village
- Location within Iran
- Coordinates: 35°00′09″N 47°22′10″E
- Country: Iran
- Province: Kermanshah
- County: Sonqor
- Bakhsh: Kolyai
- Rural District: Agahan

Population (2006)
  - Total: 286
- Time zone: UTC+3:30 (IRST)
  - Summer (DST): UTC+4:30 (IRDT)

Zaghan-e Sofla (Persian: زاغان سفلي, also Romanized as Zāghān-e Soflá; also known as Jākhan-e Pā’īn, Jākhan Pāin, and Zākhān-e Pā'īn) is a village in Agahan Rural District, Kolyai District, Sonqor County, Kermanshah Province, Iran. At the 2006 census, its population was 286, in 63 families.
