= Milkeh-ye Shir Khan =

Milkeh-ye Shir Khan ميلكه شيرخان
- Village
- Location within Iran
- Coordinates: 34°20′39″N 46°37′22″E
- Country: Iran
- Province: Kermanshah
- County: Kermanshah
- Bakhsh: Kuzaran
- Rural District: Haft Ashiyan

Population (2006)
  - Total: 79
- Time zone: UTC+3:30 (IRST)
  - Summer (DST): UTC+4:30 (IRDT)

Milkeh-ye Shir Khan (Persian: ميلكه شيرخان, also Romanized as Mīlkeh-ye Shīr Khān and Mīlekeh-ye Shīrkhān; also known as Mīlgeh-e Shīrkhān, Mīlkeh, Mīllehgāh, and Mīlleh Gāwāna) is a village in Haft Ashiyan Rural District, Kuzaran District, Kermanshah County, Kermanshah Province, Iran. At the 2006 census, its population was 79, in 21 families.
