= Shurabad, Sonqor =

Village in Kermanshah province, Iran

Shurabad شورآباد
- Village
- Location within Iran
- Coordinates: 34°47′32″N 47°30′00″E
- Country: Iran
- Province: Kermanshah
- County: Sonqor
- District: Kolyai
- Rural District: Satar

Population (2016)
  - Total: 500
- Time zone: UTC+3:30 (IRST)

Shurabad (Persian: شورآباد) (Note: Also romanized as Shūrābād) is a village in Satar Rural District of Kolyai District, Sonqor County, Kermanshah province, Iran.

== Demographics ==
=== Population ===
At the time of the 2006 National Census, the village's population was 608 in 158 households. The following census in 2011 counted 475 people in 119 households. The 2016 census measured the population of the village as 500 people in 148 households. It was the most populous village in its rural district.
