= Chegeni-ye Sofla =

Chegeni-ye Sofla چگني سفلي
- Village
- Location within Iran
- Coordinates: 34°30′00″N 46°39′00″E
- Country: Iran
- Province: Kermanshah
- County: Kermanshah
- Bakhsh: Kuzaran
- Rural District: Sanjabi

Population (2006)
  - Total: 181
- Time zone: UTC+3:30 (IRST)
  - Summer (DST): UTC+4:30 (IRDT)

Chegeni-ye Sofla (Persian: چگني سفلي, also Romanized as Chegenī-ye Soflá) is a village in Sanjabi Rural District, Kuzaran District, Kermanshah County, Kermanshah Province, Iran. At the 2006 census, its population was 181, in 44 families.
