= Baban Yavar-e Azizi =

Village in Kermanshah province, Iran

Baban Yavar-e Azizi Persian: بابان ياور عزيزي
- Village
- Location within Iran
- Coordinates: 34°29′09″N 46°37′21″E
- Country: Iran
- Province: Kermanshah
- County: Kermanshah
- District: Kuzaran
- Rural District: Sanjabi

Population (2016)
  - Total: 490
- Time zone: UTC+3:30 (IRST)

Baban Yavar-e Azizi (Persian: بابان ياور عزيزي) (Note: Also romanized as Bābān Yāvar-e ‘Azīzī) is a village in Sanjabi Rural District of Kuzaran District, Kermanshah County, Kermanshah province, Iran.

== Demographics ==
=== Population ===
At the time of the 2006 National Census, the village's population was 666 in 143 households. The following census in 2011 counted 610 people in 162 households. The 2016 census measured the population of the village as 490 people in 140 households. It was the most populous village in its rural district.
