= Eshen =

Village in Isfahan province, Iran

Eshen Persian: اشن
- Village
- Location within Iran
- Coordinates: 33°05′29″N 50°40′50″E
- Country: Iran
- Province: Isfahan
- County: Najafabad
- District: Mehrdasht
- Rural District: Eshen

Population (2016)
  - Total: 2,748
- Time zone: UTC+3:30 (IRST)

Eshen (Persian: اشن) (Note: Also romanized as Ashan, Eshan, and Ishan; also known as Asheh) is a village in, and the capital of, Eshen Rural District (Note: Formerly Arabestan-e Olya Rural District) in Mehrdasht District of Najafabad County, Isfahan province, Iran.

== Demographics ==
=== Language ===
The village is Persian-speaking.

=== Population ===
At the time of the 2006 National Census, the village's population was 2,735 in 709 households. The following census in 2011 counted 2,816 people in 865 households. The 2016 census measured the population of the village as 2,748 people in 876 households, the most populous in its rural district.

== Notable people ==
Noureddin Esheni Qudejani
