= Milkeh-ye Baqer =

Milkeh-ye Baqer ميلكه باقر
- Village
- Location within Iran
- Coordinates: 34°19′56″N 46°36′17″E
- Country: Iran
- Province: Kermanshah
- County: Kermanshah
- Bakhsh: Kuzaran
- Rural District: Haft Ashiyan

Population (2006)
  - Total: 44
- Time zone: UTC+3:30 (IRST)
  - Summer (DST): UTC+4:30 (IRDT)

Milkeh-ye Baqer (Persian: ميلكه باقر, also Romanized as Mīlkeh-ye Bāqer; also known as Mīlgeh-e Bāqar and Millehgāh) is a village in Haft Ashiyan Rural District, Kuzaran District, Kermanshah County, Kermanshah Province, Iran. At the 2006 census, its population was 44, in 8 families.
