= Khundab =

Village in Isfahan province, Iran

Khundab Persian: خونداب
- Village
- Location within Iran
- Coordinates: 33°07′57″N 50°53′52″E
- Country: Iran
- Province: Isfahan
- County: Najafabad
- District: Mehrdasht
- Rural District: Hoseynabad

Population (2016)
  - Total: 1,073
- Time zone: UTC+3:30 (IRST)

Khundab (Persian: خونداب) (Note: Also romanized as Khūndāb; also known as Kondāb) is a village in Hoseynabad Rural District (Note: Formerly Arabestan-e Sofla Rural District) of Mehrdasht District in Najafabad County, Isfahan province, Iran.

== Demographics ==
=== Population ===
At the time of the 2006 National Census, the village's population was 1,652 in 405 households. The following census in 2011 counted 1,535 people in 451 households. The 2016 census measured the population of the village as 1,073 people in 340 households.
