= Nilavareh-ye Sofla =

Village in Kermanshah, Iran

Nilavareh-ye Sofla نيلاوره سفلي
- Village
- Location within Iran
- Coordinates: 34°33′58″N 46°33′47″E
- Country: Iran
- Province: Kermanshah
- County: Kermanshah
- Bakhsh: Kuzaran
- Rural District: Sanjabi

Population (2006)
  - Total: 186
- Time zone: UTC+3:30 (IRST)
  - Summer (DST): UTC+4:30 (IRDT)

Nilavareh-ye Sofla (Persian: نيلاوره سفلي, also Romanized as Nīlāvareh-ye Soflá; also known as Nīlāvareh and Nīlawa) is a village in Sanjabi Rural District, Kuzaran District, Kermanshah County, Kermanshah Province, Iran. At the 2006 census, its population was 186, in 36 families.
