= Hasanijeh =

Village in Isfahan province, Iran

Hasnijeh Persian: هسنيجه
- Village
- Location within Iran
- Coordinates: 33°03′01″N 51°01′57″E
- Country: Iran
- Province: Isfahan
- County: Najafabad
- District: Mehrdasht
- Rural District: Hoseynabad

Population (2016)
  - Total: 239
- Time zone: UTC+3:30 (IRST)

Hasanijeh (Persian: هسنيجه) (Note: Also romanized as Ḩasnījeh, Hosnijeh and Ḩosnījeh; also known as Ḩoseynī, Ḩoseynjeh, Ḩosynī, Husaini, and Husni) is a village in Hoseynabad Rural District (Note: Formerly Arabestan-e Olya Rural District) of Mehrdasht District in Najafabad County, Isfahan province, Iran, serving as capital of the district.

== Demographics ==
=== Population ===
At the time of the 2006 National Census, the village's population was 428 in 133 households. The following census in 2011 counted 369 people in 124 households. The 2016 census measured the population of the village as 239 people in 79 households.
