= Khvorneh-ye Olya =

Khvorneh-ye Olya خورنه عليا
- Village
- Location within Iran
- Coordinates: 34°31′03″N 46°37′55″E
- Country: Iran
- Province: Kermanshah
- County: Kermanshah
- Bakhsh: Kuzaran
- Rural District: Sanjabi

Population (2006)
  - Total: 303
- Time zone: UTC+3:30 (IRST)
  - Summer (DST): UTC+4:30 (IRDT)

Khvorneh-ye Olya (Persian: خورنه عليا, also Romanized as Khvorneh-ye ‘Olyā and Khūrneh-ye ‘Olyā) is a village in Sanjabi Rural District, Kuzaran District, Kermanshah County, Kermanshah Province, Iran. At the 2006 census, its population was 303, in 59 families.
