= Milkeh-ye Buchan =

Milkeh-ye Buchan ميلكه بوچان
- Village
- Location within Iran
- Coordinates: 34°21′09″N 46°36′27″E
- Country: Iran
- Province: Kermanshah
- County: Kermanshah
- Bakhsh: Kuzaran
- Rural District: Haft Ashiyan

Population (2006)
  - Total: 113
- Time zone: UTC+3:30 (IRST)
  - Summer (DST): UTC+4:30 (IRDT)

Milkeh-ye Buchan (Persian: ميلكه بوچان, also Romanized as Mīlkeh-ye Būchān; also known as Mīlekeh, Mīlekeh-ye Pūchān, Mīlgeh-e Būchān, Mīlkeh-ye Pūchān, Millehgāh, and Milleh Gāwāna) is a village in Haft Ashiyan Rural District, Kuzaran District, Kermanshah County, Kermanshah Province, Iran. At the 2006 census, its population was 113, in 29 families.
