= Mansoor Yaghoti =

Mansoor Yaghouti
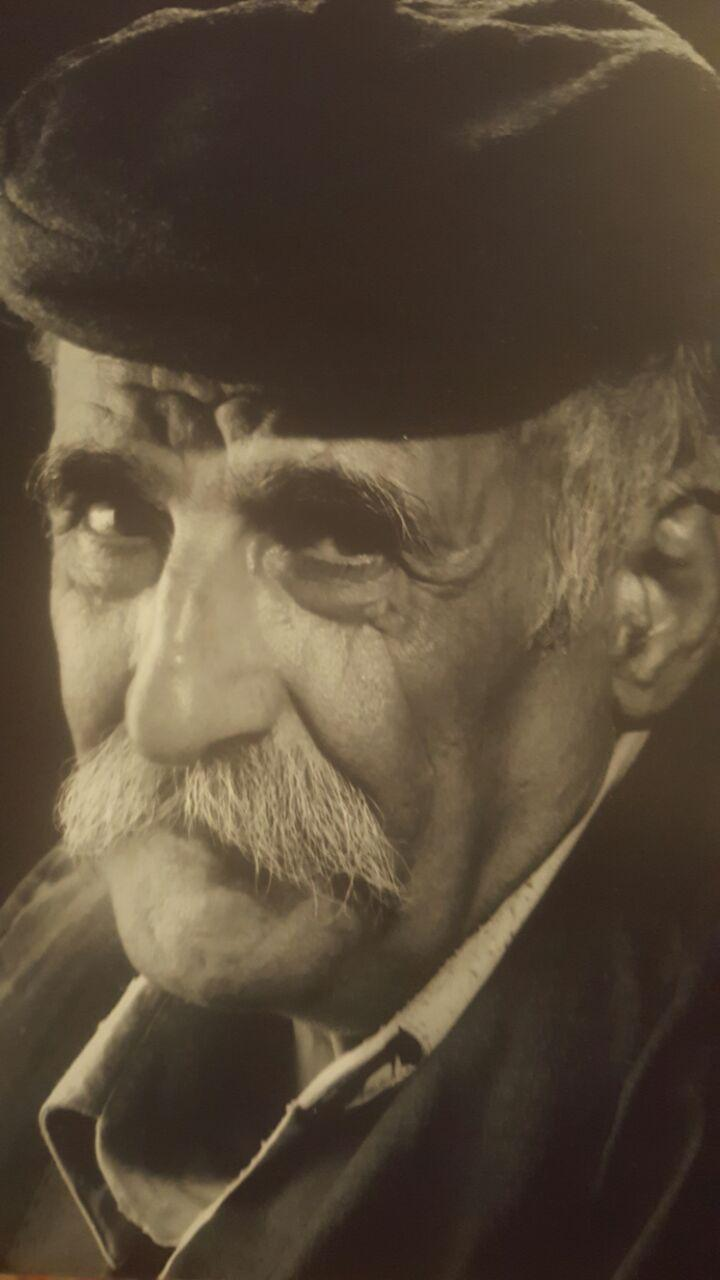
- Born: 5 March 1949; Kiveh Nan, Sonqor County, Kermanshah Province, Iran
- Died: 29 December 2024 (aged 75); Kermanshah, Iran
- Occupation: Writer
- Writing career
- Genres: Novel, short story, biography, etc
- Notable works: Sal-ha-ye Abri (Cloudy Years) Zakhm (The Wound), 1972; Gol-Khas, 1971; Koodaki-ye Man (My Childhood), 1974; Cheraghi Bar Faraz Madyan-Kuh (A Lamp Over Madyan Mountain), 1976; Akhgari dar Meh (Fire in the Mist), 1995
- Notable awards: Best Book of the Year award of the Iranian Children's Book Council for Mardane Farda 2014
- Literary movement: Modernism, Realism, Socialism

Mansoor Yaghouti (Persian: منصور یاقوتی; March 5, 1949 – December 29, 2024) was an Iranian short story writer, poet, and literary critic. He created significant works in Persian short stories and novels and is considered one of the prominent figures among the writers of the 1960s and 1970s in Iran. He was also one of the leading figures of rural literature in the 1970s and a follower of the literary style of Samad Behrangi.

== Early life and education ==
Mansoor Yaghouti was born on March 5, 1949, in the Kurdish-speaking village of Kiveh Nan, in Sonqor County, Kermanshah Province. After his family moved to the city of Kermanshah when he was seven, he attended Dariush Elementary School and later Kazazi High School, where he graduated with a diploma in literature. Yaghouti worked as a teacher in rural areas of Kermanshah as part of the Sepah-e Danesh (literacy corps) before joining the Ministry of Education in 1971. After five years of teaching in rural areas, he began working as a teacher in the city of Kermanshah.

== Political engagement and imprisonment ==
Yaghouti was first arrested in 1967 while studying at Kazazi High School. He was arrested again in 1977 during the martial law period under the government of Prime Minister Amir-Abbas Hoveyda. He was imprisoned during the Shah’s regime and later held after the 1979 Revolution. He faced political persecution due to his activities and connections with political groups and spent several years in hiding. He was arrested again in 1984, transferred to Dizelabad Prison in Kermanshah, and remained there for five years.

== Death ==
Mansoor Yaghouti died on December 29, 2024, at his home in Kermanshah, after a period of illness.

== Literary style and contributions ==
Yaghouti was known for his concise, direct writing style, which led Abbas Maroufi to call him “the Chekhov of Iran." His works frequently depicted rural life and social issues, reflecting his deep connection to his roots and his commitment to highlighting the struggles of the common people.

== Major works ==
Yaghouti authored several short story collections, novels, and poetry volumes. His notable works include:

Zakhm (The Wound), 1972 Gol-Khas, 1971 Koodaki-ye Man (My Childhood), 1974 Cheraghi Bar Faraz Madyan-Kuh (A Lamp Over Madyan Mountain), 1976 Afsaaneh-ye Sirang (The Legend of Sirang), 1979 Tusha-ye Parande-ye Gharib Zagaras (The Migrant Bird of Zagros), 1982 Mardane Farda (Men of Tomorrow), 1977 Sherekat-ye Koodak va Nojavan (The Company of Children and Youth), 1993 Mourning in the Mist (Akbari dar Mah), 1995 He also wrote poetry collections such as Mah-o Porchin (Moon and Tapestry) and Akghari dar Mah (Ashes in the Mist).

== Awards ==
Yaghouti received the prestigious "Best Book of the Year" award from the Iranian Children's Book Council for his collection Mardane Farda.

== Legacy ==
Yaghouti’s literary impact extended beyond his written works. He became a symbol of the struggles of intellectuals under authoritarian regimes, using his writings to voice social issues while portraying the daily lives of marginalized communities. His dedication to documenting Kurdish folklore and culture contributed to the preservation of regional heritage.

== Adaptations ==
Parts of his novel Cheraghi Bar Faraz Madyan-Kuh (A Lamp Over Madyan Mountain) were adapted into the film Dada (1982), directed by Iraj Ghaderi, though attempts to fully adapt the novel into a film were thwarted due to financial issues.
