= Qaleh Gelineh-ye Sofla =

Village in Kermanshah, Iran

Qaleh Gelineh-ye Sofla قلعه گلينه سفلي
- Village
- Location within Iran
- Coordinates: 34°29′07″N 46°41′52″E
- Country: Iran
- Province: Kermanshah
- County: Kermanshah
- Bakhsh: Kuzaran
- Rural District: Sanjabi

Population (2006)
  - Total: 185
- Time zone: UTC+3:30 (IRST)
  - Summer (DST): UTC+4:30 (IRDT)

Qaleh Gelineh-ye Sofla (Persian: قلعه گلينه سفلي, also Romanized as Qal‘eh Gelīneh-ye Soflá, Qal‘eh Galīneh-ye Soflá, and Qal‘eh-ye Galīneh-ye Soflá; also known as Kaleh Kharagīnah, Qal‘eh Gelīneh-ye Pā’īn, and Qal‘eh-ye Kharagīneh) is a village in Sanjabi Rural District, Kuzaran District, Kermanshah County, Kermanshah Province, Iran. At the 2006 census, its population was 185, in 45 families.
