= Khvorneh-ye Sofla =

Village in Kermanshah, Iran

Khvorneh-ye Sofla خورنه سفلي
- Village
- Location within Iran
- Coordinates: 34°31′42″N 46°39′18″E
- Country: Iran
- Province: Kermanshah
- County: Kermanshah
- Bakhsh: Kuzaran
- Rural District: Sanjabi

Population (2006)
  - Total: 215
- Time zone: UTC+3:30 (IRST)
  - Summer (DST): UTC+4:30 (IRDT)

Khvorneh-ye Sofla (Persian: خورنه سفلي, also Romanized as Khvorneh-ye Soflá and Khūrneh-ye Soflá) is a village in Sanjabi Rural District, Kuzaran District, Kermanshah County, Kermanshah Province, Iran. At the 2006 census, its population was 215, in 50 families.
