= Nilavareh-ye Olya =

Nilavareh-ye Olya نيلاوره عليا
- Village
- Location within Iran
- Coordinates: 34°35′22″N 46°31′05″E
- Country: Iran
- Province: Kermanshah
- County: Kermanshah
- Bakhsh: Kuzaran
- Rural District: Sanjabi

Population (2006)
  - Total: 74
- Time zone: UTC+3:30 (IRST)
  - Summer (DST): UTC+4:30 (IRDT)

Nilavareh-ye Olya (Persian: نيلاوره عليا, also Romanized as Nīlāvareh-ye ‘Olyā; also known as Nīlaura and Nīlāvareh) is a village in Sanjabi Rural District, Kuzaran District, Kermanshah County, Kermanshah Province, Iran. At the 2006 census, its population was 74, in 12 families.
