= Dar Gol-e Teymaz =

Dar Gol-e Teymaz دارگل طيمز
- Village
- Location within Iran
- Coordinates: 34°23′10″N 46°33′44″E
- Country: Iran
- Province: Kermanshah
- County: Kermanshah
- Bakhsh: Kuzaran
- Rural District: Haft Ashiyan

Population (2006)
  - Total: 109
- Time zone: UTC+3:30 (IRST)
  - Summer (DST): UTC+4:30 (IRDT)

Dar Gol-e Teymaz (Persian: دارگل طيمز, also Romanized as Dār Gol-e Teymaz) is a village in Haft Ashiyan Rural District, Kuzaran District, Kermanshah County, Kermanshah Province, Iran. At the 2006 census, its population was 109, in 23 families.
