= Marivani-ye Kakiha =

Marivani-ye Kakiha مريواني كاكيها
- Village
- Location within Iran
- Coordinates: 34°25′25″N 46°36′04″E
- Country: Iran
- Province: Kermanshah
- County: Kermanshah
- Bakhsh: Kuzaran
- Rural District: Sanjabi

Population (2006)
  - Total: 103
- Time zone: UTC+3:30 (IRST)
  - Summer (DST): UTC+4:30 (IRDT)

Marivani-ye Kakiha (Persian: مريواني كاكيها, also Romanized as Marīvānī-ye Kakīhā; also known as Marīvān-e Kahīhā, Marīvān-e Kākīhā, Marīvānī, Mariwāni, and Meriwāni) is a village in Sanjabi Rural District, Kuzaran District, Kermanshah County, Kermanshah Province, Iran. At the 2006 census, its population was 103, in 23 families.
