= Agah-e Sofla =

Agah-e Sofla اگاه سفلي
- Village
- Location within Iran
- Coordinates: 34°54′06″N 47°20′17″E
- Country: Iran
- Province: Kermanshah
- County: Sonqor
- Bakhsh: Kolyai
- Rural District: Kivanat

Population (2006)
  - Total: 106
- Time zone: UTC+3:30 (IRST)
  - Summer (DST): UTC+4:30 (IRDT)

Agah-e Sofla (Persian: اگاه سفلي, also Romanized as Āgāh-e Soflá) is a village in Kivanat Rural District, Kolyai District, Sonqor County, Kermanshah Province, Iran. At the 2006 census, its population was 106, in 29 families.
