= Dar Gol-e Seyyed Hasan =

Village in Kermanshah, Iran

Dar Gol-e Seyyed Hasan دارگل سيدحسن
- Village
- Location within Iran
- Coordinates: 34°22′46″N 46°32′40″E
- Country: Iran
- Province: Kermanshah
- County: Kermanshah
- Bakhsh: Kuzaran
- Rural District: Haft Ashiyan

Population (2006)
  - Total: 43
- Time zone: UTC+3:30 (IRST)
  - Summer (DST): UTC+4:30 (IRDT)

Dar Gol-e Seyyed Hasan (Persian: دارگل سيدحسن, also Romanized as Dār Gol-e Seyyed Ḩasan, Dārgol-e Seyyed Ḩasan, and Dārgol Seyyed Ḩasan; also known as Dārgol, Dār Gol-e Seyyed Ḩoseyn, and Dārgul Saiyid Hasan) is a village in Haft Ashiyan Rural District, Kuzaran District, Kermanshah County, Kermanshah Province, Iran. At the 2006 census, its population was 43, in 10 families.
