= Chegeni-ye Olya =

Chegeni-ye Olya چگني عليا
- Village
- Location within Iran
- Coordinates: 34°30′19″N 46°38′40″E
- Country: Iran
- Province: Kermanshah
- County: Kermanshah
- Bakhsh: Kuzaran
- Rural District: Sanjabi

Population (2006)
  - Total: 140
- Time zone: UTC+3:30 (IRST)
  - Summer (DST): UTC+4:30 (IRDT)

Chegeni-ye Olya (Persian: چگني عليا, also Romanized as Chegenī-ye 'Olyā; also known as Chegīnī) is a village in Sanjabi Rural District, Kuzaran District, Kermanshah County, Kermanshah province, Iran. At the 2006 census, its population was 140, with 34 families.
