= Gol Darreh-ye Sofla =

Village in Kermanshah, Iran

Gol Darreh-ye Sofla گلدره سفلي
- Village
- Location within Iran
- Coordinates: 34°24′59″N 46°33′18″E
- Country: Iran
- Province: Kermanshah
- County: Kermanshah
- Bakhsh: Kuzaran
- Rural District: Sanjabi

Population (2006)
  - Total: 32
- Time zone: UTC+3:30 (IRST)
  - Summer (DST): UTC+4:30 (IRDT)

Gol Darreh-ye Sofla (Persian: گلدره سفلي, also Romanized as Gol Darreh-ye Soflá) is a village in Sanjabi Rural District, Kuzaran District, Kermanshah County, Kermanshah Province, Iran. At the 2006 census, its population was 32, in 7 families.
