= Zaghan-e Olya =

Zaghan-e Olya زاغان عليا
- Village
- Location within Iran
- Coordinates: 35°02′39″N 47°21′57″E
- Country: Iran
- Province: Kermanshah
- County: Sonqor
- Bakhsh: Kolyai
- Rural District: Agahan

Population (2006)
  - Total: 267
- Time zone: UTC+3:30 (IRST)
  - Summer (DST): UTC+4:30 (IRDT)

Zaghan-e Olya (Persian: زاغان عليا, also Romanized as Zāghān-e ‘Olyā; also known as Zāghān-e Bālā and Zākhān-e Bālā) is a village in Agahan Rural District, Kolyai District, Sonqor County, Kermanshah Province, Iran. At the 2006 census, its population was 267, in 64 families.
