= Gandomban-e Olya =

Gandomban-e Olya گندمبان عليا
- Village
- Location within Iran
- Coordinates: 34°31′33″N 46°44′08″E
- Country: Iran
- Province: Kermanshah
- County: Kermanshah
- Bakhsh: Kuzaran
- Rural District: Sanjabi

Population (2006)
  - Total: 23
- Time zone: UTC+3:30 (IRST)
  - Summer (DST): UTC+4:30 (IRDT)

Gandomban-e Olya (Persian: گندمبان عليا, also Romanized as Gandombān-e ‘Olyā) is a village in Sanjabi Rural District, Kuzaran District, Kermanshah County, Kermanshah Province, Iran. At the 2006 census, its population was 23, in 7 families.
