= Ali Ahmad Domab Castle =

Castle in Isfahan Province, Iran

- قلعه علی احمد دماب
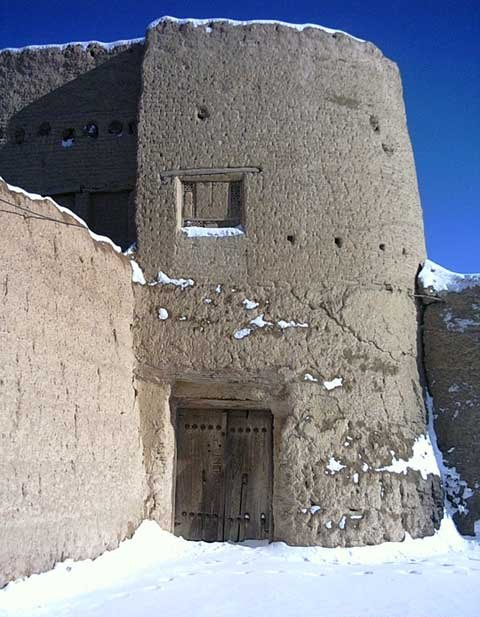

- Location within Iran

General information
- Type: Castle
- Location: Najafabad County, Iran
- Coordinates: 33.12264°N 50.7175°E

Ali Ahmad Domab Castle (Persian: قلعه علی احمد دماب) is a historical castle located in Najafabad County in Isfahan Province, The longevity of this fortress dates back to the Qajar dynasty.
