= Lenjab =

Village in Kermanshah province, Iran

Lenjab Persian: لنجاب
- Village
- Location within Iran
- Coordinates: 34°52′32″N 47°17′00″E
- Country: Iran
- Province: Kermanshah
- County: Sonqor
- District: Kolyai
- Rural District: Kivananat

Population (2016)
  - Total: 327
- Time zone: UTC+3:30 (IRST)

Lenjab (Persian: لنجاب) (Note: Also romanized as Lanjāb and Lenjāb) is a village in Kivananat Rural District of Kolyai District, Sonqor County, Kermanshah province, Iran.

== Demographics ==
=== Population ===
At the time of the 2006 National Census, the village's population was 239 in 53 households. The following census in 2011 counted 578 people in 72 households. The 2016 census measured the population of the village as 327 people in 43 households. It was the most populous village in its rural district.
