= Azreh-ye Mohammad Khan =

Azreh-ye Mohammad Khan ازره محمدخان
- Village
- Location within Iran
- Coordinates: 34°26′08″N 46°39′09″E
- Country: Iran
- Province: Kermanshah
- County: Kermanshah
- Bakhsh: Kuzaran
- Rural District: Sanjabi

Population (2006)
  - Total: 48
- Time zone: UTC+3:30 (IRST)
  - Summer (DST): UTC+4:30 (IRDT)

Azreh-ye Mohammad Khan (Persian: ازره محمدخان, also Romanized as Azreh-ye Moḩammad Khān) is a village in Sanjabi Rural District, Kuzaran District, Kermanshah County, Kermanshah Province, Iran. At the 2006 census, its population was 48, in 9 families.
