= Qaleh Gelineh-ye Olya =

Qaleh Gelineh-ye Olya قلعه گلينه عليا
- Village
- Location within Iran
- Coordinates: 34°28′53″N 46°42′15″E
- Country: Iran
- Province: Kermanshah
- County: Kermanshah
- Bakhsh: Kuzaran
- Rural District: Sanjabi

Population (2006)
  - Total: 79
- Time zone: UTC+3:30 (IRST)
  - Summer (DST): UTC+4:30 (IRDT)

Qaleh Gelineh-ye Olya (Persian: قلعه گلينه عليا, also Romanized as Qal‘eh Gelīneh-ye ‘Olyā and Qal‘eh-ye Galīneh-ye ‘Olyā; also known as Qal‘eh Gelīneh-ye Bālā) is a village in Sanjabi Rural District, Kuzaran District, Kermanshah County, Kermanshah Province, Iran. At the 2006 census, its population was 79, in 20 families.
