= Sadeqiyeh Rural District =

Rural district in Isfahan province, Iran

Sadeqiyeh Rural District Persian: دهستان صادقيه
- Rural District
- Location within Iran
- Coordinates: 32°38′N 51°16′E
- Country: Iran
- Province: Isfahan
- County: Najafabad
- District: Central
- Established: 1987
- Capital: Hajjiabad

Population (2016)
  - Total: 11,666
- Time zone: UTC+3:30 (IRST)

Sadeqiyeh Rural District (Persian: دهستان صادقيه) is in the Central District of Najafabad County, Isfahan province, Iran. Its capital is the village of Hajjiabad.

== Demographics ==
=== Population ===
At the time of the 2006 National Census, the rural district's population was 7,579 in 2,079 households. There were 9,753 inhabitants in 2,955 households at the following census of 2011. The 2016 census measured the population of the rural district as 11,666 in 3,554 households. The most populous of its 19 villages was Jalalabad, with 4,056 people.

=== Other villages in the rural district ===
- Hemmatabad
- Nehzatabad
