= Alavijeh =

City in Isfahan province, Iran

Alavijeh Persian: علويجه
- City
- Location within Iran
- Coordinates: 33°03′19″N 51°04′57″E
- Country: Iran
- Province: Isfahan
- County: Najafabad
- District: Mehrdasht

Population (2016)
  - Total: 8,067
- Time zone: UTC+3:30 (IRST)
- Area code: 0314241
- Website: www.alavijeh.ir

Alavijeh (Persian: علويجه) (Note: Also romanized as ‘Alavījeh; also known as ‘Alavi) is a city in Mehrdasht District of Najafabad County, Isfahan province, Iran. The city is about 70 kilometres (43 mi) northwest of Isfahan. Alavijeh has an agricultural market for some products such as peaches, grapes, berries, and almonds, among others.

== Demographics ==
=== Population ===
At the time of the 2006 National Census, the city's population was 5,692 in 1,696 households. The following census in 2011 counted 7,526 people in 2,129 households. The 2016 census measured the population of the city as 8,067 people in 2,618 households.
