= Mehmed Hasib Pasha =

Ottoman Empire politician

Mehmed Hasib Pasha (Ottoman Turkish: محمد حسيب پاشا Mehmet Hasip Paşa, d. c. 24 March 1870) was an Ottoman statesman who served five times as Minister of Evkaf, three times as Minister of the Privy Purse, and twice as Minister of Finance. He was head of the Meclis-i Vala in 1840–1841, and in 1848–1850 he was Vali of the Hejaz and Shaykh al-Haram at Mecca.

== Biography ==
He was the son of Mehmed Emin Efendi, who died in 1220 AH (1805/1806). He was a scribe in the Ministry of the Sultan's Treasury (hazine-i hassa, also translated as "the Privy Purse") during the construction of the Nusretiye Mosque. In 1241 AH (1825/1826) he was promoted to the rank of hacegan and appointed topçular katibi. Later he was appointed kapı kethüdası of Baghdad.

Hasib was appointed as the first nazir (minister) of the newly created Ministry of Evkaf in Şaban 1250 AH (December 1834). (Note: Mehmed Süreyya writes 20 Şaban (c. 22 December), Barnes writes 8 Şaban (c. 10 December)) On 28 Ramazan 1252 AH (c. 6 January 1837) he was promoted to the rank of vezir and appointed Minister of the Privy Purse. In Muharram 1254 AH (April 1838) (Note: Mehmed Süreyya writes 10 Muharrem (c. 6 April), Barnes writes 20 Muharrem (c. 16 April)) Hasib was concurrently appointed nazir of the Evkaf Ministry, which in that year had been combined with the Ministry of the Imperial Arsenal (tophan-i amire).

In Receb 1255 AH (September/October 1839) following the succession of Abdülmecid to the throne, Hasib was discharged and appointed Vali of Salonica. He was dismissed from the governorship a few months later, in Zilhicce (February/March 1840). From Rebiyülahir 1256 AH (June 1840) he served as head of the Meclis-i Vala (Supreme Council) until his dismissal on 5 Muharrem 1257 AH (c. 27 February 1841). In mid-1258 AH (1842) he was appointed Inspector General (müfettişi) for Anatolia. One month later he was again made a member of the Meclis-i Vala.

On 23 Receb 1260 (c. 8 August 1844) he was appointed Minister of Evkaf a third time.

In Şevval 1264 AH (September 1848) he was appointed Vali of Jeddah to replace Mehmet Şerif Pasha. He arrived in the beginning of Muharrem 1265 AH (November 1848) and was dismissed in 1850. Between 1850 and 1861 he was appointed successively to several posts, as listed below:

- Minister of the Privy Purse (2nd time) - Receb 1266 AH (May/June 1850)
- Minister of Evkaf (4th time) - Zilhicce 1270 AH (August/September 1854)
- Minister of Finance - Zilhicce 1273 AH (July/August 1857)
- Minister of Evkaf (5th time) - Ramazan 1274 (April/May 1858)
- Minister of Finance (2nd time) - Receb 1275 (February/March 1859)
- Member of the Mecalis-i Aliye (High Councils) - Zilkade 1276 AH (May/June 1860)
- Minister of the Privy Purse (3rd time) - Şevval 1277 AH (April/May 1861) to Muharrem 1278 (July/August 1861)

He retired on pension in 1282 AH (1865/1866). In Zilhicce 1286 AH he was given the post of Shaykh al-Haram (şeyhülharem), but he died only a few days later on 21 Zilhicce (c. 24 March 1870)

Political offices
Preceded by Mehmet Şerif Pasha	Vali of Jeddah and Habesh; 1845–1848	Succeeded by Agah Pasha
