= Goldasht =

City in Isfahan province, Iran

Goldasht Persian: گلدشت
- City
- Location within Iran
- Coordinates: 32°37′28″N 51°26′18″E
- Country: Iran
- Province: Isfahan
- County: Najafabad
- District: Central
- Established as a city: 1992

Population (2016)
  - Total: 25,235
- Time zone: UTC+3:30 (IRST)

Goldasht (Persian: گلدشت) (Note: Formerly, Qaleh Shah (قلعه شاه), also romanized as Qal‘eh Shāh, Qal‘eh-ye Shāh; also known as Ghalehshah (English: Castle of the King); and also known after the Iranian Revolution as Shahrak-e Emam (شهرک امام) ("Village of the Emam"),) is a city in the Central District of Najafabad County, Isfahan province, Iran. As the village of Shahrak-e Emam, it was the capital of Safayyeh Rural District until its capital was transferred to the city of Kahrizsang. Shahrak-e Emam was converted to a city in 1992 and renamed Goldasht.

== Demographics ==
=== Population ===
At the time of the 2006 National Census, the city's population was 22,693 in 5,830 households. The following census in 2011 counted 23,192 people in 6,686 households. The 2016 census measured the population of the city as 25,235 people in 7,582 households.
