= Tatar Osman Pasha =

Tatar Osman Pasha (Ottoman Turkish: تاتار عثمان پاشا Tatar Osman Paşa; d. 25 June 1845) was an Ottoman statesman of Crimean Tatar origin who served as Vali of Jeddah Eyalet and Shaykh of the Meccan Haram from 1841 to 1845.

Serving in the regular Nizamiye army, he was promoted to the rank of binbashi in Shawwal 1241 AH (May/June 1826), then later to miralay. In 1251 AH (1835/1836) he was promoted to mirliva. In 1252 AH (1836/1837) he was promoted to ferik and served in Antalya.

On 25 Receb 1253 AH (c. 26 October 1837) he was made a vezir and appointed Shaykh of the Medinan Haram. On 2 Zilhicce 1256 AH (c. 26 January 1841) he was appointed Vali of Jeddah and Shaykh of the Meccan Haram. He died in Jeddah on 25 June 1845 and was buried there.

Political offices
Preceded by Ali Rıza Pasha	Vali of Jeddah and Habesh; 1841–1845	Succeeded by Mehmet Şerif Pasha
