= Haft Ashiyan, Kermanshah =

Village in Kermanshah province, Iran

Haft Ashiyan Persian: هفت اشيان
- Village
- Location within Iran
- Coordinates: 34°21′35″N 46°34′27″E
- Country: Iran
- Province: Kermanshah
- County: Kermanshah
- District: Kuzaran
- Rural District: Haft Ashiyan

Population (2016)
  - Total: 113
- Time zone: UTC+3:30 (IRST)

Haft Ashiyan (Persian: هفت اشيان) (Note: Also romanized as Haft Āshīān and Haft Āshīyān; also known as Haft Āshīān-e Şoḩbat) is a village in, and the capital of, Haft Ashiyan Rural District of Kuzaran District, Kermanshah County, Kermanshah province, Iran.

== Demographics ==
=== Population ===
At the time of the 2006 National Census, the village's population was 155 in 42 households. The following census in 2011 counted 144 people in 40 households. The 2016 census measured the population of the village as 113 people in 36 households. It was the most populous village in its rural district.
