= Eshen Rural District =

Rural district in Isfahan province, Iran

Eshen Rural District Persian: دهستان اشن
- Rural District
- Location within Iran
- Coordinates: 33°09′N 50°46′E
- Country: Iran
- Province: Isfahan
- County: Najafabad
- District: Mehrdasht
- Established: 1987
- Capital: Eshen

Population (2016)
  - Total: 4,902
- Time zone: UTC+3:30 (IRST)

Eshen Rural District (Persian: دهستان اشن) (Note: Formerly Arabestan-e Olya Rural District (دهستان عربستان علیا)) is in Mehrdasht District of Najafabad County, Isfahan province, Iran. Its capital is the village of Eshen.

== Demographics ==
=== Population ===
At the time of the 2006 National Census, the rural district's population was 5,382 in 1,363 households. There were 5,439 inhabitants in 1,733 households at the following census of 2011. The 2016 census measured the population of the rural district as 4,902 in 1,615 households. The most populous of its 11 villages was Eshen, with 2,748 people.

=== Other villages in the rural district ===
- Domab
- Gol Darreh
- Kheyrabad
- Kuy-e Lotf
