= Kahrizsang =

City in Isfahan province, Iran

Kahrizsang Persian: كهريزسنگ
- City
- Location within Iran
- Coordinates: 32°37′43″N 51°28′54″E
- Country: Iran
- Province: Isfahan
- County: Najafabad
- District: Central
- Established as a city: 2003

Population (2016)
  - Total: 10,442
- Time zone: UTC+3:30 (IRST)

Kahrizsang (Persian: كهريزسنگ) (Note: Also romanized as Kahriz Sang and Kahrīz Sang; also known as ‘Alīābād-e Kahrīz Sang; formerly Şafā’īyeh) is a city in the Central District of Najafabad County, Isfahan province, Iran, serving as the administrative center for Safayyeh Rural District. The previous capital of the rural district was the village of Shahrak-e Emam, now the city of Goldasht. The village of Kahrizsang was converted to a city in 2003..

== Demographics ==
=== Population ===
At the time of the 2006 National Census, the city's population was 8,267 in 2,169 households. The following census in 2011 counted 9,264 people in 2,658 households. The 2016 census measured the population of the city as 10,442 people in 3,065 households.
