= Agahi =

Agahi may refer to:

- Agahi (newspaper), published by the Roman Catholic Archdiocese of Karachi, Pakistan
- Agahi Award, Pakistani journalism award
- Iranian Police Criminal Investigation Department (Police Āgāhi)
- Muhammad Riza Agahi (1809–1874), 19th-century Chagatai language writer

== See also ==
- Agah (disambiguation)
