= Agah-e Olya =

Village in Kermanshah province, Iran

Agah-e Olya Persian: اگاه عليا
- Village
- Location within Iran
- Coordinates: 34°54′43″N 47°21′55″E
- Country: Iran
- Province: Kermanshah
- County: Sonqor
- District: Kolyai
- Rural District: Agahan

Population (2016)
  - Total: 320
- Time zone: UTC+3:30 (IRST)

Agah-e Olya (Persian: اگاه عليا) (Note: Also romanized as Āgāh-e ‘Olyā; also known as Āgāh, Āgāh Kolyā’ī, Āgāh-e Bālā, Āgha, and Āqā) is a village in, and the capital of, Agahan Rural District of Kolyai District, Sonqor County, Kermanshah province, Iran.

== Demographics ==
=== Population ===
At the time of the 2006 National Census, the village's population was 383 in 95 households. The following census in 2011 counted 359 people in 114 households. The 2016 census measured the population of the village as 320 people in 102 households.
