= Kiveh Nan =

Village in Kermanshah province, Iran

Kiveh Nan Persian: کیوه‌نان
- Village
- Location within Iran
- Coordinates: 34°49′36″N 47°11′32″E
- Country: Iran
- Province: Kermanshah
- County: Sonqor
- District: Kolyai
- Rural District: Kivananat

Population (2016)
  - Total: 238
- Time zone: UTC+3:30 (IRST)

Kiveh Nan (Persian: کیوه‌نان) (Note: Also romanized as Keyveh Nān and Kīveh Nān; also known as Kīvanān, Kīvenān, and Kīyānān) is a village in, and the capital of, Kivananat Rural District of Kolyai District, Sonqor County, Kermanshah province, Iran.

== Demographics ==
=== Population ===
At the time of the 2006 National Census, the village's population was 372 in 87 households. The following census in 2011 counted 289 people in 101 households. The 2016 census measured the population of the village as 238 people in 82 households.
