= Safayyeh Rural District =

Rural district in Isfahan province, Iran

Safayyeh Rural District Persian: دهستان صفائيه
- Rural District
- Location within Iran
- Coordinates: 32°45′N 51°20′E
- Country: Iran
- Province: Isfahan
- County: Najafabad
- District: Central
- Established: 1987
- Capital: Kahrizsang

Population (2016)
  - Total: 405
- Time zone: UTC+3:30 (IRST)

Safayyeh Rural District (Persian: دهستان صفائيه) is in the Central District of Najafabad County, Isfahan province, Iran. It is administered from the city of Kahrizsang. The previous capital of the rural district was the village of Shahrak-e Emam, now the city of Goldasht.

== Demographics ==
=== Population ===
At the time of the 2006 National Census, the rural district's population was 921 in 268 households. There were 321 inhabitants in 107 households at the following census of 2011. The 2016 census measured the population of the rural district as 405 in 136 households. The most populous of its seven villages was Eslamabad, with 395 people.
