= Satar, Iran =

City in Kermanshah province, Iran

Satar Persian: سطر
- City
- Location within Iran
- Coordinates: 34°48′46″N 47°27′38″E
- Country: Iran
- Province: Kermanshah
- County: Sonqor
- District: Kolyai

Population (2016)
  - Total: 1,048
- Time zone: UTC+3:30 (IRST)

Satar (Persian: سطر) (Note: Also romanized as Saţar) is a city in, and the capital of, Kolyai District of Sonqor County, Kermanshah province, Iran. It also serves as the administrative center for Satar Rural District.

== Demographics ==
=== Population ===
At the time of the 2006 National Census, the city's population was 1,284 in 354 households. The following census in 2011 counted 1,227 people in 326 households. The 2016 census measured the population of the city as 1,048 people in 325 households.
