= Mehmet Şerif Pasha =

Mehmet Şerif Pasha (Ottoman Turkish: محمد شريف پاشا Mehmet Şerif Paşa; c. 1771 – c. November 1851) was an Ottoman civil servant who served as Vali of Jeddah Eyalet and Shaykh al-Haram of Mecca from 1845 to 1848.

In 1251 AH (1835/1836) he was promoted to rutbe-saniye (second grade civil rank) and appointed Mudir (chief treasurer) of the Haram in Medina. On 20 Ramazan 1257 AH (c. 5 November 1841) he was promoted to Shaykh al-Haram (şeyhülharem) there with the rank of vezir. In 1845 following the death of Osman Pasha he was appointed Vali of Jeddah and Shaykh al-Haram at Mecca (a position often held alongside the governorship) . He was dismissed in Şevval 1264 AH (August/September 1848). In Ramazan 1267 AH (July 1851) he was appointed Shaykh al-Haram in Medina a second time. He set off from Istanbul but did not reach Medina. He died at Yanbu in Muharrem 1268 AH (October/November 1851), around 80 years of age, and was buried there.

Political offices
Preceded by Tatar Osman Pasha	Vali of Jeddah and Habesh; 1845–1848	Succeeded by Mehmet Hasip Pasha
