= Hoseynabad Rural District (Najafabad County) =

Rural district in Isfahan province, Iran

Hoseynabad Rural District Persian: دهستان حسين آباد
- Rural District
- Location within Iran
- Coordinates: 33°03′N 51°07′E
- Country: Iran
- Province: Isfahan
- County: Najafabad
- District: Mehrdasht
- Established: 1987
- Capital: Hoseynabad

Population (2016)
  - Total: 4,687
- Time zone: UTC+3:30 (IRST)

Hoseynabad Rural District (Persian: دهستان حسين آباد) (Note: Formerly Arabestan-e Sofla Rural District (دهستان عربستان سفلی)) is in Mehrdasht District of Najafabad County, Isfahan province, Iran. Its capital is the village of Hoseynabad.

== Demographics ==
=== Population ===
At the time of the 2006 National Census, the rural district's population was 5,440 in 1,372 households. There were 5,220 inhabitants in 1,529 households at the following census of 2011. The 2016 census measured the population of the rural district as 4,687 in 1,444 households. The most populous of its 29 villages was Hoseynabad, with 3,087 people.

=== Other villages in the rural district ===
- Aliabad
- Hasanijeh
- Khundab
