= Agah (name) =

Agah is a Turkish masculine name. It is also used as a surname. Notable people with the name are as follows:

== Given name ==
- Agah Efendi (1832–1885), Ottoman civil servant
- Agah Oktay Güner (born 1937), Turkish journalist and politician
- Agah Pasha (birth of date unknown–1855), Ottoman politician

== Surname ==
- Ahmet Âgâh, known as Yahya Kemal Beyatlı (1884 – 1 November 1958), Turkish poet and politician
- Salman Agah (born 1972), American skateboarder
