= Kuzaran =

City in Kermanshah province, Iran

Kuzaran Persian: كوزران
- City
- Location within Iran
- Coordinates: 34°29′48″N 46°35′53″E
- Country: Iran
- Province: Kermanshah
- County: Kermanshah
- District: Kuzaran

Population (2016)
  - Total: 4,007
- Time zone: UTC+3:30 (IRST)

Kuzaran (Persian: كوزران) (Note: Also romanized as Kūzarān; also known as Kūzarān-e Sanjābī) is a city in, and the capital of, Kuzaran District of Kermanshah County, Kermanshah province, Iran. It also serves as the administrative center for Sanjabi Rural District. Kuzaran is home to the Kurdish Sanjâbi tribe.

== Demographics ==
=== Population ===
At the time of the 2006 National Census, the city's population was 3,759 in 810 households. The following census in 2011 counted 3,934 people in 1,035 households. The 2016 census measured the population of the city as 4,007 people in 1,140 households.
