= Haft Ashiyan, Sonqor =

Village in Kermanshah province, Iran

Haft Ashiyan Persian: هفت اشيان
- Village
- Location within Iran
- Coordinates: 34°58′04″N 47°27′28″E
- Country: Iran
- Province: Kermanshah
- County: Sonqor
- District: Kolyai
- Rural District: Agahan

Population (2016)
  - Total: 361
- Time zone: UTC+3:30 (IRST)

Haft Ashiyan (Persian: هفت اشيان) (Note: Also romanized as Haft Ashian and Haft Āshīān; also known as Haft Shīān, Haftāsān, and Hafteh Shīān) is a village in Agahan Rural District of Kolyai District, Sonqor County, Kermanshah province, Iran.

== Demographics ==
=== Population ===
At the time of the 2006 National Census, the village's population was 520 in 112 households. The following census in 2011 counted 428 people in 130 households. The 2016 census measured the population of the village as 361 people in 106 households. It was the most populous village in its rural district.
