= Dehaq =

City in Isfahan province, Iran

Dehaq Persian: دهق
- City
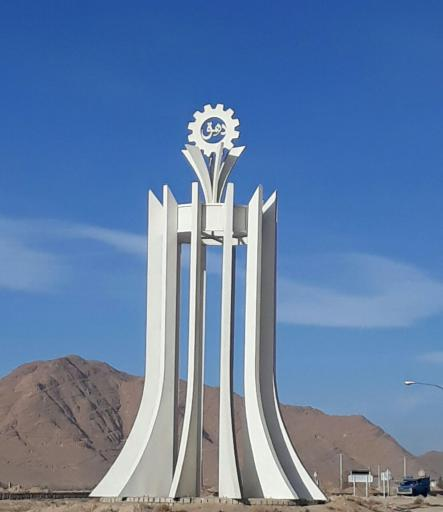
- Dehaq City Industry Square
- Etymology: Derived from Persian "دهک" (Dehak)
- Nicknames: City of Art and Industry
- Location of Dehaq in Iran
- Coordinates: 33°06′18″N 50°57′46″E
- Country: Iran
- Province: Isfahan
- County: Najafabad
- District: Mehrdasht
- City established: 1953

Government
  - Mayor: Hossein Khalili

Area
  - Total: 70 km^{2} (27 sq mi)
- Elevation: 1,958 m (6,424 ft)

Population (2016)
  - Total: 8,272
  - Density: 120/km^{2} (310/sq mi)
- Time zone: UTC+3:30 (IRST)
- Area code: (+98)031-4227

Dehaq (Persian: دهق) (Note: Also known as Dehagh) is a city in Mehrdasht District of Najafabad County, Isfahan province, Iran.

== Demographics ==
=== Population ===
At the time of the 2006 National Census, the city's population was 7,828 in 2,174 households. The following census in 2011 counted 7,710 people in 2,355 households. The 2016 census measured the population of the city as 8,272 people in 2,676 households.

== Flora ==
Flowers such as the African marigold, China aster, and common barberry are found in Dehaq.

== See also ==
- Najafabad County
- Mehrdasht District
