= Dar Gol =

Dar Gol درگل
- Village
- Location within Iran
- Coordinates: 26°23′32″N 58°27′34″E
- Country: Iran
- Province: Hormozgan
- County: Bashagard
- Bakhsh: Gafr and Parmon
- Rural District: Gafr and Parmon

Population (2006)
  - Total: 109
- Time zone: UTC+3:30 (IRST)
  - Summer (DST): UTC+4:30 (IRDT)

Dar Gol (Persian: درگل, also Romanized as Dar Gel) is a village in Gafr and Parmon Rural District, Gafr and Parmon District, Bashagard County, Hormozgan Province, Iran. At the 2006 census, its population was 109, in 23 families.
