= Najafabad =

City in Isfahan province, Iran

Najafabad Persian: نجف‌آباد
- City
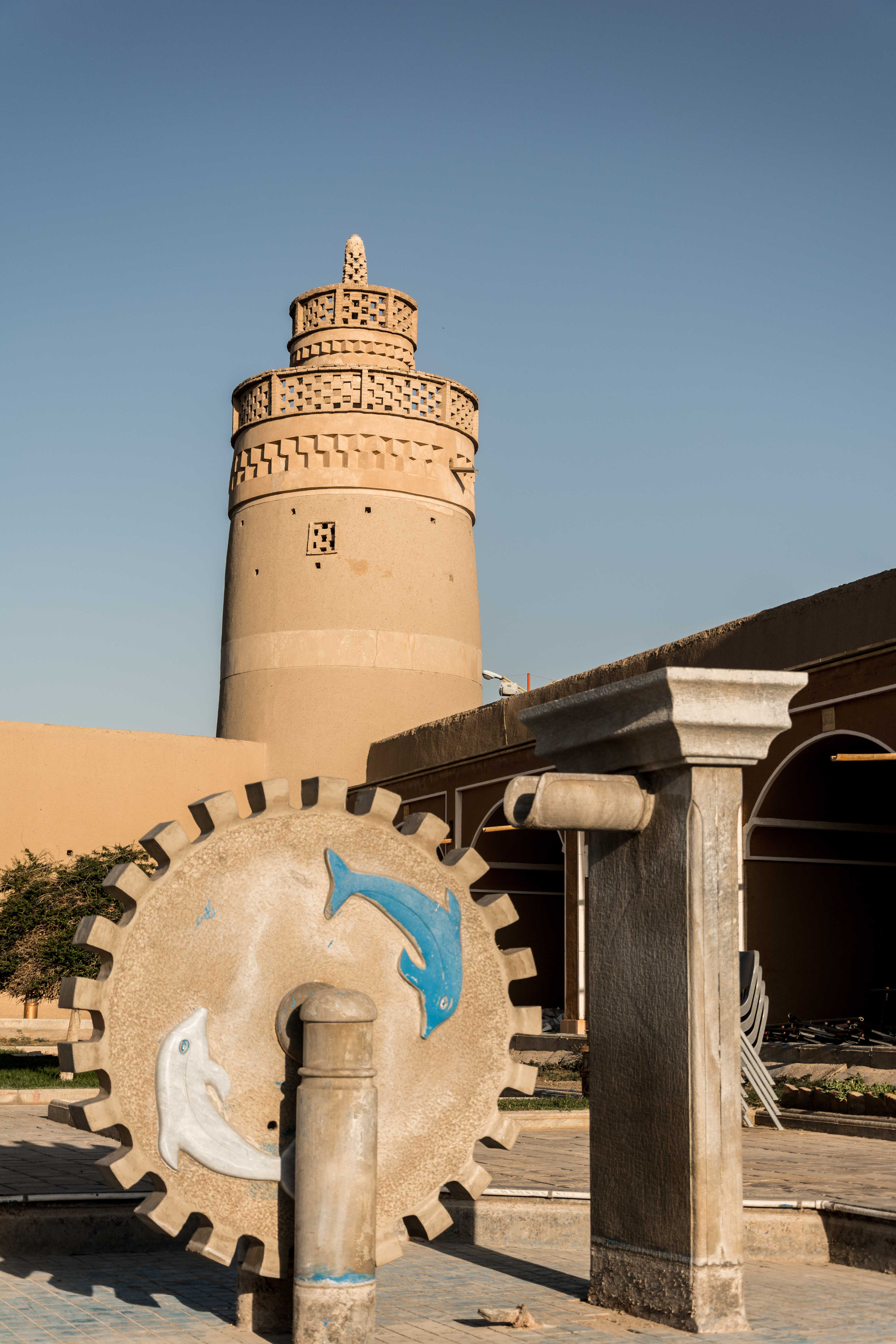
- Sheikhbahaei Fort

- Location within Iran
- Coordinates: 32°37′59″N 51°21′54″E
- Country: Iran
- Province: Isfahan
- County: Najafabad
- District: Central
- Established: 1613 A.D.

Government
  - Mayor: Dr. Mohammad Maghzi

Area
  - Total: 87.772 km^{2} (33.889 sq mi)

Population (2016)
  - Total: 235,281
  - Density: 2,680.6/km^{2} (6,942.7/sq mi)
- Time zone: UTC+3:30 (IRST)
- Area code: (+98)31(4)
- Website: www.najafabad.ir

Najafabad (Persian: نجف‌آباد; Persian pronunciation: [nædʒæfɒːˈbɒːd]) (Note: Also romanized as Najafābād) is a city in the Central District of Najafabad County, Isfahan province, Iran, serving as capital of both the county and the district.

Najafabad is west of Isfahan and is increasingly becoming a part of the Isfahan Metropolitan area. The city serves as a trade center for agricultural products in the region, and is noted for its pomegranates and almonds. One of the attractions of Najafabad is the "Arg-e Sheykh Bahaie", which has recently been repaired.

== Etymology ==
The area of modern day Najafabad was originally called Dahan (Persian: دهان). However, during the time of the Safavid Shah Abbas the Great, the Shah wanted to send a gift containing jewellery and coins to the Sanctuary of Imam Ali in the city of Najaf, Iraq, and (according to the legend) as the caravan of camels carrying the gift was traveling towards Najaf, it stopped at Dahan near the city of Isfahan and refused to move. Following this, Shaykh Baha al-Din relayed to Shah Abbas, that Imam Ali himself had manifested to him in a dream and ordered to use the gift to build in the area where the caravan had stopped. The Shah concurred, and thus the city developed and came to be known as Najaf Abad, or literally "City of Najaf."

== Demographics ==
=== Population ===
At the time of the 2006 National Census, the city's population was 206,114 in 54,529 households. The following census in 2011 counted 221,814 people in 64,612 households. The 2016 census measured the population of the city as 235,281 people in 72,799 households.

== Agriculture ==
the city of Najafabad is known for its vast gardens, delicious food and friendly folk. It is home to many Iranian ethnicities but has a dominant Persian population; plus Lurs, Azeris, Iranian Georgians and Afghans.

Najafabad is not only a trade centre for towns near but also a cultural centre for people of Isfahan province. One of the few Iranian legal indie music festivals is held annually in Kharoun theatre in Najafabad.

== Climate ==
Najafabad has a cold desert climate (Köppen BWk).

Najafabad is located in a plain with a moderate and relatively dry climate. The average annual rainfall is 120 mm, which occurs mostly in cold seasons. The absolute maximum temperature of the atmosphere is 38 degrees and the absolute minimum temperature is 9.5 degrees and the average annual temperature is 15.8 degrees. The height of this city is 1600 meters above sea level.

Reduction of rainfall, excessive use of wells and improper use of water resources play an important role in the recent drought in Isfahan province. Najafabad plain is one of the basins located in this province.

Climate data for Najafabad
Month	Jan	Feb	Mar	Apr	May	Jun	Jul	Aug	Sep	Oct	Nov	Dec	Year
Mean daily maximum °C (°F)	8.3 (46.9)	12.1 (53.8)	17.5 (63.5)	22.9 (73.2)	28.8 (83.8)	34.4 (93.9)	36.5 (97.7)	35.0 (95.0)	31.2 (88.2)	24.6 (76.3)	15.2 (59.4)	10.1 (50.2)	23.1 (73.5)
Daily mean °C (°F)	1.0 (33.8)	4.3 (39.7)	9.6 (49.3)	15.5 (59.9)	21.5 (70.7)	27.3 (81.1)	29.9 (85.8)	28.4 (83.1)	24.0 (75.2)	17.4 (63.3)	8.5 (47.3)	3.2 (37.8)	15.9 (60.6)
Mean daily minimum °C (°F)	−5.5 (22.1)	−3.2 (26.2)	0.9 (33.6)	6.5 (43.7)	11.9 (53.4)	17.9 (64.2)	21.4 (70.5)	20.0 (68.0)	15.0 (59.0)	8.9 (48.0)	1.4 (34.5)	−3.3 (26.1)	7.7 (45.8)
Average precipitation mm (inches)	23 (0.9)	21 (0.8)	25 (1.0)	19 (0.7)	14 (0.6)	2 (0.1)	0 (0)	0 (0)	0 (0)	8 (0.3)	21 (0.8)	20 (0.8)	153 (6)
Average precipitation days (≥ 1.0 mm)	4	3	4	4	3	1	0	0	0	2	3	3	27
Average relative humidity (%)	51	43	35	31	21	13	15	14	16	27	46	55	31
Source: https://en.climate-data.org/asia/iran/isfahan/najaf-abad-6124/

== Military presence ==
Najafbad is home to 8th Najaf Ashraf Division, which was highly involved in Iran–Iraq War. Also Saheb-a-zaman corps of IRGC is highly present as they have a stronghold in the eastern entrance of the town. Other notable military Basis are Quds stronghold, Ashura brigade and 3rd Imam Hossein and 2nd Imam Hassan paramilitary bases which makes Najafabad one of the most militarised cities in Iran; for each five Najafabadis there is one IRGC or police force present in the city or strongholds.

== Gang activities ==
Najafabad was home to several gang activities, ranging from weapon sales to drug distribution systems controlled by notorious and unknown criminal gangs. The secrecy of the network made it one of the most mysterious aspects of Iran. In 2019 with the help of Irgc, Basij Mobilisation and security forces and Police some of the criminals were hunted down and executed however not much information is known about this network.

== Education ==
Najafabad is home to the Islamic Azad University Najafabad Branch, Payame Noor university of Najafabad, University of applied science and technology (Elmi-Karbordi) of Najafabad.

Najafabad is also home to famous Shahid Montazeri school. Also Imam Sadegh high school and Shahid Ezhei - Tizhooshan.

== International relations ==
=== Sister cities ===
As of 2024, the city of Najafabad has 1 sister city:

- Najaf, Iraq

== Notable people ==
Najafabad is the birthplace of:

- Grand Ayatollah Hossein-Ali Montazeri, 24 September 1922 – 19 December 2009, former deputy supreme leader of Iran
- Ebrahim Amini
- Mostafa Moeen
- Moein (singer)
- Gen. Ahmad Kazemi
- Mohammad Montazeri
- Ghorbanali Dori-Najafabadi
- Cpt. Mohsen Hojaji

== Gallery ==
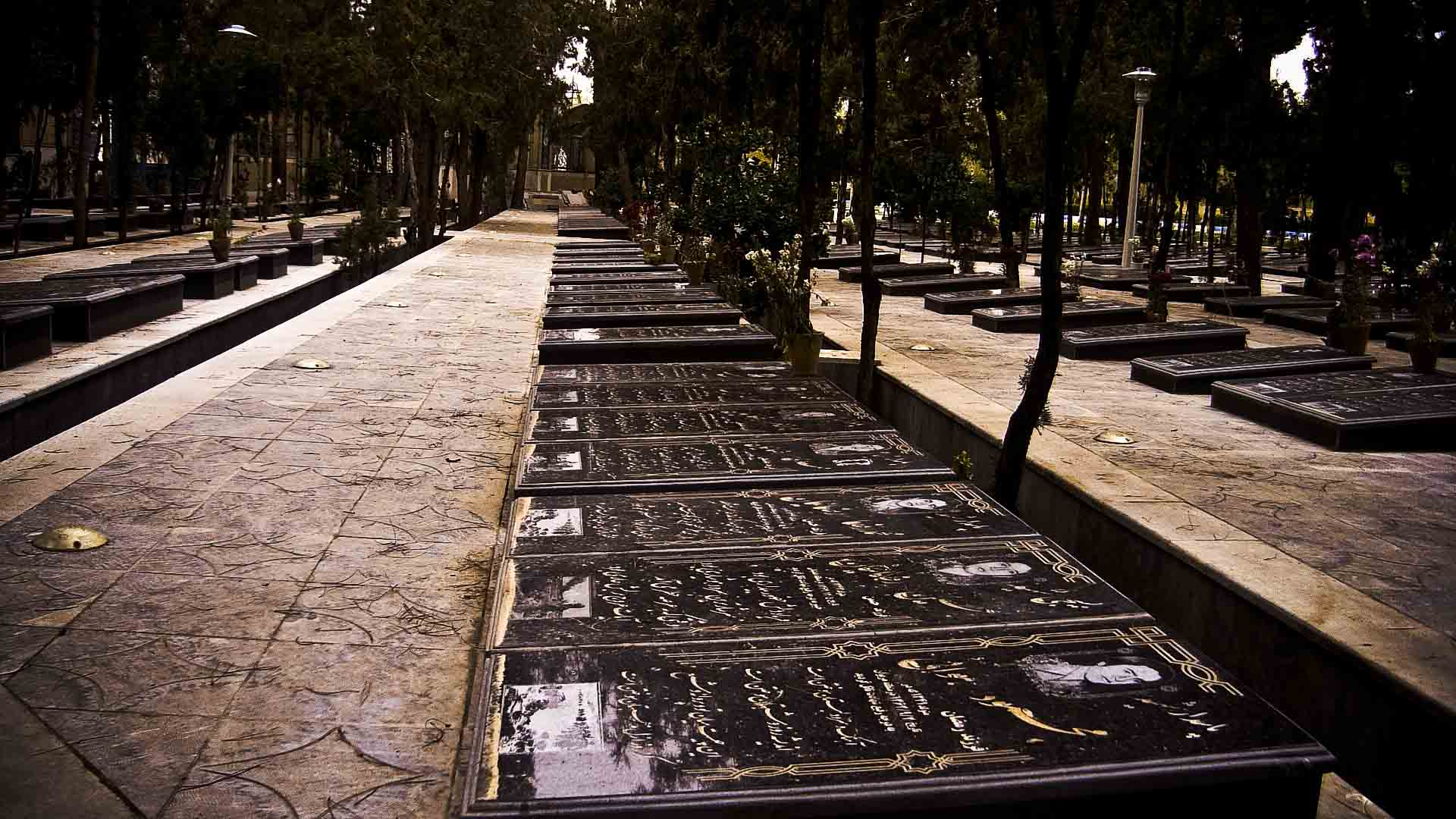

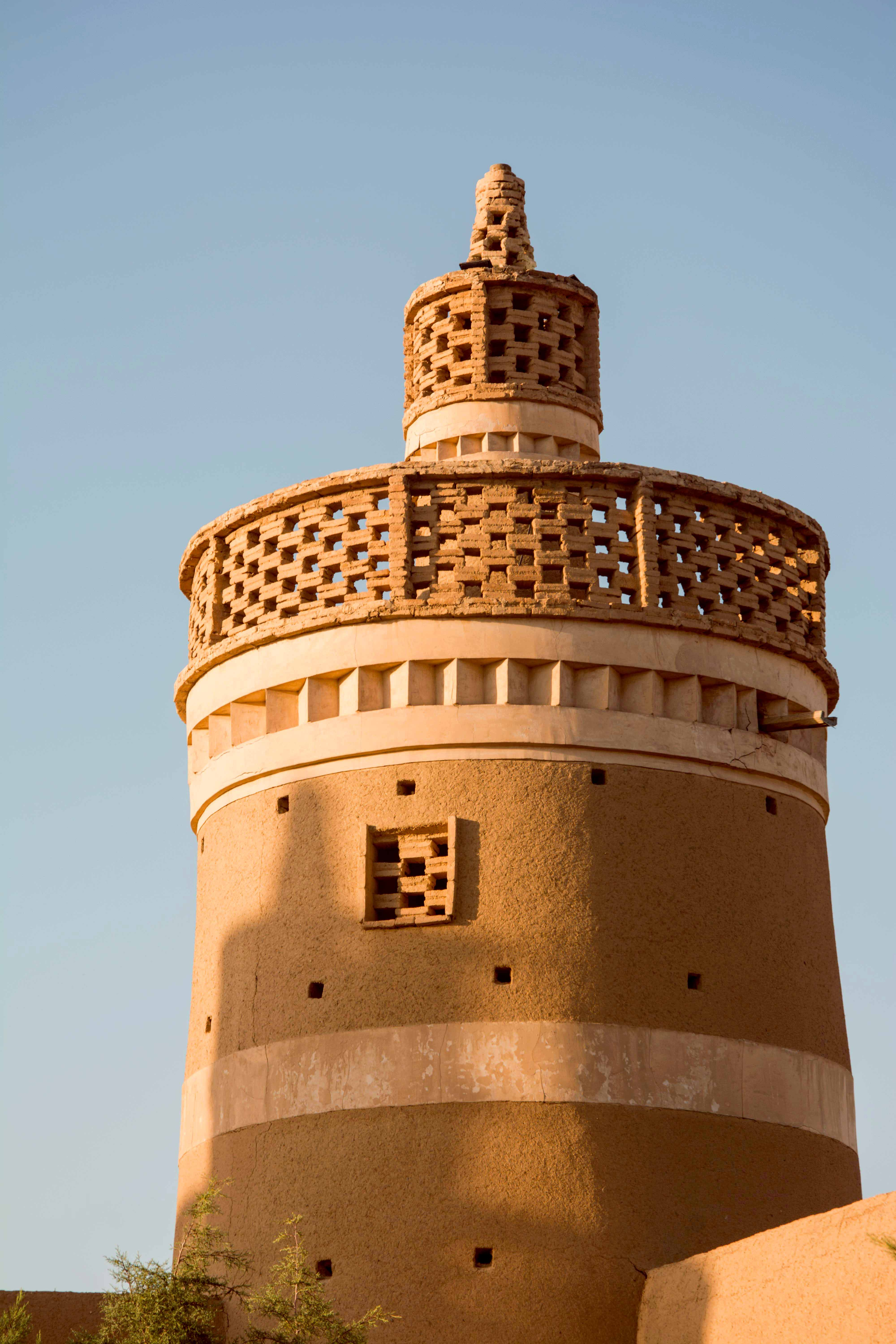

== See also ==
Vilashahr
