= Jowzdan =

City in Isfahan province, Iran

Jowzdan Persian: جوزدان
- City
- Location within Iran
- Coordinates: 32°33′21″N 51°22′22″E
- Country: Iran
- Province: Isfahan
- County: Najafabad
- District: Central

Population (2016)
  - Total: 6,998
- Time zone: UTC+3:30 (IRST)

Jowzdan (Persian: جوزدان) (Note: Also romanized as Jowzdān and Jūzdān; also known as Jazūn) is a city in the Central District of Najafabad County, Isfahan province, Iran, serving as the administrative center for Jowzdan Rural District.

== History ==
With 800 years of history, Jowzdan is one of the oldest cities in Isfahan province. Historians argue that the stones found in the town's mosque belong to the Timurid era.

The story behind the town's founding is that when the people of Gorg Abad, a small town near Kooh Panji in the Zagros Mountains, faced a huge threat from wolves in that area they moved and founded Jowzdan.

== Demographics ==
=== Population ===
At the time of the 2006 National Census, Jowzdan's population was 6,393 in 1,561 households, when it was a village in Jowzdan Rural District. The following census in 2011 counted 6,749 people in 1,849 households, by which time the village had been converted to a city. The 2016 census measured the population of the city as 6,998 people in 2,105 households.

== Religious sites ==
Jowzdan is home to several shrines such as Imamzade Sar-e-Maryam and Imamzade Chehel Dokhtaran.
