= Agah Pasha =

Ottoman politician (died 1855)

Abdülaziz Pasha (Ottoman Turkish: عبد العزيز پاشا Abdülaziz Paşa), known as Agah Pasha (آكاه پاشا, Agâh Paşa, d. November/December 1855) was an Ottoman official who held different bureaucratic posts and governorships. He held the rank of vezir since 1850.

== Biography ==
At the rank of hacegan in 1237 AH (1821/1822) he was appointed to a governmental post in Ağriboz province. In 1246 AH (1830/1831) he was appointed as a census official. In 1249 AH (1833/1833) he was made a defterdar of the third rank (defterdar-ı şikk-ı şalis) and appointed Accountant for Anatolia province (Anadolu muhasebecisi). He held other posts there culminating with the Defterdarlik of Anatolia. In Şevval 1262 AH (September/October 1846) he was awarded the rank of first grade, first class (ula sınıf-ı evveli), then he was made Defterdar of Baghdad province. In Rebiyülahir 1266 AH (February/March 1850) he was awarded the rank of bala. In Cemaziyelahir (April/May 1850) he was promoted to vezir, then in Şevval (August/September 1850) he was appointed Vali of Jeddah, then in 1852 he was dismissed. In Rebiyülevvel 1270 AH (December 1853) he was appointed Vali of Bursa. After leaving that post he became a member of the Grand Vizier's retinue in Şaban 1270 AH (May 1854). In Receb 1271 (March/April 1855) he was appointed governor of Shkodra. He died in Rebiyülevvel 1272 AH (November/December 1855).

Political offices
Preceded by Hekim Ismail Pasha	Vali of Scutari; 1855	Succeeded by Ataullah Pasha
Preceded by Damat Gürcü Halil Rifat Pasha	Vali of Hüdavendigâr; 1853–1854	Succeeded by Mehmed Emin Âli Pasha
Preceded by Erzincanlı Ahmed Izzet Pasha	Vali of Damascus; 1852	Succeeded by Ali Aşkar Pasha
Preceded by Mehmed Hasib Pasha	Vali of Jeddah and Habesh; 1850–1852	Succeeded by Erzincanlı Ahmed Izzet Pasha
Preceded by Mehmed Hasib Pasha	Shaykh al-Haram of Mecca; 1850–1852	Succeeded by Erzincanlı Ahmed Izzet Pasha
