= Gol Darreh, Kermanshah =

Gol Darreh گلدره
- Village
- Location within Iran
- Coordinates: 34°03′38″N 47°14′13″E
- Country: Iran
- Province: Kermanshah
- County: Kermanshah
- Bakhsh: Firuzabad
- Rural District: Sar Firuzabad

Population (2006)
  - Total: 120
- Time zone: UTC+3:30 (IRST)
  - Summer (DST): UTC+4:30 (IRDT)

Gol Darreh (Persian: گلدره) is a village in Sar Firuzabad Rural District, Firuzabad District, Kermanshah County, Kermanshah Province, Iran. At the 2006 census, its population was 120, in 26 families.
