= Jowzdan Rural District =

Rural district in Isfahan province, Iran

Jowzdan Rural District Persian: دهستان جوزدان
- Rural District
- Location within Iran
- Coordinates: 32°33′N 51°23′E
- Country: Iran
- Province: Isfahan
- County: Najafabad
- District: Central
- Established: 1987
- Capital: Jowzdan

Population (2016)
  - Total: 3,248
- Time zone: UTC+3:30 (IRST)

Jowzdan Rural District (Persian: دهستان جوزدان) is in the Central District of Najafabad County, Isfahan province, Iran. It is administered from the city of Jowzdan.

== Demographics ==
=== Population ===
At the time of the 2006 National Census, the rural district's population was 9,098 in 2,231 households. There were 3,300 inhabitants in 901 households at the following census of 2011. The 2016 census measured the population of the rural district as 3,248 in 917 households. The most populous of its 19 villages was Rahmatabad, with 2,153 people.

=== Other villages in the rural district ===
- Filur
- Jowzdan Communal Housing
