= Central District (Najafabad County) =

District in Isfahan province, Iran

Central District (Najafabad County) Persian: بخش مرکزی شهرستان نجف آباد
- District
- Location within Iran
- Coordinates: 32°42′N 51°20′E
- Country: Iran
- Province: Isfahan
- County: Najafabad
- Capital: Najafabad

Population (2016)
  - Total: 293,275
- Time zone: UTC+3:30 (IRST)

The Central District of Najafabad County (Persian: بخش مرکزی شهرستان نجف آباد) is in Isfahan province, Iran. Its capital is the city of Najafabad.

== History ==
The village of Jowzdan was converted to a city in 2007.

== Demographics ==
=== Population ===
At the time of the 2006 census, the district's population wa 254,672 in 67,106 households. The following census in 2011 counted 274,393 people in 79,768 households. The 2016 census measured the population of the district as 293,275 inhabitants in 90,158 households.

=== Administrative divisions ===
Central District (Najafabad County) Population
Administrative Divisions	2006	2011	2016
Jowzdan RD	9,098	3,300	3,248
Sadeqiyeh RD	7,579	9,753	11,666
Safayyeh RD	921	321	405
Goldasht (city) (Note: Formerly the village of Shahrak-e Emam)	22,693	23,192	25,235
Jowzdan (city)		6,749	6,998
Kahrizsang (city)	8,267	9,264	10,442
Najafabad (city)	206,114	221,814	235,281
Total	254,672	274,393	293,275
RD = Rural District
