= Mehrdasht District =

District in Isfahan province, Iran

Mehrdasht District Persian: بخش مهردشت
- District
- Location within Iran
- Coordinates: 33°05′N 50°55′E
- Country: Iran
- Province: Isfahan
- County: Najafabad
- Established: 1993
- Capitals: Hasanijeh

Population (2016)
  - Total: 25,928
- Time zone: UTC+3:30 (IRST)

Mehrdasht District (Persian: بخش مهردشت) is in Najafabad County, Isfahan province, Iran. Its capital is the village of Hasanijeh.

== Demographics ==
=== Population ===
At the time of the 2006 National Census, the district's population was 24,342 in 6,605 households. The following census in 2011 counted 25,895 people in 7,746 households. The 2016 census measured the population of the district as 25,928 inhabitants in 8,353 households.

=== Administrative divisions ===
Mehrdasht District Population
Administrative Divisions	2006	2011	2016
Eshen RD (Note: Formerly Arabestan-e Olya Rural District)	5,382	5,439	4,902
Hoseynabad RD (Note: Formerly Arabestan-e Sofla Rural District)	5,440	5,220	4,687
Alavijeh (city)	5,692	7,526	8,067
Dehaq (city)	7,828	7,710	8,272
Total	24,342	25,895	25,928
RD = Rural District
