= Haft Ashiyan Rural District =

Rural district in Kermanshah province, Iran

Haft Ashiyan Rural District Persian: دهستان هفت آشيان
- Rural District
- Location within Iran
- Coordinates: 34°21′00″N 46°35′25″E
- Country: Iran
- Province: Kermanshah
- County: Kermanshah
- District: Kuzaran
- Capital: Haft Ashiyan

Population (2016)
  - Total: 1,444
- Time zone: UTC+3:30 (IRST)

Haft Ashiyan Rural District (Persian: دهستان هفت آشيان) is in Kuzaran District of Kermanshah County, Kermanshah province, Iran. Its capital is the village of Haft Ashiyan.

== Demographics ==
=== Population ===
At the time of the 2006 National Census, the rural district's population was 1,828 in 435 households. There were 1,628 inhabitants in 432 households at the following census of 2011. The 2016 census measured the population of the rural district as 1,444 in 440 households. The most populous of its 29 villages was Haft Ashiyan, with 113 people.
