= Agahan Rural District =

Rural district in Kermanshah province, Iran

Agahan Rural District Persian: دهستان آگاهان
- Rural District
- Location within Iran
- Coordinates: 34°58′12″N 47°23′44″E
- Country: Iran
- Province: Kermanshah
- County: Sonqor
- District: Kolyai
- Capital: Agah-e Olya

Population (2016)
  - Total: 3,424
- Time zone: UTC+3:30 (IRST)

Agahan Rural District (Persian: دهستان آگاهان) is in Kolyai District of Sonqor County, Kermanshah province, Iran. Its capital is the village of Agah-e Olya.

== Demographics ==
=== Population ===
At the time of the 2006 National Census, the rural district's population was 5,061 in 1,142 households. There were 4,189 inhabitants in 1,251 households at the following census of 2011. The 2016 census measured the population of the rural district as 3,424 in 1,069 households. The most populous of its 31 villages was Haft Ashiyan, with 361 people.
