= Kivananat Rural District =

Rural district in Kermanshah province, Iran

Kivananat Rural District Persian: دهستان كيونانات
- Rural District
- Location within Iran
- Coordinates: 34°52′31″N 47°12′40″E
- Country: Iran
- Province: Kermanshah
- County: Sonqor
- District: Kolyai
- Capital: Kiveh Nan

Population (2016)
  - Total: 3,130
- Time zone: UTC+3:30 (IRST)

Kivananat Rural District (Persian: دهستان كيونانات) is in Kolyai District of Sonqor County, Kermanshah province, Iran. Its capital is the village of Kiveh Nan.

== Demographics ==
=== Population ===
At the time of the 2006 National Census, the rural district's population was 4,095 in 1,005 households. There were 4,056 inhabitants in 1,163 households at the following census of 2011. The 2016 census measured the population of the rural district as 3,130 in 918 households. The most populous of its 32 villages was Lenjab, with 327 people.
