= Satar Rural District =

Rural district in Kermanshah province, Iran

Satar Rural District Persian: دهستان سطر
- Rural District
- Location within Iran
- Coordinates: 34°49′36″N 47°26′47″E
- Country: Iran
- Province: Kermanshah
- County: Sonqor
- District: Kolyai
- Capital: Satar

Population (2016)
  - Total: 3,761
- Time zone: UTC+3:30 (IRST)

Satar Rural District (Persian: دهستان سطر) is in Kolyai District of Sonqor County, Kermanshah province, Iran. It is administered from the city of Satar.

== Demographics ==
=== Population ===
At the time of the 2006 National Census, the rural district's population was 5,160 in 1,327 households. There were 4,181 inhabitants in 1,151 households at the following census of 2011. The 2016 census measured the population of the rural district as 3,761 in 1,130 households. The most populous of its 32 villages was Shurabad, with 500 people.
