= Najafabad County =

County in Isfahan province, Iran

Najafabad County Persian: شهرستان نجف آباد
- County
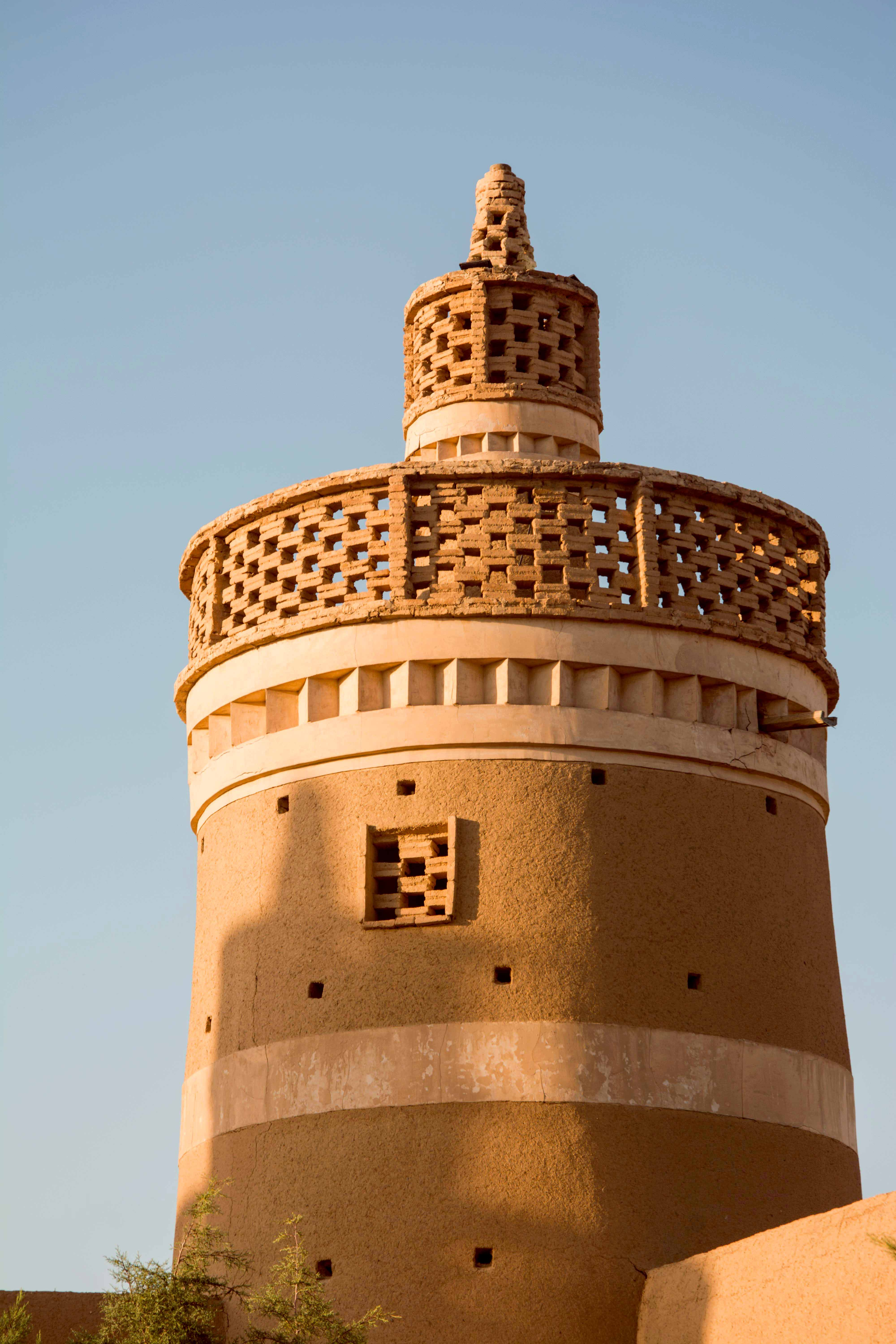
- Kharun Dovecote in Najafabad

- Location of Najafabad County in Isfahan province (center left, pink)

- Location of Isfahan province in Iran
- Coordinates: 32°49′N 51°15′E
- Country: Iran
- Province: Isfahan
- Capital: Najafabad
- Districts: Central, Mehrdasht

Population (2016)
  - Total: 319,205
- Time zone: UTC+3:30 (IRST)

Najafabad County (Persian: شهرستان نجف آباد) is in Isfahan province, Iran. Its capital is the city of Najafabad.

== History ==
The village of Jowzdan was converted to a city in 2007.

== Demographics ==
=== Population ===
At the time of the 2006 National Census, the county's population was 279,014 in 73,711 households. The following census in 2011 counted 300,288 people in 87,481 households. The 2016 census measured the population of the county as 319,205 in 98,513 households.

=== Administrative divisions ===
Najafabad County's population history and administrative structure over three consecutive censuses are shown in the following table.

Najafabad County Population
Administrative Divisions	2006	2011	2016
Central District	254,672	274,393	293,275
Jowzdan RD	9,098	3,300	3,248
Sadeqiyeh RD	7,579	9,753	11,666
Safayyeh RD	921	321	405
Goldasht (city) (Note: Formerly the village of Shahrak-e Emam)	22,693	23,192	25,235
Jowzdan (city)		6,749	6,998
Kahrizsang (city)	8,267	9,264	10,442
Najafabad (city)	206,114	221,814	235,281
Mehrdasht District	24,342	25,895	25,928
Eshen RD (Note: Formerly Arabestan-e Olya Rural District)	5,382	5,439	4,902
Hoseynabad RD (Note: Formerly Arabestan-e Sofla Rural District)	5,440	5,220	4,687
Alavijeh (city)	5,692	7,526	8,067
Dehaq (city)	7,828	7,710	8,272
Total	279,014	300,288	319,205
RD = Rural District

== See also ==
- 8th Najaf Ashraf Division

Media related to Najafabad County at Wikimedia Commons
