= Sanjabi Rural District =

Rural district in Kermanshah province, Iran

Sanjabi Rural District Persian: دهستان سنجابی
- Rural District
- Location within Iran
- Coordinates: 34°28′51″N 46°34′14″E
- Country: Iran
- Province: Kermanshah
- County: Kermanshah
- District: Kuzaran
- Capital: Kuzaran

Population (2016)
  - Total: 8,231
- Time zone: UTC+3:30 (IRST)

Sanjabi Rural District (Persian: دهستان سنجابی) is in Kuzaran District of Kermanshah County, Kermanshah province, Iran. It is administered from the city of Kuzaran.

== Demographics ==
=== Population ===
At the time of the 2006 National Census, the rural district's population was 9,575 in 2,037 households. There were 8,903 inhabitants in 2,315 households at the following census of 2011. The 2016 census measured the population of the rural district as 8,231 in 2,326 households. The most populous of its 90 villages was Baban Yavar-e Azizi, with 490 people.
