= Kuzaran District =

District in Kermanshah province, Iran

Kuzaran District Persian: بخش کوزران
- District
- Location within Iran
- Coordinates: 34°26′45″N 46°34′14″E
- Country: Iran
- Province: Kermanshah
- County: Kermanshah
- Capital: Kuzaran

Population (2016)
  - Total: 13,682
- Time zone: UTC+3:30 (IRST)

Kuzaran District (Persian: بخش کوزران) is in Kermanshah County, Kermanshah province, Iran. Its capital is the city of Kuzaran.

== Demographics ==
=== Population ===
At the time of the 2006 National Census, the district's population was 15,162 in 3,282 households. The following census in 2011 counted 14,465 people in 3,782 households. The 2016 census measured the population of the district as 13,682 inhabitants in 3,906 households.

=== Administrative divisions ===
Kuzaran District Population
| Administrative Divisions | 2006 | 2011 | 2016 |
|---|---|---|---|
| Haft Ashiyan RD | 1,828 | 1,628 | 1,444 |
| Sanjabi RD | 9,575 | 8,903 | 8,231 |
| Kuzaran (city) | 3,759 | 3,934 | 4,007 |
| Total | 15,162 | 14,465 | 13,682 |
RD = Rural District
