= Kolyai District =

District in Kermanshah province, Iran

Kolyai District Persian: بخش کلیائی
- District
- Location within Iran
- Coordinates: 34°54′24″N 47°20′11″E
- Country: Iran
- Province: Kermanshah
- County: Sonqor
- Capital: Satar

Population (2016)
  - Total: 11,363
- Time zone: UTC+3:30 (IRST)

Kolyai District (Persian: بخش کلیائی) is in Sonqor County, Kermanshah province, Iran. Its capital is the city of Satar.

== Demographics ==
=== Population ===
At the time of the 2006 National Census, the district's population was 15,600 in 3,828 households. The following census in 2011 counted 13,653 people in 3,891 households. The 2016 census measured the population of the district as 11,363 inhabitants in 3,442 households.

=== Administrative divisions ===
Kolyai District Population
Administrative Divisions	2006	2011	2016
Agahan RD	5,061	4,189	3,424
Kivananat RD	4,095	4,056	3,130
Satar RD	5,160	4,181	3,761
Satar (city)	1,284	1,227	1,048
Total	15,600	13,653	11,363
RD = Rural District
