= Ab Barik =

Ab Barik or Ab-e Barik or Ab-i-Barik (Persian: ابباريك) may refer to:

== Afghanistan ==
- Āb Bārīk, a village in Afghanistan
- Ab-e Barik-e Qowdi, a village in Afghanistan

== Iran ==
=== Fars Province ===
- Ab Barik, Fars, a village in Eqlid County

=== Hamadan Province ===
- Ab Barik, Bahar, a village in Bahar County
- Ab Barik, Razan, a village in Razan County

=== Kerman Province ===
- Ab Barik, Kerman, a village in Manujan County

=== Kermanshah Province ===
- Ab Barik, Kangavar, a village in Kangavar County
- Ab Barik-e Jonubi, a village in Sahneh County
- Ab Barik-e Shomali, a village in Sahneh County
- Ab Barik, Sarpol-e Zahab, a village in Sarpol-e Zahab County
- Ab Barik-e Olya, Kermanshah, a village in Sonqor County
- Ab Barik-e Sofla, Kermanshah, a village in Sonqor County
- Ab Barik-e Vosta, a village in Sonqor County
- Ab Barik Rural District, in Sonqor County

=== Khuzestan Province ===
- Ab Barik, Khuzestan, a village in Masjed Soleyman County

=== Kurdistan Province ===
- Ab Barik, Bijar, a village in Bijar County
- Ab Barik, Dehgolan, a village in Dehgolan County
- Ab Barik, Divandarreh, a village in Divandarreh County
- Ab Barik, Qorveh, a village in Qorveh County

=== Lorestan Province ===
- Ab Barik, Aligudarz, a village in Aligudarz County
- Ab Barik-e Olya, Aligudarz, a village in Aligudarz County
- Ab Barik-e Sofla, Aligudarz, a village in Aligudarz County
- Ab Barik, Kuhdasht, a village in Kuhdasht County
- Ab Barik-e Olya, Selseleh, a village in Selseleh County
- Ab Barik-e Sofla, Selseleh, a village in Selseleh County

=== Markazi Province ===
- Ab Barik, Markazi, a village in Shazand County

=== North Khorasan Province ===
- Ab Barik, North Khorasan, a village in Jajrom County

=== Qazvin Province ===
- Ab Barik, Qazvin, a village in Buin Zahra County

=== Razavi Khorasan Province ===
- Ab Barik-e Bala, a village in Bajestan County
- Ab Barik, Razavi Khorasan, a village in Sabzevar County
- Ab Barik-e Olya, Razavi Khorasan, a village in Torbat-e Heydarieh County
- Ab Barik-e Sofla, Razavi Khorasan, a village in Torbat-e Heydarieh County

=== Tehran Province ===
- Ab Barik, Tehran, a village in Varamin County
- Ab Barik-e Kuchek, a village in Firuzkuh County

== See also ==
- Barik Ab (disambiguation)
