= Sar Darreh =

Sar Darreh or Sardarah or Sardareh or Sardarreh (Persian: سردره) may refer to various places in Iran:

- Sardarreh, Ardabil
- Sardarah, Hormozgan
- Sar Darreh, Kermanshah
- Sar Darreh-ye Beyglar Beygi, Kermanshah Province
- Sar Darreh, Khuzestan
- Sar Darreh, Charam, Kohgiluyeh and Boyer-Ahmad Province
- Sar Darreh, Kohgiluyeh, Kohgiluyeh and Boyer-Ahmad Province
- Sar Darreh, Charusa, Kohgiluyeh and Boyer-Ahmad Province
- Sar Darreh, Kurdistan
- Sar Darreh, Lorestan
- Sar Darreh, West Azerbaijan
