= 1957 Farsinaj earthquake =

Natural disaster in Iran

- Location within Iran
- UTC time: 1957-12-13 01:45:04
- ISC event: 887684
- USGS-ANSS: ComCat
- Local date: 13 December 1957
- Local time: 05:15:04
- Magnitude: 6.8 M_{w}
- Depth: 15 km (9 mi)
- Epicenter: 34.388°N 47.748°E
- Areas affected: Iran
- Max. intensity: MMI VII (Very strong)
- Casualties: 1,130 dead

An earthquake struck Hamadan province, Iran on 13 December 1957 at 05:15. The moment magnitude 6.8 earthquake struck at a depth of 15 km (9.3 mi). The epicenter of the earthquake was located in the seismically active Zagros Mountains. The mountain range was also the location for several historic earthquakes. The earthquake occurred near two segments of the active strike-slip Main Recent Fault. At least 1,130 people died, including over 700 in the village of Farsinaj. Additional deaths also occurred in Dehasiyab, Sarab, and other villages. The earthquake left an estimated 15,000 homeless; poor weather conditions including a winter storm on 21 December killed another 20 people. Several deadly and damaging aftershocks in that month killed a total of 38 people.

== Tectonic setting ==
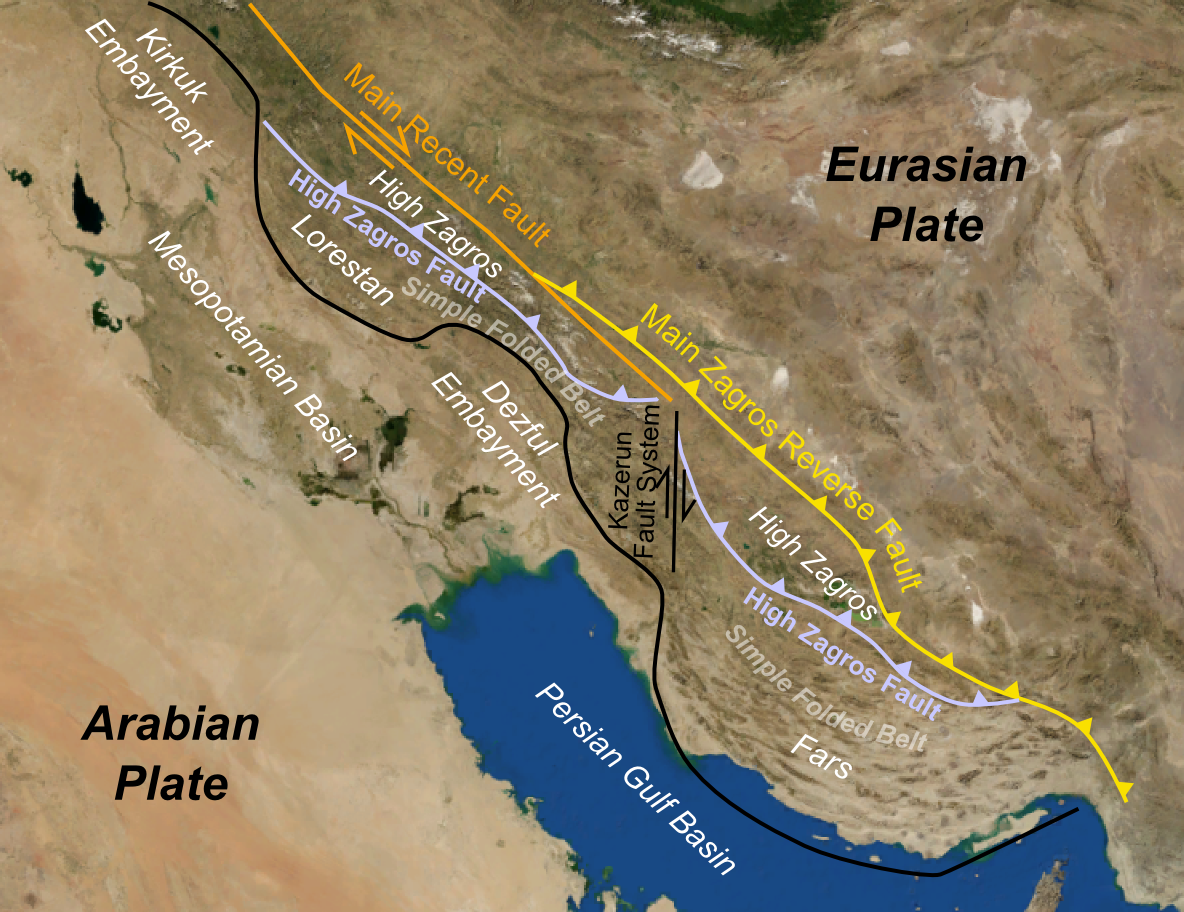
The northeast-trending Main Recent Fault in the Zagros Mountains

The Zagros Mountains extends for more than 1,500 km (930 mi); from Turkey to the Gulf of Oman, and through Iran and Iraq. It was formed by continental collision involving the Arabian plate and Central Iran. Its formation occurred during the late-Triassic, late-Jurassic, late-Cretaceous, Oligocene and Pliocene. During its early formation, some extensional tectonics may have occurred. The mountain range is still accommodating deformation, evident from present-day seismicity. Deformation is accommodated by thrust and strike-slip faulting within the range. Parallel to major thrust faults of the mountains is the Main Recent Fault, an active right-lateral strike-slip fault. Convergence between the Arabian plate and Iran occurs obliquely along the Zagros Mountains, and approximately 30–50 percent of the ~25 cm (9.8 in) per year convergence between the two plates is accommodated along the range.

The Zagros Mountains is seismically active while in the Iranian plateau; to the northeast, seismicity is nearly absent. The Main Recent Fault delineates the northeastern boundary of the Zagros Mountains, forming between 3 and 5 million years ago. It runs parallel to the Main Zagros Reverse Fault, a suture zone separating the Sanandaj-Sirjan Zone from the fold and thrust belt. The fault comprises several segments with lengths of more than 100 km (62 mi). Southwest of the Main Recent Fault lies the continental margin of Arabia while the rocks to the northeast are of metamorphic and volcanic origin. Its southeastern segments ends in a zone of north–northwest trending strike-slip faults. The strike-slip component of this oblique convergence is accommodated along the Main Recent Fault. The southeastern segments are more seismically active in contrast to the northwestern segments.

=== Historic seismicity ===
Three historical earthquakes were documented near the Main Recent Fault. Two earthquakes in May 912 and April 1008 occurred near the former settlement of Dinavar while a third occurred to the southeast of Dorud before 1889. The first two earthquakes brought heavy damage and casualties in Dinawar. During an earthquake in 912, a "mountain split open" and water ejected from the fissure, sinking many settlements. Ground cracks, possibly associated with tectonic origins, were documented during a 1008 earthquake. The Main Recent Fault was also the source of a M_{s} 7.4 earthquake in 1909 that produced over 40 km (25 mi) of surface rupture. Seismicity along the Main Recent Fault was nearly absent since 1909. In December 1955, an earthquake near Razan caused rockfalls and three deaths.

== Earthquake ==
=== Mainshock ===
The earthquake occurred at 05:15 on 13 December with a moment magnitude of 6.8. One foreshock was felt 26 hours before the mainshock and 32 aftershocks occurred within a month later. Its epicenters were instrumentally recorded and located, revealing a northeast—southwest trend intersecting the Main Recent Fault. The earthquake caused ground deformation such as rockfalls and fractures. There were six reports of northeast-trending ground fractures, and some extended for several kilometers. Some of these fractures were caused by landslides and rockfalls. Villagers reported a vertical rupture located along the Main Recent Fault resulting in the northeastern side subsiding by 1 m (3 ft 3 in).

The meizoseismal area had a generally northwest–southeast trend along the Main Recent Fault. The heaviest damage extended northeast of the fault, in an area where aftershocks were also distributed. The degree of damage decreased sharply towards the southwest of the trend. Most villages southwest of the fault were situated on bedrock and sustained minimal to no damage. Northeast of the fault, devastation extended up to 55 km (34 mi) away, impacting villages such as Farsinaj and Gerareh. Along this section of the Main Recent Fault, called the Sahneh and Dinevar segments, the structure dips towards the northeast. Greater damage to the northeast with respect to the meizoseismal trend may indicate the earthquake ruptured along faults buried beneath the region at greater depth.

=== Impact ===
At least 1,130 people died, 900 were injured, and 15,000 became homeless. Twenty thousand animals also died, and 211 villages were destroyed. Twenty additional deaths and more livestock were lost due to the cold weather including a winter storm on 21 December. Serious damage was distributed over a 2,800 km^{2} (1,100 sq mi) area while the shock was felt for 180,000 km^{2} (69,000 sq mi). The mainshock and its aftershocks heavily damaged 5,000 of the 9,000 homes in the area. Most of these homes were characterised by their single-storey adobe or masonry materials held together by mud. These homes also had heavy roofs made from tampered earth. Government properties in the area were double-storey adobe and single-storey brick construction with jack arches or iron sheets as the roofing.

In the epicenter area, the seismic intensity was assigned VII (Very strong) on the Modified Mercalli intensity scale. The area of maximum damage was between Kangavar and Farsinaj, and the most affected areas were north of Sahneh. The severity of damage became inconsistent and rapidly fell to the south. At Farsinaj, 702 people, or about half the population, perished, and only 30 homes were left intact. The village was reconstructed 1 km (0.62 mi) away from the ruins. At Dehasiyab, 34 people died and 23 were injured—the village was razed and reconstructed several hundred meters away. Six people died, 20 were injured and two-thirds of homes in Sollantaher were destroyed. The entire village of Kalbikhani was levelled and 22 died. At Sarab, 53 residents died, whereas at Sahneh, Gakul and Bisitun, damage was moderate. In Sarab Bidsorkh, 46 residents of the nearly-razed town perished. Sixty-three people died in the ruins of Cheqa-Bala and Cheqa-Pay, while at Khariz, 11 people died. No serious damage or high fatalities occurred within a 15 km (9.3 mi) radius around Farsinaj, and at Sonqor, only cracks appeared in some buildings. Two people died, some adobe homes, and old shops at a marketplace were damaged in Kangavar.

=== Aftershocks ===
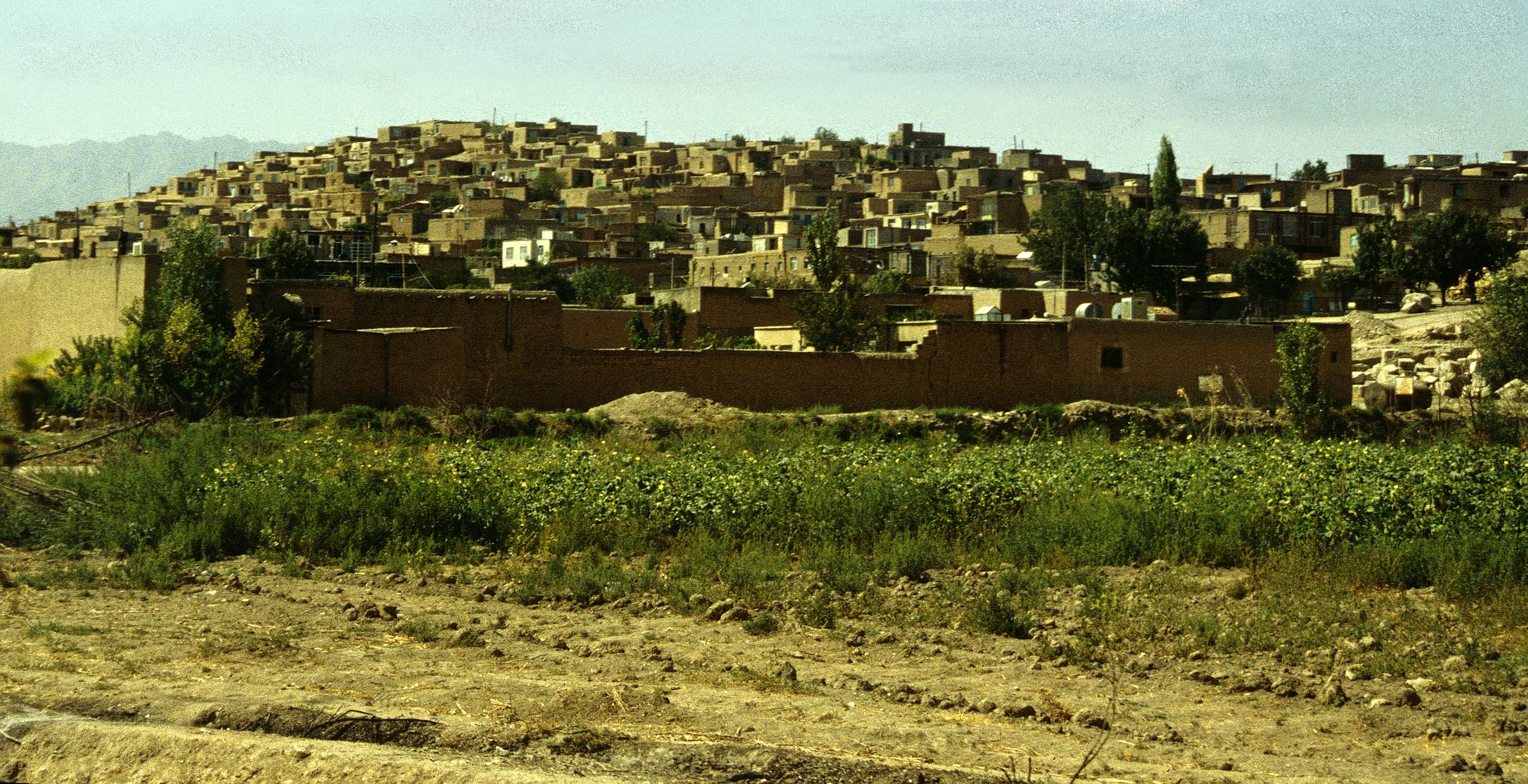
An aftershock centered near Kangavar killed 20 while only two died in the city during the mainshock

Aftershocks on 13 and 18 December near Kangavar and Firuzabad on 28 December caused further damage. An aftershock on 14 December in Kangavar caused over 20 deaths, 50 injuries and devastated 15 villages. Another aftershock on the same day at Najafabad and Gurveh killed one, injured four, and destroyed more buildings. Three villages including Sarab sustained major damage during a 16 December aftershock. Fourteen people died in an aftershock on 18 December at Fash. On 31 December, another aftershock killed three at Kangavar and ruined some homes that had been restored following previous shocks. On 16 August 1958, a magnitude 6.6 earthquake struck the same area affected by the mainshock. This earthquake was the largest since the 1957 Farsinaj earthquake, and killed over 130 people.

== See also ==
- List of earthquakes in 1957
- List of earthquakes in Iran
