= Hezar Khani =

Hezar Khani or Hezarkhani or Hazar Khani (Persian: هزارخاني) may refer to:

- Hezar Khani, Kermanshah
- Hezar Khani, Kangavar, Kermanshah Province
- Hezar Khani-ye Olya, Kermanshah Province
- Hezar Khani-ye Sofla, Kermanshah Province
- Hezar Khani, Kurdistan
- Hezar Khani, Lorestan
