= Meykharan =

Meykharan or Meykhoran or Meykhowran (Persian: ميخواران), also rendered as Maikhoran or Mey Kharan or Mae Khuran or Maekharan or Makhran, may refer to:

- Meykharan-e Mohammad Aqa
- Meykharan-e Mohammad Sadeq
- Meykharan-e Pir Ali Khan
- Meykharan-e Sadat
