= Gerdakaneh =

Gerdakaneh (Persian: گردكانه), also rendered as Gerda Kaneh or Gerdeh Kaneh or Gerdeh Kani or Gerdkani or Girdehkani, may refer to:

- Gerdakaneh, Kermanshah
- Gerdakaneh-ye Olya, Kermanshah Province
- Gerdakaneh-ye Sofla, Kermanshah Province
- Gerdakaneh, Lorestan
- Gerdakaneh Sanjabi
