= Sonqori Turks =

Small Turkic community in western Iran

The Sonqori Turks are a Turkic people living mainly in the city of Sonqor in the Kermanshah province of Iran. They traced their presence to the Mongol period, and they lived surrounded by Kurds whom they absorbed much influence from. The Sonqori Turks speak the Sonqori dialect of Oghuz Turkic, in addition to Kurdish and Persian, and follow Shia Islam.

== History ==
The Sonqori Turks were part of the wider Qashqai confederation, which originated from Turkic migrations into Iran around the 13th century, as well as Turkic and other tribes that were mobile in Iran before and after, eventually forming the Qashqai confederacy by the 18th century. According to Vladimir Minorsky, the Turks of Sonqor came during the Mongol period in Iran, during which their chief, Sonqor, was a vassal of the Mongols of Shiraz. He added that the district of Sonqor had two population elements, the Kurds and Turks, with the Turks living in the town of Sonqor, which had a population of 37,772 in 1991, while the district of Sonqor was populated by Kurds of the Kolya'i tribe, who later ruled the region. Knüppel added that the town of Sonqor was in a large valley separated from the rest of Kurdistan, and in its neighborhood there were also two small villages, Qaleh-ye Farhad Khan and Qorveh, whose dialects barely differed from the main Sonqori.

Sonqor later became a sub-province in the Kermanshah province. At one point the sub-province was designated as Sonqor-e Kolya'i or Sonqor-o-Kolya'i, consisting of the boluks of Sonqor, on the upper course of the Dinavar river, and Kolya'i on the upper tributaries of the Gavarud. The Sonqor sub-province, had a population of over 81,000 in 2016, and administratively united the Sonqor Turks with the Kolya'i Kurds, with the Turks forming most of the city of Sonqor, with a population of over 44,000, while the countryside was chiefly populated by the Kolya'i Kurds. Many Kolya'i Kurds moved to the city of Sonqor but detribalized due to the urban environment. The Sonqori Turks were historically easily distinguished from the Kolya'i Kurds due to the Kolya'i wearing Kurdish clothing.

== Language ==
The Turkic variety of Sonqor was spoken inside "a small Turkic island in the middle of a predominantly Kurdish region", and Gerhard Doerfer classified it as a distinctive member of the Southern Oghuz or Afshar group. It was traditionally spoken in the Sonqor valley, almost entirely in the city of Sonqor, and had an estimated 40,000 speakers in 2017. The residents of the city of Sonqor were traditionally trilingual in Turkic, Kurdish, and Persian. Sonqori morphosyntax had substantial Iranian impact, chiefly due to its long and intensive contact with Kurdish, but retained its Turkic character by way of pronouns, adverbs, verbs, a minimum of case morphology, postpositional phrases, a system of verb paradigms, among other inherent grammatical features.

== See also ==
- Chaharmahali Turks
- Baharlu
