= Deh-e Elyas =

Deh-e Elyas ده الياس
- Village
- Location within Iran
- Coordinates: 34°44′30″N 47°50′38″E
- Country: Iran
- Province: Kermanshah
- County: Sonqor
- Bakhsh: Central
- Rural District: Ab Barik

Population (2006)
  - Total: 309
- Time zone: UTC+3:30 (IRST)
  - Summer (DST): UTC+4:30 (IRDT)

Deh-e Elyas (Persian: ده الياس, also Romanized as Deh-e Elyās) is a village in Ab Barik Rural District, in the Central District of Sonqor County, Kermanshah Province, Iran. At the 2006 census, its population was 309, in 56 families.
