= Mansur Arab =

Mansur Arab منصورعرب
- Village
- Location within Iran
- Coordinates: 34°55′56″N 47°41′21″E
- Country: Iran
- Province: Kermanshah
- County: Sonqor
- Bakhsh: Central
- Rural District: Bavaleh

Population (2006)
  - Total: 252
- Time zone: UTC+3:30 (IRST)
  - Summer (DST): UTC+4:30 (IRDT)

Mansur Arab (Persian: منصورعرب, also Romanized as Manşūr ‘Arab) is a village in Bavaleh Rural District, in the Central District of Sonqor County, Kermanshah Province, Iran. At the 2006 census, its population was 252, in 61 families.
