= Aranlah =

Aranlah ارانله
- Village
- Location within Iran
- Coordinates: 34°52′13″N 47°41′09″E
- Country: Iran
- Province: Kermanshah
- County: Sonqor
- Bakhsh: Central
- Rural District: Bavaleh

Population (2006)
  - Total: 259
- Time zone: UTC+3:30 (IRST)
  - Summer (DST): UTC+4:30 (IRDT)

Aranlah (Persian: ارانله, also Romanized as Ārānlah; also known as Azānlah) is a village in Bavaleh Rural District, in the Central District of Sonqor County, Kermanshah Province, Iran. At the 2006 census, its population was 259, in 56 families.
