= Varmaqan =

Varmaqan ورمقان
- Village
- Location within Iran
- Coordinates: 35°01′53″N 47°42′15″E
- Country: Iran
- Province: Kermanshah
- County: Sonqor
- Bakhsh: Central
- Rural District: Bavaleh

Population (2006)
  - Total: 216
- Time zone: UTC+3:30 (IRST)
  - Summer (DST): UTC+4:30 (IRDT)

Varmaqan (Persian: ورمقان, also Romanized as Varmaqān and Warmaqān; also known as Varmaghān, Varmakān, and Vazmakān) is a village in Bavaleh Rural District, in the Central District of Sonqor County, Kermanshah Province, Iran. At the 2006 census, its population was 216, in 44 families.
