= Karsavan =

Karsavan كرسوان
- Village
- Location within Iran
- Coordinates: 34°54′21″N 47°50′05″E
- Country: Iran
- Province: Kermanshah
- County: Sonqor
- Bakhsh: Central
- Rural District: Bavaleh

Population (2006)
  - Total: 130
- Time zone: UTC+3:30 (IRST)
  - Summer (DST): UTC+4:30 (IRDT)

Karsavan (Persian: كرسوان, also Romanized as Karsavān) is a village in Bavaleh Rural District, in the Central District of Sonqor County, Kermanshah Province, Iran. At the 2006 census, its population was 130, in 30 families.
