= Deh Soleyman =

Deh Soleyman ده سليمان
- Village
- Location within Iran
- Coordinates: 34°52′55″N 47°30′56″E
- Country: Iran
- Province: Kermanshah
- County: Sonqor
- Bakhsh: Central
- Rural District: Gavrud

Population (2006)
  - Total: 345
- Time zone: UTC+3:30 (IRST)
  - Summer (DST): UTC+4:30 (IRDT)

Deh Soleyman (Persian: ده سليمان, also Romanized as Deh Soleymān; also known as Soleymān Shāh) is a village in Gavrud Rural District, in the Central District of Sonqor County, Kermanshah Province, Iran. At the 2006 census, its population was 345, in 75 families.
