= Deh-e Khazal =

Deh-e Khazal ده خزل
- Village
- Location within Iran
- Coordinates: 34°53′11″N 47°51′30″E
- Country: Iran
- Province: Kermanshah
- County: Sonqor
- Bakhsh: Central
- Rural District: Bavaleh

Population (2006)
  - Total: 65
- Time zone: UTC+3:30 (IRST)
  - Summer (DST): UTC+4:30 (IRDT)

Deh-e Khazal (Persian: ده خزل; also known as Khazal) is a village in Bavaleh Rural District, in the Central District of Sonqor County, Kermanshah Province, Iran. At the 2006 census, its population was 65, in 16 families.
