= Qomam =

Village in Kermanshah province, Iran

Qomam Persian: قمام
- Village
- Location within Iran
- Coordinates: 34°54′47″N 47°34′21″E
- Country: Iran
- Province: Kermanshah
- County: Sonqor
- District: Bavaleh
- Rural District: Gavrud

Population (2016)
  - Total: 18
- Time zone: UTC+3:30 (IRST)

Qomam (Persian: قمام) (Note: Also romanized as Qomām) is a village in, and the former capital of, Gavrud Rural District of Bavaleh District, Sonqor County, Kermanshah province, Iran. The capital of the rural district has been transferred to the village of Deh-e Rezvan.

== Demographics ==
=== Population ===
At the time of the 2006 National Census, the village's population was 245 in 64 households, when it was in the Central District. The village did not appear in the following census of 2011. The 2016 census measured the population of the village as 18 people in 5 households.

In 2021, the rural district was separated from the district in the establishment of Bavaleh District.
