= Deh-e Rezvan =

Village in Kermanshah province, Iran

Deh-e Rezvan Persian: ده رضوان
- Village
- Location within Iran
- Coordinates: 34°57′59″N 47°34′17″E
- Country: Iran
- Province: Kermanshah
- County: Sonqor
- District: Bavaleh
- Rural District: Gavrud

Population (2016)
  - Total: 207
- Time zone: UTC+3:30 (IRST)

Deh-e Rezvan (Persian: ده رضوان) (Note: Also romanized as Deh-e Reẕvān) is a village in, and the capital of, Gavrud Rural District of Bavaleh District, Sonqor County, Kermanshah province, Iran. The previous capital of the rural district was the village of Qomam.

== Demographics ==
=== Population ===
At the time of the 2006 National Census, the village's population was 404 in 83 households, when it was in the Central District. The following census in 2011 counted 343 people in 96 households. The 2016 census measured the population of the village as 207 people in 61 households.

In 2021, the rural district was separated from the district in the formation of Bavaleh District.
