= Darreh Vazam =

Darreh Vazam دره وزم
- Village
- Location within Iran
- Coordinates: 35°02′18″N 47°41′02″E
- Country: Iran
- Province: Kermanshah
- County: Sonqor
- Bakhsh: Central
- Rural District: Bavaleh

Population (2006)
  - Total: 112
- Time zone: UTC+3:30 (IRST)
  - Summer (DST): UTC+4:30 (IRDT)

Darreh Vazam (Persian: دره وزم, also Romanized as Darreh Vezem and Darreh Vezm; also known as Takrūzom and Taqrūzūm) is a village in Bavaleh Rural District, in the Central District of Sonqor County, Kermanshah Province, Iran. At the 2006 census, its population was 112, in 18 families.
