= Heybatollah =

Heybatollah هيبت اله
- Village
- Location within Iran
- Coordinates: 34°50′18″N 47°36′10″E
- Country: Iran
- Province: Kermanshah
- County: Sonqor
- Bakhsh: Central
- Rural District: Gavrud

Population (2006)
  - Total: 231
- Time zone: UTC+3:30 (IRST)
  - Summer (DST): UTC+4:30 (IRDT)

Heybatollah (Persian: هيبت اله, also transliterated as Heybatollāh) is a village in Gavrud Rural District, in the Central District of Sonqor County, Kermanshah Province, Iran. At the 2006 census its population was 231, in 47 families.
