= Marengaz =

Marengaz مارانگاز
- Village
- Location within Iran
- Coordinates: 34°45′40″N 47°42′08″E
- Country: Iran
- Province: Kermanshah
- County: Sonqor
- Bakhsh: Central
- Rural District: Ab Barik

Population (2006)
  - Total: 1,099
- Time zone: UTC+3:30 (IRST)
  - Summer (DST): UTC+4:30 (IRDT)

Marengaz (Persian: مارانگاز, also Romanized as Mārengāz and Mārān Gāz; also known as Marangās) is a village in Ab Barik Rural District, in the Central District of Sonqor County, Kermanshah Province, Iran. At the 2006 census, its population was 1,099, in 259 families.
