= Palangin =

Palangin پلنگين
- Village
- Location within Iran
- Coordinates: 34°50′43″N 47°41′50″E
- Country: Iran
- Province: Kermanshah
- County: Sonqor
- Bakhsh: Central
- Rural District: Ab Barik

Population (2006)
  - Total: 89
- Time zone: UTC+3:30 (IRST)
  - Summer (DST): UTC+4:30 (IRDT)

Palangin (Persian: پلنگين, also Romanized as Palangīn) is a village in Ab Barik Rural District, in the Central District of Sonqor County, Kermanshah Province, Iran. At the 2006 census, its population was 89, in 23 families.
