= Deh-e Hammzeh =

Deh-e Hammzeh ده حمزه
- Village
- Location within Iran
- Coordinates: 34°45′37″N 47°50′20″E
- Country: Iran
- Province: Kermanshah
- County: Sonqor
- Bakhsh: Central
- Rural District: Ab Barik

Population (2006)
  - Total: 90
- Time zone: UTC+3:30 (IRST)
  - Summer (DST): UTC+4:30 (IRDT)

Deh-e Hammzeh (Persian: ده حمزه, also Romanized as Deh-e Ḩammzeh and Deh-e Ḩamzeh) is a village in Ab Barik Rural District, in the Central District of Sonqor County, Kermanshah Province, Iran. At the 2006 census, its population was 90, in 22 families.
