= Nokhod Tappeh =

Nokhvod Tappeh نخودتپه
- Village
- Location within Iran
- Coordinates: 34°46′24″N 47°31′48″E
- Country: Iran
- Province: Kermanshah
- County: Sonqor
- Bakhsh: Central
- Rural District: Sarab

Population (2006)
  - Total: 323
- Time zone: UTC+3:30 (IRST)
  - Summer (DST): UTC+4:30 (IRDT)

Nokhvod Tappeh (Persian: نخودتپه, also Romanized as Nokhowd Tappeh; also known as Nukbūd Tepe) is a village in Sarab Rural District, in the Central District of Sonqor County, Kermanshah Province, Iran. At the 2006 census, its population was 323, in 80 families.
