= Cheshmeh Qareh =

Cheshmeh Qareh چشمه قره
- Village
- Location within Iran
- Coordinates: 34°54′22″N 47°52′16″E
- Country: Iran
- Province: Kermanshah
- County: Sonqor
- Bakhsh: Central
- Rural District: Bavaleh

Population (2006)
  - Total: 106
- Time zone: UTC+3:30 (IRST)
  - Summer (DST): UTC+4:30 (IRDT)

Cheshmeh Qareh (Persian: چشمه قره) is a village in Bavaleh Rural District, in the Central District of Sonqor County, Kermanshah Province, Iran. At the 2006 census, its population was 106, in 22 families.
