= Changareh =

Changareh چنگره
- Village
- Location within Iran
- Coordinates: 34°53′11″N 47°37′28″E
- Country: Iran
- Province: Kermanshah
- County: Sonqor
- Bakhsh: Central
- Rural District: Gavrud

Population (2006)
  - Total: 110
- Time zone: UTC+3:30 (IRST)
  - Summer (DST): UTC+4:30 (IRDT)

Changareh (Persian: چنگره, also Romanized as Chengoreh, Chongorah, Chongoreh, and Chongorreh; also known as Chahgāreh, Chahkareh, and Changareh Fa’leh Gari) is a village in Gavrud Rural District, in the Central District of Sonqor County, Kermanshah Province, Iran. At the 2006 census, its population was 110, in 21 families.
