= Dar Heydar =

Dar Heydar دارحيدر
- Village
- Location within Iran
- Coordinates: 34°52′19″N 47°39′53″E
- Country: Iran
- Province: Kermanshah
- County: Sonqor
- Bakhsh: Central
- Rural District: Bavaleh

Population (2006)
  - Total: 129
- Time zone: UTC+3:30 (IRST)
  - Summer (DST): UTC+4:30 (IRDT)

Dar Heydar (Persian: دارحيدر, also Romanized as Dār Ḩeydar) is a village in Bavaleh Rural District, in the Central District of Sonqor County, Kermanshah Province, Iran. At the 2006 census, its population was 129, in 25 families.
