= Khanjar (disambiguation) =

The khanjar is a traditional dagger originating from the Sultanate of Oman.

Khanjar may also refer to:

- Khanjali, a dagger from the Caucasus

== Places ==
- Khanjar, Iran, a village in Ardabil province
- Khanjar, Khuzestan, Iran
- Khanjar Bolagh, a village in Qazvin province
- Khanjari, a village in Razavi Khorasan province
- Khanjar Khan, a village in Khoy County, West Azerbaijan province
- Khanjar Qeshlaqi, a village in Urmia County, West Azerbaijan province

== Other ==
- Adham Khanjar (1890–1922), Lebanese Shia Muslim revolutionary and Syrian nationalist
- Khanjar (film), a 1980 Indian Hindi-language film
- INS Khanjar (P47), corvette of the Indian Navy
- IRIS Khanjar, Kaman-class fast attack craft, Iran

== See also ==
- Khanjarabad (disambiguation)
