= Marzban, Iran =

Marzban مرزبان
- Village
- Location within Iran
- Coordinates: 35°01′53″N 47°32′31″E
- Country: Iran
- Province: Kermanshah
- County: Sonqor
- Bakhsh: Central
- Rural District: Gavrud

Population (2006)
  - Total: 183
- Time zone: UTC+3:30 (IRST)
  - Summer (DST): UTC+4:30 (IRDT)

Marzban (Persian: مرزبان, also Romanized as Marzbān) is a village in Gavrud Rural District, in the Central District of Sonqor County, Kermanshah Province, Iran. At the 2006 census, its population was 183, in 34 families.
