= Gheybollah =

Gheybollah غيب اله
- Village
- Location within Iran
- Coordinates: 34°44′08″N 47°31′06″E
- Country: Iran
- Province: Kermanshah
- County: Sonqor
- Bakhsh: Central
- Rural District: Sarab

Population (2006)
  - Total: 98
- Time zone: UTC+3:30 (IRST)
  - Summer (DST): UTC+4:30 (IRDT)

Gheybollah (Persian: غيب اله, also Romanized as Gheybollāh) is a village in Sarab Rural District, in the Central District of Sonqor County, Kermanshah Province, Iran. At the 2006 census, its population was 98, in 22 families.
