= Yargeleh =

Yargeleh يارگله
- Village
- Location within Iran
- Coordinates: 34°47′20″N 47°44′59″E
- Country: Iran
- Province: Kermanshah
- County: Sonqor
- Bakhsh: Central
- Rural District: Ab Barik

Population (2006)
  - Total: 134
- Time zone: UTC+3:30 (IRST)
  - Summer (DST): UTC+4:30 (IRDT)

Yargeleh (Persian: يارگله, also Romanized as Yārgeleh) is a village in Ab Barik Rural District, in the Central District of Sonqor County, Kermanshah Province, Iran. At the 2006 census, its population was 134, among 34 families.
