= Gorgin Darreh =

Gorgin Darreh گرگين دره
- Village
- Location within Iran
- Coordinates: 35°01′58″N 47°28′56″E
- Country: Iran
- Province: Kermanshah
- County: Sonqor
- Bakhsh: Central
- Rural District: Gavrud

Population (2006)
  - Total: 126
- Time zone: UTC+3:30 (IRST)
  - Summer (DST): UTC+4:30 (IRDT)

Gorgin Darreh (Persian: گرگين دره, also Romanized as Gorgīn Darreh; also known as Gorgīn Dar, Gūr-e Qar, and Gur-i-Ghar) is a village in Gavrud Rural District, in the Central District of Sonqor County, Kermanshah Province, Iran. At the 2006 census, its population was 126, in 26 families.
