= Kalbiabad =

Kalbiabad كلبي اباد
- Village
- Location within Iran
- Coordinates: 34°45′54″N 47°48′16″E
- Country: Iran
- Province: Kermanshah
- County: Sonqor
- Bakhsh: Central
- Rural District: Ab Barik

Population (2006)
  - Total: 276
- Time zone: UTC+3:30 (IRST)
  - Summer (DST): UTC+4:30 (IRDT)

Kalbiabad (Persian: كلبي اباد, also Romanized as Kalbīābād) is a village in Ab Barik Rural District, in the Central District of Sonqor County, Kermanshah Province, Iran. At the 2006 census, its population was 276, in 72 families.
