= Gallovij =

Gallovij گلويج
- Village
- Location within Iran
- Coordinates: 34°44′34″N 47°27′35″E
- Country: Iran
- Province: Kermanshah
- County: Sonqor
- Bakhsh: Central
- Rural District: Sarab

Population (2006)
  - Total: 175
- Time zone: UTC+3:30 (IRST)
  - Summer (DST): UTC+4:30 (IRDT)

Gallovij (Persian: گلويج, also Romanized as Gallovīj, Galavīj, Galovīj, and Golavīj) is a village in Sarab Rural District, in the Central District of Sonqor County, Kermanshah Province, Iran. At the 2006 census, its population was 175, in 48 families.
