= Aqbolagh, Kermanshah =

Village in Kermanshah province, Iran

Aqbolagh Persian: اق بلاغ
- Village
- Location within Iran
- Coordinates: 34°44′06″N 47°40′52″E
- Country: Iran
- Province: Kermanshah
- County: Sonqor
- District: Central
- Rural District: Sarab

Population (2016)
  - Total: 623
- Time zone: UTC+3:30 (IRST)

Aqbolagh (Persian: اق بلاغ) (Note: Also romanized as Āq Bolāgh and Āqbolāgh; also known as Āq Bolāq and Āq Bulāq) is a village in Sarab Rural District of the Central District of Sonqor County, Kermanshah province, Iran.

== Demographics ==
=== Population ===
At the time of the 2006 National Census, the village's population was 976 in 212 households. The following census in 2011 counted 801 people in 211 households. The 2016 census measured the population of the village as 623 people in 197 households. It was the most populous village in its rural district.
