= Sar Darreh-ye Beyglar Beygi =

Sar Darreh-ye Beyglar Beygi سردره بيگلربيگي
- Village
- Location within Iran
- Coordinates: 34°45′40″N 47°23′48″E
- Country: Iran
- Province: Kermanshah
- County: Sonqor
- Bakhsh: Central
- Rural District: Sarab

Population (2006)
  - Total: 122
- Time zone: UTC+3:30 (IRST)
  - Summer (DST): UTC+4:30 (IRDT)

Sar Darreh-ye Beyglar Beygi (Persian: سردره بيگلربيگي, also Romanized as Sar Darreh-ye Beyglar Beygī; also known as Sardarreh and Sar Darreh) is a village in Sarab Rural District, in the Central District of Sonqor County, Kermanshah Province, Iran. At the 2006 census, its population was 122, in 29 families.
