= Paizabad, Kermanshah =

Paizabad پاييزاباد
- Village
- Location within Iran
- Coordinates: 35°00′27″N 47°32′07″E
- Country: Iran
- Province: Kermanshah
- County: Sonqor
- Bakhsh: Central
- Rural District: Gavrud

Population (2006)
  - Total: 464
- Time zone: UTC+3:30 (IRST)
  - Summer (DST): UTC+4:30 (IRDT)

Paizabad (Persian: پاييزاباد, also Romanized as Pā’īzābād) is a village in Gavrud Rural District, in the Central District of Sonqor County, Kermanshah Province, Iran. At the 2006 census, its population was 464, in 107 families.
