= Gerdakaneh-ye Olya =

Village in Kermanshah province, Iran

Gerdakaneh-ye Olya Persian: گردكانه عليا
- Village
- Location within Iran
- Coordinates: 35°03′52″N 47°35′01″E
- Country: Iran
- Province: Kermanshah
- County: Sonqor
- District: Bavaleh
- Rural District: Gavrud

Population (2016)
  - Total: 752
- Time zone: UTC+3:30 (IRST)

Gerdakaneh-ye Olya (Persian: گردكانه عليا) (Note: Also romanized as Gerdakāneh-ye ‘Olyā; also known as Gerdeh Kanī-ye Bālā, Gerdkanī-ye Bālā, Gerdkānī-ye ‘Olyā, and Gīrdehkānī Bāla) is a village in Gavrud Rural District of Bavaleh District, Sonqor County, Kermanshah province, Iran.

== Demographics ==
=== Population ===
At the time of the 2006 National Census, the village's population was 1,051 in 253 households, when it was in the Central District. The following census in 2011 counted 943 people in 295 households. The 2016 census measured the population of the village as 752 people in 259 households. It was the most populous village in its rural district.

In 2021, the rural district was separated from the district in the formation of Bavaleh District.
