= Hezar Khani-ye Olya =

Hezar Khani-ye Olya هزارخاني عليا
- Village
- Location within Iran
- Coordinates: 34°54′11″N 47°52′41″E
- Country: Iran
- Province: Kermanshah
- County: Sonqor
- Bakhsh: Central
- Rural District: Bavaleh

Population (2006)
  - Total: 561
- Time zone: UTC+3:30 (IRST)
  - Summer (DST): UTC+4:30 (IRDT)

Hezar Khani-ye Olya (Persian: هزارخاني عليا, also Romanized as Hezār Khānī-ye ‘Olyā and Ḩazār Khānī-ye ‘Olyā; also known as Hazarkham Bala, Hezār Khānī, and Hezār Khānī-ye Bālā) is a village in Bavaleh Rural District, in the Central District of Sonqor County, Kermanshah Province, Iran. At the 2006 census, its population was 561, in 132 families.
