= Khan Jamal-e Zamani =

Khan Jamal-e Zamani خانجمال زماني
- Village
- Location within Iran
- Coordinates: 34°55′21″N 47°38′30″E
- Country: Iran
- Province: Kermanshah
- County: Sonqor
- Bakhsh: Central
- Rural District: Bavaleh

Population (2006)
  - Total: 317
- Time zone: UTC+3:30 (IRST)
  - Summer (DST): UTC+4:30 (IRDT)

Khan Jamal-e Zamani (Persian: خانجمال زماني, also Romanized as Khān Jamāl-e Zamānī and Khānjamāl-e Zamānī) is a village in Bavaleh Rural District, in the Central District of Sonqor County, Kermanshah Province, Iran. At the 2006 census, its population was 317, in 66 families.
