= Khan Jamal-e Panahi =

Khan Jamal-e Panahi خانجمال پناهي
- Village
- Location within Iran
- Coordinates: 34°55′06″N 47°38′12″E
- Country: Iran
- Province: Kermanshah
- County: Sonqor
- Bakhsh: Central
- Rural District: Bavaleh

Population (2006)
  - Total: 330
- Time zone: UTC+3:30 (IRST)
  - Summer (DST): UTC+4:30 (IRDT)

Khan Jamal-e Panahi (Persian: خانجمال پناهي, also Romanized as Khān Jamāl-e Panāhī and Khānjamāl-e Panāhī) is a village in Bavaleh Rural District, in the Central District of Sonqor County, Kermanshah Province, Iran. At the 2006 census, its population was 330, in 70 families.
