= Paizabad =

Paizabad (Persian: پاييزاباد) may refer to:

- Paizabad, Kermanshah
- Paizabad, West Azerbaijan
