= Deh Asiab =

Deh Asiab (Persian: ده اسياب) may refer to:

- Deh Asiab, Sahneh
- Deh Asiab, Sonqor
