= Cheshmeh Kareh =

Cheshmeh Kareh (Persian: چشمه كره) may refer to:

- Cheshmeh Kareh, Sonqor, Kermanshah Province
- Cheshmeh Kareh, Khorramabad, Lorestan Province
