= Choqa Bala-ye Olya =

Choqa Bala-ye Olya چقابالاعليا
- Village
- Location within Iran
- Coordinates: 34°43′06″N 47°47′06″E
- Country: Iran
- Province: Kermanshah
- County: Sonqor
- Bakhsh: Central
- Rural District: Parsinah

Population (2006)
  - Total: 85
- Time zone: UTC+3:30 (IRST)
  - Summer (DST): UTC+4:30 (IRDT)

Choqa Bala-ye Olya (Persian: چقابالاعليا, also Romanized as Choqā Bālā-ye 'Olyā; also known as Choqā-ye Bālā) is a village in Parsinah Rural District, in the Central District of Sonqor County, Kermanshah province, Iran. At the 2006 census, its population was 85, in 20 families.
