= Qaleh Juq, Kermanshah =

Qaleh Juq قلعه جوق
- Village
- Location within Iran
- Coordinates: 34°54′11″N 47°32′42″E
- Country: Iran
- Province: Kermanshah
- County: Sonqor
- Bakhsh: Central
- Rural District: Gavrud

Population (2006)
  - Total: 54
- Time zone: UTC+3:30 (IRST)
  - Summer (DST): UTC+4:30 (IRDT)

Qaleh Juq (Persian: قلعه جوق, also Romanized as Qal‘eh Jūq; also known as Khalajān, Khalajūn, Khiljān, and Qal‘eh Joq) is a village in Gavrud Rural District, in the Central District of Sonqor County, Kermanshah Province, Iran. At the 2006 census, its population was 54, in 12 families.
