= Gerdakaneh-ye Sofla =

Village in Kermanshah, Iran

Gerdakaneh-ye Sofla گردكانه سفلي
- Village
- Location within Iran
- Coordinates: 35°00′45″N 47°35′00″E
- Country: Iran
- Province: Kermanshah
- County: Sonqor
- Bakhsh: Central
- Rural District: Gavrud

Population (2006)
  - Total: 435
- Time zone: UTC+3:30 (IRST)
  - Summer (DST): UTC+4:30 (IRDT)

Gerdakaneh-ye Sofla (Persian: گردكانه سفلي, also Romanized as Gerdakāneh-ye Soflá; also known as Gerda Kāneh-ye Pā’īn, Gerdeh Kāneh-ye Soflá, Gerdeh Kānī-ye Pā’īn, Gerdkānī-ye Pā’īn, Gerdkānī-ye Soflá, and Gīrdehkanī Pāīn) is a village in Gavrud Rural District, in the Central District of Sonqor County, Kermanshah Province, Iran. At the 2006 census, its population was 435, in 97 families.
