= Meykharan-e Pir Ali Khan =

Meykhvaran-e Pir Ali Khan ميخواران پيرعليخان
- Village
- Location within Iran
- Coordinates: 35°01′08″N 47°41′26″E
- Country: Iran
- Province: Kermanshah
- County: Sonqor
- Bakhsh: Central
- Rural District: Bavaleh

Population (2006)
  - Total: 275
- Time zone: UTC+3:30 (IRST)
  - Summer (DST): UTC+4:30 (IRDT)

Meykhvaran-e Pir Ali Khan (Persian: ميخواران پيرعليخان, also Romanized as Meykhvārān-e Pīr ‘Alī Khān; also known as Maekharān, Makhrān, Meykhowrān-e Farmānfarmā, Meykhvārān-e Farmānfarmā, Meykhvorān-e Farmān Farmā, and Pīr Meykhvārān-e Pīr ‘Alī Khān) is a village in Bavaleh Rural District, in the Central District of Sonqor County, Kermanshah Province, Iran. At the 2006 census, its population was 275, consisting of 53 families.
