= Qaleh-ye Farhad Khan =

Qaleh-ye Farhad Khan قلعه فرهادخان
- Village
- Location within Iran
- Coordinates: 34°47′57″N 47°37′11″E
- Country: Iran
- Province: Kermanshah
- County: Sonqor
- Bakhsh: Central
- Rural District: Ab Barik

Population (2006)
  - Total: 400
- Time zone: UTC+3:30 (IRST)
  - Summer (DST): UTC+4:30 (IRDT)

Qaleh-ye Farhad Khan (Persian: قلعه فرهادخان, also Romanized as Qal‘eh-ye Farhād Khān; also known as Qal‘eh-ye Farhād Khānād) is a village in Ab Barik Rural District, in the Central District of Sonqor County, Kermanshah Province, Iran. At the 2006 census, its population was 400, in 97 families.

A closely related variant of the Sonqori dialect is spoken in the village.
