= Gaznahleh =

Village in Kermanshah province, Iran

Gaznahleh Persian: گزنهله
- Village
- Location within Iran
- Coordinates: 34°45′03″N 47°33′20″E
- Country: Iran
- Province: Kermanshah
- County: Sonqor
- District: Central
- Rural District: Sarab

Population (2016)
  - Total: 527
- Time zone: UTC+3:30 (IRST)

Gaznahleh (Persian: گزنهله) (Note: Also romanized as Gaz Nahleh; also known as Ganzaleh and Gaznahād) is a village in, and the capital of, Sarab Rural District of the Central District of Sonqor County, Kermanshah province, Iran.

== Demographics ==
=== Population ===
At the time of the 2006 National Census, the village's population was 638 in 175 households. The following census in 2011 counted 587 people in 193 households. The 2016 census measured the population of the village as 527 people in 176 households.
