= Charmaleh-ye Olya =

Charmaleh-ye Olya چرمله عليا
- Village
- Location within Iran
- Coordinates: 35°00′02″N 47°46′09″E
- Country: Iran
- Province: Kermanshah
- County: Sonqor
- Bakhsh: Central
- Rural District: Bavaleh

Population (2006)
  - Total: 386
- Time zone: UTC+3:30 (IRST)
  - Summer (DST): UTC+4:30 (IRDT)

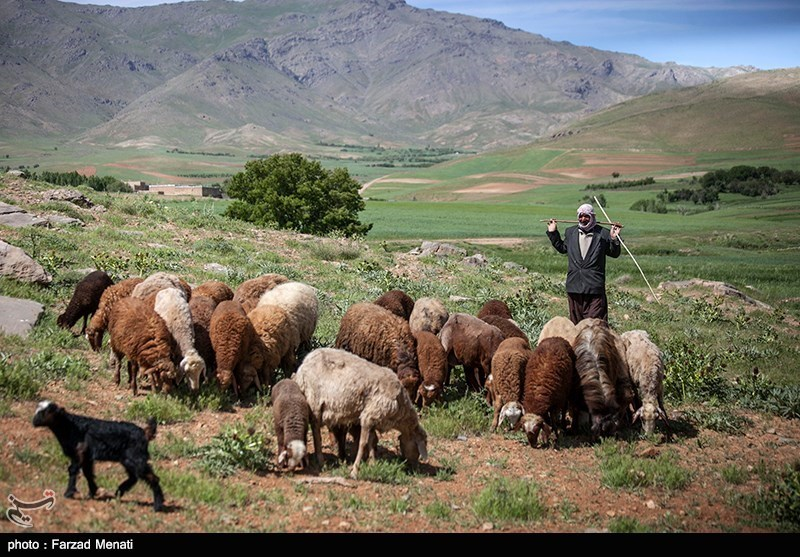
Sheep herder in Charmaleh-ye Olya

Charmaleh-ye Olya (Persian: چرمله عليا, also Romanized as Charmaleh-ye 'Olyā; also known as Charmaleh-ye Bālā) is a village in Bavaleh Rural District, in the Central District of Sonqor County, Kermanshah province, Iran. At the 2006 census, its population was 386, in 81 families.
