= Khiaran, Kermanshah =

Khiaran خياران
- Village
- Location within Iran
- Coordinates: 34°43′13″N 47°29′07″E
- Country: Iran
- Province: Kermanshah
- County: Sonqor
- Bakhsh: Central
- Rural District: Sarab

Population (2006)
  - Total: 307
- Time zone: UTC+3:30 (IRST)
  - Summer (DST): UTC+4:30 (IRDT)

Khiaran (Persian: خياران, also Romanized as Khīārān and Kheyārān; also known as Ḩīārān) is a village in Sarab Rural District, in the Central District of Sonqor County, Kermanshah Province, Iran. At the 2006 census, its population was 307, in 67 families.
