= Hezar Khani-ye Sofla =

Hezar Khani-ye Sofla هزارخاني سفلي
- Village
- Location within Iran
- Coordinates: 34°51′57″N 47°49′58″E
- Country: Iran
- Province: Kermanshah
- County: Sonqor
- Bakhsh: Central
- Rural District: Bavaleh

Population (2006)
  - Total: 408
- Time zone: UTC+3:30 (IRST)
  - Summer (DST): UTC+4:30 (IRDT)

Hezar Khani-ye Sofla (Persian: هزارخاني سفلي, also Romanized as Hezār Khānī-ye Soflá) is a village in Bavaleh Rural District, in the Central District of Sonqor County, Kermanshah Province, Iran. At the 2006 census, its population was 408, in 87 families.
