= Sahanleh =

Village in Kermanshah province, Iran

Sahanleh Persian: سهنله
- Village
- Location within Iran
- Coordinates: 34°50′03″N 47°39′16″E
- Country: Iran
- Province: Kermanshah
- County: Sonqor
- District: Central
- Rural District: Ab Barik

Population (2016)
  - Total: 1,224
- Time zone: UTC+3:30 (IRST)

Sahanleh (Persian: سهنله) is a village in Ab Barik Rural District of the Central District of Sonqor County, Kermanshah province, Iran.

== Demographics ==
=== Population ===
At the time of the 2006 National Census, the village's population was 1,839 in 422 households. The following census in 2011 counted 1,612 people in 429 households. The 2016 census measured the population of the village as 1,224 people in 377 households. It was the most populous village in its rural district.
