= Meykharan-e Sadat =

Meykhvaran-e Sadat ميخواران سادات
- Village
- Location within Iran
- Coordinates: 35°00′00″N 47°42′26″E
- Country: Iran
- Province: Kermanshah
- County: Sonqor
- Bakhsh: Central
- Rural District: Bavaleh

Population (2006)
  - Total: 28
- Time zone: UTC+3:30 (IRST)
  - Summer (DST): UTC+4:30 (IRDT)

Meykhvaran-e Sadat (Persian: ميخواران سادات, also Romanized as Meykhvārān-e Sādāt, Meykhowrān-e Sādāt, and Meykhvorān-e Sādāt; also known as Meykhowrān-e Bālā) is a village in Bavaleh Rural District, in the Central District of Sonqor County, Kermanshah Province, Iran. At the 2006 census, its population was 28, in 7 families.
