= Choqa Bala =

Choqa Bala or Choqa-ye Bala (Persian: چقابالا) may refer to:

- Choqa Bala-ye Olya
- Choqa Bala-ye Sofla
