= Bavaleh =

Village in Kermanshah province, Iran

Bavaleh Persian: باوله
- Village
- Location within Iran
- Coordinates: 34°53′26″N 47°43′06″E
- Country: Iran
- Province: Kermanshah
- County: Sonqor
- District: Bavaleh
- Rural District: Bavaleh

Population (2016)
  - Total: 1,080
- Time zone: UTC+3:30 (IRST)

Bavaleh (Persian: باوله) (Note: Also romanized as Bāvaleh; also known as Bāvaleh-ye Fa‘leh Korī and Bāwali) is a village in Bavaleh Rural District of Bavaleh District, Sonqor County, Kermanshah province, Iran, serving as capital of both the district and the rural district.

== Demographics ==
=== Population ===
At the time of the 2006 National Census, the village's population was 1,320 in 299 households, when it was in the Central District. The following census in 2011 counted 1,507 people in 356 households. The 2016 census measured the population of the village as 1,080 people in 281 households. It was the most populous village in its rural district.

In 2021, the rural district was separated from the district in the formation of Bavaleh District.
