= Charmaleh =

Charmaleh (Persian: چرمله), also rendered as Chalmala and Chalmaleh, may refer to:

- Charmaleh-ye Olya
- Charmaleh-ye Sofla
