= Khanjarabad, Kermanshah =

Khanjarabad خنجراباد
- Village
- Location within Iran
- Coordinates: 34°46′06″N 47°31′06″E
- Country: Iran
- Province: Kermanshah
- County: Sonqor
- Bakhsh: Central
- Rural District: Sarab

Population (2006)
  - Total: 171
- Time zone: UTC+3:30 (IRST)
  - Summer (DST): UTC+4:30 (IRDT)

Khanjarabad (Persian: خنجراباد, also Romanized as Khanjarābād) is a village in Sarab Rural District, in the Central District of Sonqor County, Kermanshah Province, Iran. At the 2006 census, its population was 171, in 41 families.
