= Tappeh Rash =

Tappeh Rash or Tappeh-ye Rash (Persian: تپه رش) may refer to:

- Tappeh Rash, Ravansar, Kermanshah Province
- Tappeh Rash, Salas-e Babajani, Kermanshah Province
- Tappeh Rash, Sonqor, Kermanshah Province
- Tappeh Rash, West Azerbaijan
