= Charmaleh-ye Sofla =

Charmaleh-ye Sofla چرمله سفلي
- Village
- Location within Iran
- Coordinates: 34°58′11″N 47°44′43″E
- Country: Iran
- Province: Kermanshah
- County: Sonqor
- Bakhsh: Central
- Rural District: Bavaleh

Population (2006)
  - Total: 861
- Time zone: UTC+3:30 (IRST)
  - Summer (DST): UTC+4:30 (IRDT)

Charmaleh-ye Sofla (Persian: چرمله سفلي, also Romanized as Charmaleh-ye Soflá; also known as Chalmala Pain, Chalmaleh Pāīn, Charmaleh, and Charmaleh-ye Pā‘īn) is a village in Bavaleh Rural District, in the Central District of Sonqor County, Kermanshah province, Iran. At the 2006 census, its population was 861, in 193 families.
