= Cham Cham, Iran =

Cham Cham چم چم
- Village
- Location within Iran
- Coordinates: 34°40′34″N 47°45′50″E
- Country: Iran
- Province: Kermanshah
- County: Sonqor
- Bakhsh: Central
- Rural District: Parsinah

Population (2006)
  - Total: 341
- Time zone: UTC+3:30 (IRST)
  - Summer (DST): UTC+4:30 (IRDT)

Cham Cham (Persian: چم چم) is a village in Parsinah Rural District, in the Central District of Sonqor County, Kermanshah Province, Iran. At the 2006 census, its population was 341, in 78 families.
