= Khan Jamal, Iran =

Khan Jamal or Khanjamal (Persian: خانجمال) may refer to:

- Khan Jamal-e Panahi
- Khan Jamal-e Zamani
