= Sar Darreh-ye Qobadi =

Sar Darreh-ye Qobadi سردره قبادي
- Village
- Location within Iran
- Coordinates: 35°02′52″N 47°37′56″E
- Country: Iran
- Province: Kermanshah
- County: Sonqor
- Bakhsh: Central
- Rural District: Gavrud

Population (2006)
  - Total: 150
- Time zone: UTC+3:30 (IRST)
  - Summer (DST): UTC+4:30 (IRDT)

Sar Darreh-ye Qobadi (Persian: سردره قبادي, also Romanized as Sar Darreh-ye Qobādī; also known as Sardāreh and Sar Darreh) is a village in Gavrud Rural District, in the Central District of Sonqor County, Kermanshah Province, Iran. At the 2006 census, its population was 150, in 37 families.
