= Chowgan, Kermanshah =

Chowgan چوگان
- Village
- Location within Iran
- Coordinates: 34°53′56″N 47°46′42″E
- Country: Iran
- Province: Kermanshah
- County: Sonqor
- Bakhsh: Central
- Rural District: Bavaleh

Population (2006)
  - Total: 338
- Time zone: UTC+3:30 (IRST)
  - Summer (DST): UTC+4:30 (IRDT)

Chowgan (Persian: چوگان, also Romanized as Chowgān; also known as Chauga, Chaugen, and Chowgān-e Fa‘leh Korī) is a village in Bavaleh Rural District, in the Central District of Sonqor County, Kermanshah province, Iran. At the 2006 census, its population was 338, in 72 families.
