= Cheshmeh Kareh, Sonqor =

Cheshmeh Kareh چشمه كره
- Village
- Location within Iran
- Coordinates: 35°03′51″N 47°32′39″E
- Country: Iran
- Province: Kermanshah
- County: Sonqor
- Bakhsh: Central
- Rural District: Gavrud

Population (2006)
  - Total: 78
- Time zone: UTC+3:30 (IRST)
  - Summer (DST): UTC+4:30 (IRDT)

Cheshmeh Kareh (Persian: چشمه كره) is a village in Gavrud Rural District, in the Central District of Sonqor County, Kermanshah Province, Iran. At the 2006 census, its population was 78, in 19 families.
