= Khiaran =

Khiaran or Kheyaran (Persian: خياران) may refer to:

- Khiaran, Kermanshah
- Khiaran, Lorestan
