= Ab Barik-e Sofla =

Ab Barik-e Sofla (Persian: آب باریک سفلی) or Ab Barik-e Pain (Persian: آب باریک پایین), both meaning "lower Ab Barik" may refer to:

- Ab Barik-e Sofla, Kermanshah
- Ab Barik-e Sofla, Aligudarz, Lorestan Province
- Ab Barik-e Sofla, Selseleh, Lorestan Province
- Ab Barik-e Sofla, Razavi Khorasan
