= Deh Asiab, Sonqor =

Deh Asiab ده اسياب
- Village
- Location within Iran
- Coordinates: 34°39′44″N 47°41′24″E
- Country: Iran
- Province: Kermanshah
- County: Sonqor
- Bakhsh: Central
- Rural District: Parsinah

Population (2006)
  - Total: 200
- Time zone: UTC+3:30 (IRST)
  - Summer (DST): UTC+4:30 (IRDT)

Deh Asiab (Persian: ده اسياب, also Romanized as Deh Āsīāb) is a village in Parsinah Rural District, in the Central District of Sonqor County, Kermanshah Province, Iran. At the 2006 census, its population was 200, in 47 families.
