= Choqa Bala-ye Sofla =

Choqa Bala-ye Sofla چقابالاسفلي
- Village
- Location within Iran
- Coordinates: 34°43′00″N 47°46′00″E
- Country: Iran
- Province: Kermanshah
- County: Sonqor
- Bakhsh: Central
- Rural District: Parsinah

Population (2006)
  - Total: 241
- Time zone: UTC+3:30 (IRST)
  - Summer (DST): UTC+4:30 (IRDT)

Choqa Bala-ye Sofla (Persian: چقابالاسفلي, also Romanized as Choqā Bālā-ye Soflá) is a village in Parsinah Rural District, in the Central District of Sonqor County, Kermanshah Province, Iran. At the 2006 census, its population was 241, in 57 families.
