= Jan Ahmad =

Jan Ahmad (Persian: جان احمد) may refer to:

- Jan Ahmad, Isfahan
- Jan Ahmad, Kermanshah
- Jan Ahmad, South Khorasan
