= Ab Barik-e Olya =

Ab Barik-e Olya (Persian: ابباريك عليا) may refer to:

- Ab Barik-e Olya, Kermanshah
- Ab Barik-e Olya, Aligudarz, Lorestan Province
- Ab Barik-e Olya, Selseleh, Lorestan Province
- Ab Barik-e Olya, Razavi Khorasan

== See also ==
- Ab Barik-e Bala
