= Ab Barik-e Vosta =

Ab Barik-e Vosta اب باريك وسطي
- Village
- Location within Iran
- Coordinates: 34°51′22″N 47°44′47″E
- Country: Iran
- Province: Kermanshah
- County: Sonqor
- Bakhsh: Central
- Rural District: Ab Barik

Population (2006)
  - Total: 29
- Time zone: UTC+3:30 (IRST)
  - Summer (DST): UTC+4:30 (IRDT)

Ab Barik-e Vosta (Persian: اب باريك وسطي, also Romanized as Āb Bārīk-e Vosţá; also known as Āb Bārīk-e Vasaţ) is a village in Ab Barik Rural District, in the Central District of Sonqor County, Kermanshah Province, Iran. At the 2006 census, its population was 29, in 8 families.
