= Meykharan-e Pain =

Meykhvaran-e Pain or Meykhvoran-e Pain or Meykhowran-e Pain (Persian: ميخواران پائين) may refer to:

- Meykhvaran-e Mohammad Aqa
- Meykhvaran-e Mohammad Sadeq
