= Khalajan =

Khalajan or Khelejan or Kheljan (Persian: خلجان) may refer to:

- Khelejan, East Azerbaijan
- Khalajan, Kermanshah
- Khalajan, Gavrud, Kermanshah Province
