= Khanjarabad =

Khanjarabad (Persian: خنجراباد) may refer to:

- Khanjarabad, Hamadan
- Khanjarabad, Kermanshah

== See also ==
- Khanjar (disambiguation)
