= Barik Ab =

Barik Ab or Barikab (Persian: باريك اب), also rendered as Barkab, may refer to:

- Barik Ab, Khuzestan
- Barik Ab, Ijrud, Zanjan Province
- Barik Ab, Khodabandeh, Zanjan Province

== See also ==
- Ab Barik (disambiguation)
