= Meykharan-e Mohammad Aqa =

Meykhvaran-e Mohammad Aqa ميخواران محمداقا
- Village
- Location within Iran
- Coordinates: 34°59′21″N 47°41′10″E
- Country: Iran
- Province: Kermanshah
- County: Sonqor
- Bakhsh: Central
- Rural District: Bavaleh

Population (2006)
  - Total: 292
- Time zone: UTC+3:30 (IRST)
  - Summer (DST): UTC+4:30 (IRDT)

Meykhvaran-e Mohammad Aqa (Persian: ميخواران محمداقا, also Romanized as Meykhvārān-e Moḩammad Āqā, Meykhowrān-e Moḩammad Āqā, and Meykhvorān-e Moḩammad Āqā; also known as Maikhorané Mohammad Aghā, Mey Khārān, Meykhowrān-e Pā’īn, and Meykhvorān) is a village in Bavaleh Rural District, in the Central District of Sonqor County, Kermanshah Province, Iran. At the 2006 census, its population was 292, in 60 families.
