= Sornabad =

Sornabad (Persian: سرناباد) may refer to:

- Sornabad, Kermanshah
- Sornabad Rural District, in Fars Province
