= Farsinaj-e Jadid =

Village in Kermanshah province, Iran

Farsinaj-e Jadid Persian: فارسينج جديد
- Village
- Location within Iran
- Coordinates: 34°42′23″N 47°43′35″E
- Country: Iran
- Province: Kermanshah
- County: Sonqor
- District: Central
- Rural District: Parsinah

Population (2016)
  - Total: 2,004
- Time zone: UTC+3:30 (IRST)

Farsinaj-e Jadid (Persian: فارسينج جديد) (Note: Also romanized as Fārsīnaj-e Jadīd; also known as Farsīkh, Fārsīnaj, and Fārsīneh) is a village in, and the capital of, Parsinah Rural District of the Central District of Sonqor County, Kermanshah province, Iran.

== Demographics ==
=== Population ===
At the time of the 2006 National Census, the village's population was 2,287 in 559 households. The following census in 2011 counted 2,355 people in 663 households. The 2016 census measured the population of the village as 2,004 people in 639 households. It was the most populous village in its rural district.
