= Chauga =

Chauga may refer to:

- Chauga, Iran, village in Kermanshah Province, Iran
- Chauga River, in South Carolina, USA
- Chauga Mound, historic site in South Carolina, USA
