= Cham Cham =

Cham Cham

- Cham Cham, Iran, a village in Kermanshah Province, Iran
- "The Cham-Cham", a 1966 episode of the TV series Thunderbirds
- Cham cham, a Bengali sweet
- Cham Cham, a character in the game series Samurai Shodown

== See also ==
- "Cham Cham Kare", a song by Rajesh Roshan and Asha Bhosle from the 1977 Indian film Priyatama
