= Qorveh, Kermanshah =

Qorveh قروه
- Village
- Location within Iran
- Coordinates: 34°45′46″N 47°32′57″E
- Country: Iran
- Province: Kermanshah
- County: Sonqor
- Bakhsh: Central
- Rural District: Sarab

Population (2006)
  - Total: 199
- Time zone: UTC+3:30 (IRST)
  - Summer (DST): UTC+4:30 (IRDT)

Qorveh (Persian: قروه) is a village in Sarab Rural District, in the Central District of Sonqor County, Kermanshah Province, Iran. At the 2006 census, its population was 199, in 59 families.

A closely related variant of the Sonqori dialect is spoken in the village.
