= Zanjani dialect =

Azerbaijani Turkish dialect

- زنگان لهجه‌سی
- Native to: Iran; Zanjan province
- Region: Majority: Zanjan province Minority: Kurdistan province (Bijar County)
- Language family: Altaic: Turkic; Oghuz; Azerbaijani language; Zanjani dialect

Language codes
- ISO 639-3: -
- Glottolog: zanj1239

Zanjani dialect is a dialect of Azerbaijani Turkish spoken in the city of Zanjan and its surrounding areas. This dialect begins in Tarom and extends to the city of Zanjan, Hidaj, Soltanieh, Khodabandeh, Mahneshan, and the cities of Bijar and Qorveh in Kurdistan Province. Zanjani Turkish also has similarities to Sonqori Turkish in Kermanshah Province. The Zanjani dialect in the eastern and southern regions of Zanjan Province, such as Qeydar, is closer to Hamedani Turkish. In general, this dialect can be considered a mixture of Old and New Turkish.
