= Meykharan-e Mohammad Sadeq =

Meykhvaran-e Mohammad Sadeq ميخواران محمدصادق
- Village
- Location within Iran
- Coordinates: 34°57′31″N 47°42′27″E
- Country: Iran
- Province: Kermanshah
- County: Sonqor
- Bakhsh: Central
- Rural District: Bavaleh

Population (2006)
  - Total: 235
- Time zone: UTC+3:30 (IRST)
  - Summer (DST): UTC+4:30 (IRDT)

Meykhvaran-e Mohammad Sadeq (Persian: ميخواران محمدصادق, also Romanized as Meykhvārān-e Moḩammad Şādeq and Meykhowrān-e Moḩammad Şādeq; also known as Mae Khuran, Maykhurān Pāīn, Meykhowrān-e Pā’īn, and Meykhvārān-e Pā’īn) is a village in Bavaleh Rural District, in the Central District of Sonqor County, Kermanshah Province, Iran. At the 2006 census, its population was 235, in 53 families.
