= Ab Barik-e Sofla, Kermanshah =

Ab Barik-e Sofla آب باریک سفلی
- Village
- Location within Iran
- Coordinates: 34°52′09″N 47°44′37″E
- Country: Iran
- Province: Kermanshah
- County: Sonqor
- Bakhsh: Central
- Rural District: Bavaleh

Population (2006)
  - Total: 50
- Time zone: UTC+3:30 (IRST)
  - Summer (DST): UTC+4:30 (IRDT)

Ab Barik-e Sofla (Persian: آب باریک سفلی, also Romanized as Āb Bārīk-e Soflá; also known as Āb Bārīk-e Pā‘īn) is a village in Bavaleh Rural District, in the Central District of Sonqor County, Kermanshah Province, Iran. At the 2006 census, its population was 50, in 13 families.
