= Malek Tomb =

Historic tomb in Sonqor, Iran

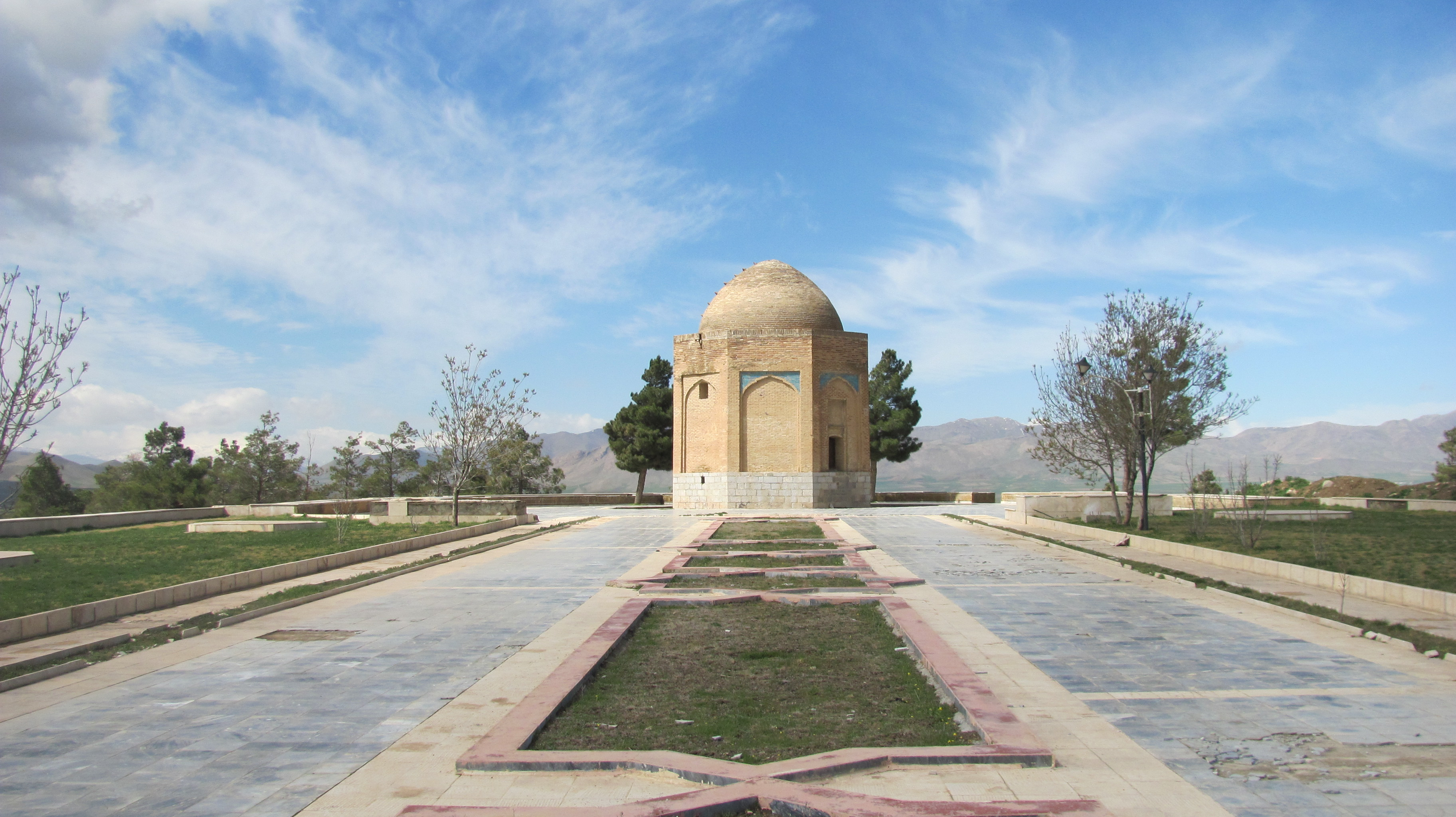
- Interactive map of the Malek Tomb area

General information
- Location: Sonqor, Iran

Malek Tomb (Persian: آرامگاه مالک) is a tower-like, octagonal, probably Ilkhanid tomb located on a hill in the center of Sonqor in Kermanshah province, Iran. The upper part of the tomb is built out of brick; the base is made of hewn stone.
