= Ab Barik-e Olya, Kermanshah =

Village in Kermanshah province, Iran

Ab Barik-e Olya Persian: آب‌ باریک علیا
- Village
- Location within Iran
- Coordinates: 34°49′24″N 47°45′30″E
- Country: Iran
- Province: Kermanshah
- County: Sonqor
- District: Central
- Rural District: Ab Barik

Population (2016)
  - Total: 189
- Time zone: UTC+3:30 (IRST)

Ab Barik-e Olya (Persian: آب‌ باریک علیا) (Note: Also romanized as Āb Bārīk-e ‘Olyā; also known as Āb Bārīk, Āb Bārīk-e Seyāh Kamar, Āb Bārīk Sīāh Kamar, and Āb-e Bārīk) is a village in, and the capital of, Ab Barik Rural District of the Central District of Sonqor County, Kermanshah province, Iran.

== Demographics ==
=== Population ===
At the time of the 2006 National Census, the village's population was 342 in 83 households. The following census in 2011 counted 280 people in 77 households. The 2016 census measured the population of the village as 189 people in 58 households.
