= Kolya'i (tribe) =

Kurdish tribe in Iran

Kolya'i (Kurdish: کولیایی, Kulyayî, Persian: کلیایی) is a large Kurdish tribe living mostly in western Iran. They speak the Kolya'i dialect of Southern Kurdish and are religiously diverse.

== History ==
The Kolya'i tribe emerged relatively later than the other southern Kurdish tribes, and they were not mentioned among the major southern Kurdish tribes listed by Sharafkhan Bidlisi in the Sharafnama. Kolya'i leaders claimed that their ancestor was Safi Khan who lived in the later Safavid period. Historical sources first mentioned the Kolya'i tribe while recording their activities in conjunction with tribal disputes over the national throne during the late Zand era. The main Kolya'i representative, Ali-Hemmat Khan, and his brother Nasir Khan, played a significant role in supporting Lotf-Ali Khan Zand. As a punishment, Ali-Hemmat Khan and his brother Baba Khan were executed in 1798 by Fath-Ali Shah Qajar. A few years later, in 1807, Jean-Baptiste Louis-Jacques Rousseau compiled a list of southern Kurdish tribes in Kermanshah, and listed the Kolya'i, Kalhor, Mafi, Karku'i, Jalilwand, and the Sufiwand, which later became part of the Kolya'i. The Kolya'i historically appeared in lists of Kurdish and Lak tribes, and Erhard Franz clarified that they were a Lak tribe and considered Kurds. An 18th century poet who wrote in Gorani, Mirza Safi Kolya'i, was included in a list of the most important writers and poets of classical Kurdish literature, compiled by Amir Hassanpour.

Major Trevor Chichele Plowden, when passing through Kermanshah in 1881, wrote that the Kolya'i tribe was wealthy before it was ruined by the exactions of Aliqoli Mirza Sarram al-Dawla, who was a grandson of Mohammad-Ali Mirza Dowlatshah, and had been appointed governor of the Kolya'i and Sonqor district. H. L. Rabino wrote about both the Kolya'i tribe and district in 1907, and identified 150 villages there, averaging around 30 houses per village. The Kolya'i tribe consisted of 4,000 families in total, and had extensive pasturages, grain cultivation, and many small and hardy horses and mules. The women mostly specialized in weaving carpets. The Kolya'i tribe was famous in Iran for its carpets, and "Kolya'i" was often used as a general label for all carpets woven in Iranian Kurdistan. Rabino wrote that the tribe was divided into eight branches: Begvand (including the Zaman clan), Falehkouri, Falehkouri Shirazi, Sorkhabi Falehkouri, Musiavand, Musiavand Araqi, Musiavand Shirazi, and Sufivand. The "Shirazi" label likely referred to Kurdish tribes which were settled in Shiraz under Karim Khan Zand and returned to their native lands after. The Kolya'i were also likely among the Kurdish tribes deported to the Varamin region by the Qajars.

The Kolya'i tribe, along with other southern Kurdish tribes, played a big role in the affairs of Kermanshah during World War I. They joined the Kurdish tribal army along with the Sanjabi, Kalhor, and Guran tribes. For over a century, the leaders of the Kolya'i tribe came from its three biggest clans, the Begvand, Musiavand, and Sufivand. There were tribal conflicts which continued in the political upheavals of the 1940s. During the same period, the famous journalist Fattah Amiri Kolya'i launched the leftist newspaper "Bakhtaran". Mansur Yaquti also emerged in the field of Iranian literature, and he was also Kolya'i and often published in his native Kurdish dialect.

The Kolya'i tribe spoke the Kolya'i dialect of southern Kurdish. Fattah outlined the Kolya'i dialect in northern and eastern Kermanshah province, as well as Chaharduli-ye-Gharbi in Qorveh County in Kurdistan province, and in the counties of Asadabad, Hamadan, Tuyserkan, and Malayer in Hamadan province. There was also a southern Kurdish dialect spoken in Qorveh which was called Chardawri, or Chahardawli, and was named after Chardavol in Ilam province where its speakers claimed to have originated before migrating northwards. It was called "Chardawri" and "Kolya'i" interchangeably by its speakers, as their dialect was very close to the neighboring Kolya'i dialects spoken in Kermanshah.

Kolya'i was centered in Sonqor County where its speakers made up the majority. Minorsky wrote that the district of Sonqor was made up of Kolya'i Kurds and Sonqori Turks, with the Kurds populating the district of Sonqor and the Turks being concentrated in the town of Sonqor, which had a population of 37,772 in 1991. The Sonqori Turks reportedly came during the Mongol period in Iran, with their chief, Sonqor, ruling the region as a vassal of the Mongols of Shiraz, although the Kolya'i tribe later ruled the region until the end of the Qajar rule. Later, the Kolya'i increasingly migrated to the town of Sonqor for better opportunities and settled.

The Kolya'i tribe was religiously diverse and were considered Shia Muslims by Rabino, although Vladimir Minorsky suggested they had Yarsani tendencies, a view shared by Gholamhossein Mosaheb. Ismail Fattah claimed that the Kolya'i were mostly Shia with a Yarsani minority, while Mehrdad Izady claimed they were Sunni.
