= Ab Barik, Sarpol-e Zahab =

Ab Barik اب باريك
- Village
- Location within Iran
- Coordinates: 34°26′13″N 45°48′29″E
- Country: Iran
- Province: Kermanshah
- County: Sarpol-e Zahab
- Bakhsh: Central
- Rural District: Howmeh-ye Sarpol

Population (2006)
  - Total: 251
- Time zone: UTC+3:30 (IRST)
  - Summer (DST): UTC+4:30 (IRDT)

Ab Barik (Persian: اب باريك, also Romanized as Āb Bārīk) is a village in Howmeh-ye Sarpol Rural District, in the Central District of Sarpol-e Zahab County, Kermanshah province, Iran. At the 2006 census, its population was 251, in 57 families.
