= Hezar Khani, Kurdistan =

Hezar Khani هزارخانی
- Village
- Location within Iran
- Coordinates: 35°21′18″N 46°22′00″E
- Country: Iran
- Province: Kurdistan
- County: Sarvabad
- Bakhsh: Central
- Rural District: Kusalan

Population (2017)
  - Total: 924
- Time zone: UTC+3:30 (IRST)
  - Summer (DST): UTC+4:30 (IRDT)

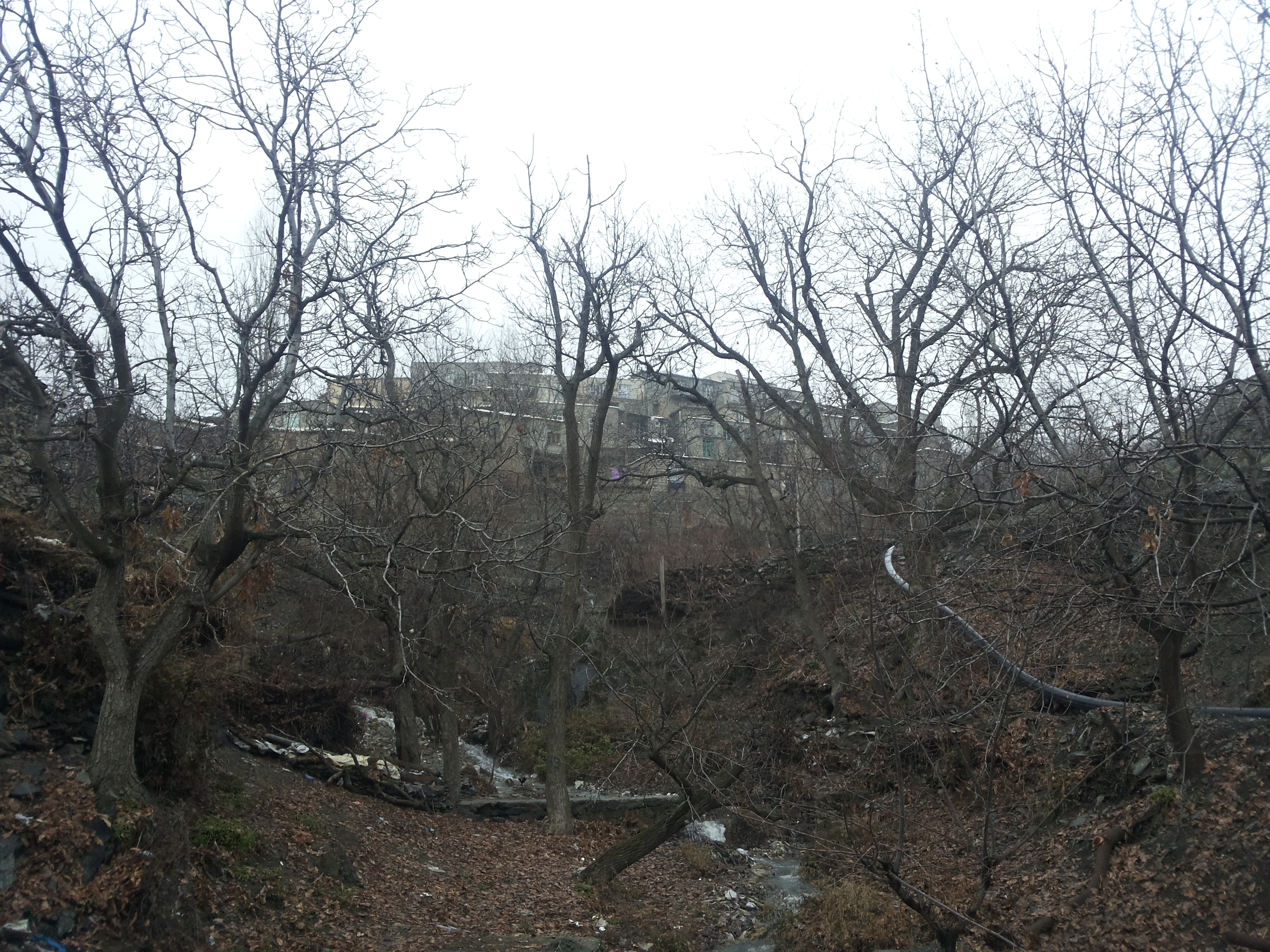
Hezar Khani

Hezar Khani (Persian: هزارخانی, also Romanized as Hezār Khānī, Hazār Khāneh, and Hazār Khānī) is a village in Kusalan Rural District, in the Central District of Sarvabad County, Kurdistan province, Iran. At the 2017 census, its population was 924, in 250 families. The village is populated by Kurds.
