= Ab Barik, Qazvin =

Ab Barik آب باریک
- Village
- Location within Iran
- Coordinates: 35°41′30″N 50°11′31″E
- Country: Iran
- Province: Qazvin
- County: Buin Zahra
- Bakhsh: Central
- Rural District: Zahray-ye Pain

Population (2006)
  - Total: 369
- Time zone: UTC+3:30 (IRST)
  - Summer (DST): UTC+4:30 (IRDT)

Ab Barik (Persian: آب باریک, also Romanized as Āb Bārīk, Abarik, and Ābbārīk) is a village in Zahray-ye Pain Rural District, in the Central District of Buin Zahra County, Qazvin province, Iran. At the 2006 census, its population was 369, in 105 families.
