= Khanjar Bolagh =

Khanjar Bolagh خنجربلاغ
- Village
- Location within Iran
- Coordinates: 36°24′43″N 50°12′30″E
- Country: Iran
- Province: Qazvin
- County: Qazvin
- Bakhsh: Alamut-e Gharbi
- Rural District: Rudbar-e Mohammad-e Zamani

Population (2006)
  - Total: 62
- Time zone: UTC+3:30 (IRST)
  - Summer (DST): UTC+4:30 (IRDT)
- Website: https://instagram.com/khanjarboulagh?igshid=4i27vxq44k4g

Khanjar Bolagh (Persian: خنجربلاغ, also Romanized as Khanjar Bolāgh) is a village in Rudbar-e Mohammad-e Zamani Rural District, Alamut-e Gharbi District, Qazvin County, Qazvin Province, Iran. At the 2006 census, its population was 62, in 19 families.
