= Ab Barik, Qorveh =

Ab Barik آب باريك
- Village
- Location within Iran
- Coordinates: 34°59′40″N 48°04′24″E
- Country: Iran
- Province: Kurdistan
- County: Qorveh
- Bakhsh: Chaharduli
- Rural District: Chaharduli-ye Sharqi

Population (2006)
  - Total: 486
- Time zone: UTC+3:30 (IRST)
  - Summer (DST): UTC+4:30 (IRDT)

Ab Barik (Persian: آب باريك, also Romanized as Āb Bārīk and Āb-i-Bārīk) is a village in Chaharduli-ye Sharqi Rural District, Chaharduli District, Qorveh County, Kurdistan province, Iran. At the 2006 census, its population was 486, in 116 families. The village is populated by Kurds.
