= Gerdakaneh, Kermanshah =

Gerdakaneh گردكانه
- Village
- Location within Iran
- Coordinates: 34°34′16″N 47°58′19″E
- Country: Iran
- Province: Kermanshah
- County: Kangavar
- Bakhsh: Central
- Rural District: Fash

Population (2006)
  - Total: 195
- Time zone: UTC+3:30 (IRST)
  - Summer (DST): UTC+4:30 (IRDT)

Gerdakaneh (Persian: گردكانه, also Romanized as Gerdakāneh) is a village in Fash Rural District, in the Central District of Kangavar County, Kermanshah Province, Iran. At the 2006 census, its population was 195, in 39 families.
