= Khanjar Khan =

Khanjar Khan خنجرخان
- Village
- Location within Iran
- Coordinates: 38°30′58″N 45°00′25″E
- Country: Iran
- Province: West Azerbaijan
- County: Khoy
- Bakhsh: Central
- Rural District: Qarah Su

Population (2006)
  - Total: 307
- Time zone: UTC+3:30 (IRST)
  - Summer (DST): UTC+4:30 (IRDT)

Khanjar Khan (Persian: خنجرخان, also Romanized as Khanjar Khān; also known as Khandzhalkhan and Khānjal Khān) is a village in Qarah Su Rural District, in the Central District of Khoy County, West Azerbaijan Province, Iran. At the 2006 census, its population was 307, in 68 families.
