= Gerdakaneh Sanjabi =

Gerdakaneh Sanjabi گردکانه سنجابي
- Village
- Location within Iran
- Coordinates: 34°07′00″N 47°56′09″E
- Country: Iran
- Province: Lorestan
- County: Delfan
- Bakhsh: Central
- Rural District: Nurali

Population (2006)
  - Total: 118
- Time zone: UTC+3:30 (IRST)
  - Summer (DST): UTC+4:30 (IRDT)

Gerdakaneh Sanjabi (Persian: گردکانه سنجابي, also Romanized as Gerdakāneh Sanjābī; also known as Gerdakāneh) is a village in Nurali Rural District, in the Central District of Delfan County, Lorestan Province, Iran. At the 2006 census, its population was 118, in 27 families.
