= Ab Barik, Khuzestan =

Ab Barik اب باريك
- Village
- Location within Iran
- Coordinates: 31°57′40″N 49°21′54″E
- Country: Iran
- Province: Khuzestan
- County: Masjed Soleyman
- Bakhsh: Golgir
- Rural District: Tolbozan

Population (2006)
  - Total: 70
- Time zone: UTC+3:30 (IRST)
  - Summer (DST): UTC+4:30 (IRDT)

Ab Barik (Persian: اب باريك, also Romanized as Āb Bārīk and Āb-e Bārīk; also known as Bārīkābād) is a village in Tolbozan Rural District, Golgir District, Masjed Soleyman County, Khuzestan province, Iran. At the 2006 census, its population was 70, in 14 families.
