= Ab Barik, Divandarreh =

Ab Barik آب باريك
- Village
- Location within Iran
- Coordinates: 36°06′50″N 47°15′00″E
- Country: Iran
- Province: Kurdistan
- County: Divandarreh
- Bakhsh: Central
- Rural District: Qaratureh

Population (2006)
  - Total: 203
- Time zone: UTC+3:30 (IRST)
  - Summer (DST): UTC+4:30 (IRDT)

Ab Barik (Persian: آب باريك, also Romanized as Āb Bārīk) is a village in Qaratureh Rural District, in the Central District of Divandarreh County, Kurdistan province, Iran. At the 2006 census, its population was 203, in 42 families. The village is populated by Kurds.
