= Ab-e Barik-e Qowdi =

- Location in Afghanistan
- Coordinates: 34°54′20″N 62°43′11″E
- Country: Afghanistan
- Province: Badghis Province
- Time zone: + 4.30

Ab-e Barik-e Qowdi is a village in Badghis Province in north-western Afghanistan.
