= Khiaran, Lorestan =

Khiaran خياران
- Village
- Location within Iran
- Coordinates: 33°25′48″N 47°17′30″E
- Country: Iran
- Province: Lorestan
- County: Kuhdasht
- Bakhsh: Kunani
- Rural District: Kunani

Population (2006)
  - Total: 45
- Time zone: UTC+3:30 (IRST)
  - Summer (DST): UTC+4:30 (IRDT)

Khiaran (Persian: خياران, also Romanized as Khīārān; also known as Khīārān-e Khānī and Nūr‘alī-ye Khīārān-e Far‘ī) is a village in Kunani Rural District, Kunani District, Kuhdasht County, Lorestan Province, Iran. At the 2006 census, its population was 45, in 9 families.
