= Āb Bārīk =

Āb Bārīk آب باریک
- Village
- Interactive map of Āb Bārīk
- Coordinates: 34°39′04″N 66°15′16″E
- Country: Afghanistan
- Province: Ghor Province
- District: La Wa Sarjagal District
- Time zone: UTC+4:30 (Afghanistan Standard Time)

Āb Bārīk (Arabic: آب باریک, also called Āo Barik, Avbarik, Aw Bārīk, Awbāṟīk) is a village in Ghor Province, in central Afghanistan.

Āb Bārīk (Afghanistan)

== See also ==
- Ghōr Province
