= Hezar Khani, Kangavar =

Hezar Khani هزارخاني
- Village
- Location within Iran
- Coordinates: 34°35′20″N 47°50′48″E
- Country: Iran
- Province: Kermanshah
- County: Kangavar
- Bakhsh: Central
- Rural District: Fash

Population (2006)
  - Total: 151
- Time zone: UTC+3:30 (IRST)
  - Summer (DST): UTC+4:30 (IRDT)

Hezar Khani (Persian: هزارخاني, also Romanized as Hezār Khānī) is a village in Fash Rural District, in the Central District of Kangavar County, Kermanshah Province, Iran. At the 2006 census, its population was 151, in 35 families.
