= Hezar Khani, Kermanshah =

Hezar Khani هزارخاني
- Village
- Location within Iran
- Coordinates: 33°57′44″N 47°08′27″E
- Country: Iran
- Province: Kermanshah
- County: Kermanshah
- Bakhsh: Firuzabad
- Rural District: Osmanvand

Population (2006)
  - Total: 28
- Time zone: UTC+3:30 (IRST)
  - Summer (DST): UTC+4:30 (IRDT)

Hezar Khani (Persian: هزارخاني, also Romanized as Hezār Khānī and Hezārkhānī) is a village in Osmanvand Rural District, Firuzabad District, Kermanshah County, Kermanshah Province, Iran. At the 2006 census, its population was 28, in 7 families.
