= Barik Ab, Khuzestan =

Barik Ab باریک‌آب
- Village
- Location within Iran
- Coordinates: 32°51′30″N 48°19′50″E
- Country: Iran
- Province: Khuzestan
- County: Andimeshk
- Bakhsh: Alvar-e Garmsiri
- Rural District: Qilab

Population (2006)
  - Total: 77
- Time zone: UTC+3:30 (IRST)
  - Summer (DST): UTC+4:30 (IRDT)

Barik Ab (Persian: باریک‌آب, also Romanized as Bārīk Āb and Bārīkāb) is a village in Qilab Rural District, Alvar-e Garmsiri District, Andimeshk County, Khuzestan Province, Iran. At the 2006 census, its population was 77, in 17 families.
