= Ab Barik, Bijar =

Ab Barik آب باريك
- Village
- Location within Iran
- Coordinates: 36°10′57″N 47°25′06″E
- Country: Iran
- Province: Kurdistan
- County: Bijar
- Bakhsh: Central
- Rural District: Siyah Mansur

Population (2006)
  - Total: 187
- Time zone: UTC+3:30 (IRST)
  - Summer (DST): UTC+4:30 (IRDT)

Ab Barik (Persian: آب باريك, also Romanized as Āb Bārīk) is a village in Siyah Mansur Rural District, in the Central District of Bijar County, Kurdistan Province, Iran. At the 2006 census, its population was 187, in 40 families. The village is populated by Kurds.
