= Jan Ahmad, Isfahan =

Jan Ahmad جان احمد
- Village
- Location within Iran
- Coordinates: 32°38′46″N 50°22′31″E
- Country: Iran
- Province: Isfahan
- County: Chadegan
- Bakhsh: Chenarud
- Rural District: Chenarud-e Shomali

Population (2006)
  - Total: 35
- Time zone: UTC+3:30 (IRST)
  - Summer (DST): UTC+4:30 (IRDT)

Jan Ahmad (Persian: جان احمد, also Romanized as Jān Aḩmad) is a village in Chenarud-e Shomali Rural District, Chenarud District, Chadegan County, Isfahan Province, Iran. At the 2006 census, its population was 35, in 9 families.
