= Sarab, Sahneh =

Sarab سراب
- Village
- Location within Iran
- Coordinates: 34°27′00″N 47°47′02″E
- Country: Iran
- Province: Kermanshah
- County: Sahneh
- Bakhsh: Central
- Rural District: Sahneh

Population (2006)
  - Total: 310
- Time zone: UTC+3:30 (IRST)
  - Summer (DST): UTC+4:30 (IRDT)

Sarab (Persian: سراب, also Romanized as Sarāb; also known as Sarāb Bīd Sorkh and Sarāb Şaḩneh) is a village in Sahneh Rural District, in the Central District of Sahneh County, Kermanshah Province, Iran. At the 2006 census, its population was 310, in 82 families.
