= Tappeh Rash, Ravansar =

Tappeh Rash تپه رش
- Village
- Location within Iran
- Coordinates: 34°36′47″N 46°41′41″E
- Country: Iran
- Province: Kermanshah
- County: Ravansar
- Bakhsh: Central
- Rural District: Hasanabad

Population (2006)
  - Total: 127
- Time zone: UTC+3:30 (IRST)
  - Summer (DST): UTC+4:30 (IRDT)

Tappeh Rash (Persian: تپه رش) is a village in Hasanabad Rural District, in the Central District of Ravansar County, Kermanshah Province, Iran. At the 2006 census, its population was 127, in 31 families.
