= Cheshmeh Kareh, Khorramabad =

Cheshmeh Kareh چشمه كره
- Village
- Location within Iran
- Coordinates: 33°19′31″N 48°43′05″E
- Country: Iran
- Province: Lorestan
- County: Khorramabad
- Bakhsh: Papi
- Rural District: Gerit

Population (2006)
  - Total: 14
- Time zone: UTC+3:30 (IRST)
  - Summer (DST): UTC+4:30 (IRDT)

Cheshmeh Kareh (Persian: چشمه كره) is a village in Gerit Rural District, Papi District, Khorramabad County, Lorestan Province, Iran. At the 2006 census, its population was 14, in 4 families.
