= Ab Barik, Dehgolan =

Ab Barik آب باريك
- Village
- Location within Iran
- Coordinates: 35°17′22″N 47°28′17″E
- Country: Iran
- Province: Kurdistan
- County: Dehgolan
- Bakhsh: Central
- Rural District: Howmeh-ye Dehgolan

Population (2006)
  - Total: 367
- Time zone: UTC+3:30 (IRST)
  - Summer (DST): UTC+4:30 (IRDT)

Ab Barik (Persian: آب باريك, also Romanized as Āb Bārīk, Āb-e Bārīk, and Āb-i-Bārīk; also known as Sefīd Savār) is a village in Howmeh-ye Dehgolan Rural District, in the Central District of Dehgolan County, Kurdistan province, Iran. At the 2006 census, its population was 367, in 80 families. The village is populated by Kurds.
