= Ab Barik, Kangavar =

Ab Barik آب‌باریک
- Village
- Location within Iran
- Coordinates: 34°33′32″N 47°52′53″E
- Country: Iran
- Province: Kermanshah
- County: Kangavar
- Bakhsh: Central
- Rural District: Fash

Population (2006)
  - Total: 160
- Time zone: UTC+3:30 (IRST)
  - Summer (DST): UTC+4:30 (IRDT)

Ab Barik (Persian: آب‌باریک, also Romanized as Āb Bārīk; also known as Āb-i-Barir) is a village in Fash Rural District, in the Central District of Kangavar County, Kermanshah province, Iran. At the 2006 census, its population was 160, in 43 families.
