= Ab Barik-e Shomali =

Ab Barik-e Shomali اب باريك شمالي
- Village
- Location within Iran
- Coordinates: 34°30′07″N 47°36′41″E
- Country: Iran
- Province: Kermanshah
- County: Sahneh
- Bakhsh: Central
- Rural District: Hojr

Population (2006)
  - Total: 387
- Time zone: UTC+3:30 (IRST)
  - Summer (DST): UTC+4:30 (IRDT)

Ab Barik-e Shomali (Persian: اب باريك شمالي, also Romanized as Āb Bārīk-e Shomālī; also known as Āb Bārīk and Āb-e Bārīk) is a village in Hojr Rural District, in the Central District of Sahneh County, Kermanshah Province, Iran. At the 2006 census, its population was 387, in 92 families.
