= Ab Barik-e Kuchek =

Ab Barik-e Kuchek آب باریک کوچک
- Village
- Location within Iran
- Coordinates: 35°41′06″N 52°35′51″E
- Country: Iran
- Province: Tehran
- County: Firuzkuh
- Bakhsh: Central
- Rural District: Hablerud

Population (2016)
  - Total: 40
- Time zone: UTC+3:30 (IRST)

Ab Barik-e Kuchek (Persian: آب باریک کوچک, also Romanized as Āb Bārīk-e Kūcheḵ; also known as Āb Bārīk) is a village in Hablerud Rural District, in the Central District of Firuzkuh County, Tehran province, Iran.

At the time of the 2006 National Census, the village's population was 15 in 6 households. The following census in 2011 counted 78 people in 29 households. The 2016 census measured the population of the village as 40 people in 19 households.
