= Ab Barik, Kerman =

Ab Barik آب‌باریک
- village
- Location within Iran
- Coordinates: 27°44′08″N 57°41′53″E
- Country: Iran
- Province: Kerman
- County: Kahnuj
- Bakhsh: Central
- Rural District: Deh Kahan

Population (2006)
  - Total: 238
- Time zone: UTC+3:30 (IRST)
  - Summer (DST): UTC+4:30 (IRDT)

Ab Barik (Persian: آب‌باریک, also Romanized as Āb Bārīk; also known as Jū Bārīk) is a village in Deh Kahan Rural District, Central District, Kahnuj County, Kerman province, Iran. At the 2006 census, its population was 238, in 57 families.
