= Sar Darreh-ye Bibi Roshteh =

Sar Darreh-ye Bibi Roshteh سردره بي بي رشته
- Village
- Location within Iran
- Coordinates: 30°44′52″N 50°42′29″E
- Country: Iran
- Province: Kohgiluyeh and Boyer-Ahmad
- County: Charam
- Bakhsh: Central
- Rural District: Alqchin

Population (2006)
  - Total: 76
- Time zone: UTC+3:30 (IRST)
  - Summer (DST): UTC+4:30 (IRDT)

Sar Darreh-ye Bibi Roshteh (Persian: سردره بي بي رشته, also Romanized as Sar Darreh-ye Bībī Roshteh; also known as Sar Darreh) is a village in Alqchin Rural District, in the Central District of Charam County, Kohgiluyeh and Boyer-Ahmad Province, Iran. At the 2006 census, its population was 76, in 14 families.
