= Khanjar Qeshlaqi =

Khanjar Qeshlaqi خنجرقشلاقي
- Village
- Location within Iran
- Coordinates: 37°28′37″N 45°12′58″E
- Country: Iran
- Province: West Azerbaijan
- County: Urmia
- Bakhsh: Central
- Rural District: Torkaman

Population (2006)
  - Total: 184
- Time zone: UTC+3:30 (IRST)
  - Summer (DST): UTC+4:30 (IRDT)

Khanjar Qeshlaqi (Persian: خنجرقشلاقي, also Romanized as Khanjar Qeshlāqī; also known as Qeshlāq-e Khanjar) is a village in Torkaman Rural District, in the Central District of Urmia County, West Azerbaijan Province, Iran. At the 2006 census, its population was 184, in 48 families.
