= Sardarah, Hormozgan =

Sardarah سردره
- Village
- Location within Iran
- Coordinates: 27°27′38″N 56°38′39″E
- Country: Iran
- Province: Hormozgan
- County: Bandar Abbas
- Bakhsh: Takht
- Rural District: Takht

Population (2006)
  - Total: 164
- Time zone: UTC+3:30 (IRST)
  - Summer (DST): UTC+4:30 (IRDT)

Sardarah (Persian: سردره, also Romanized as Sar Darreh), is a village in Takht Rural District, Takht District, Bandar Abbas County, Hormozgan Province, Iran. At the 2006 census, its population was 164, in 56 families.
