= Paizabad, West Azerbaijan =

Paizabad پاييزاباد
- Village
- Location within Iran
- Coordinates: 39°02′33″N 44°21′55″E
- Country: Iran
- Province: West Azerbaijan
- County: Chaldoran
- Bakhsh: Central
- Rural District: Chaldoran-e Jonubi

Population (2006)
  - Total: 12
- Time zone: UTC+3:30 (IRST)
  - Summer (DST): UTC+4:30 (IRDT)

Paizabad (Persian: پاييزاباد, also Romanized as Pā'īzābād) is a village in Chaldoran-e Jonubi Rural District, in the Central District of Chaldoran County, West Azerbaijan Province, Iran. At the 2006 census, its population was 12, in 4 families.
