= Ab Barik-e Sofla, Razavi Khorasan =

Ab Barik-e Sofla آب باریک سفلی
- Village
- Location within Iran
- Coordinates: 35°44′48″N 59°13′49″E
- Country: Iran
- Province: Razavi Khorasan
- County: Torbat-e Heydarieh
- Bakhsh: Jolgeh Rokh
- Rural District: Bala Rokh

Population (2006)
  - Total: 126
- Time zone: UTC+3:30 (IRST)
  - Summer (DST): UTC+4:30 (IRDT)

Ab Barik-e Sofla (Persian: آب باریک سفلی, also Romanized as Āb Bārīk-e Soflá and Āb Bārīk Soflá; also known as Āb Bārīk-e Pā’īn and Dar Sarv-i-Bārik) is a village in Bala Rokh Rural District, Jolgeh Rokh District, Torbat-e Heydarieh County, Razavi Khorasan Province, Iran. At the 2006 census, its population was 126, in 33 families.

== See also ==
- List of cities, towns and villages in Razavi Khorasan Province
