= Deh Asiab, Sahneh =

Deh Asiab ده اسياب
- Village
- Location within Iran
- Coordinates: 34°37′44″N 47°32′29″E
- Country: Iran
- Province: Kermanshah
- County: Sahneh
- Bakhsh: Dinavar
- Rural District: Dinavar

Population (2006)
  - Total: 107
- Time zone: UTC+3:30 (IRST)
  - Summer (DST): UTC+4:30 (IRDT)

Deh Asiab (Persian: ده اسياب, also Romanized as Deh Āsīāb; also known as Deh Āsīāb-e Dīnvar) is a village in Dinavar Rural District, Dinavar District, Sahneh County, Kermanshah Province, Iran. At the 2006 census, its population was 107, in 29 families.
