= Sonqor =

City in Kermanshah province, Iran

Sonqor Persian: سنقر
- City
- Location within Iran
- Coordinates: 34°46′58″N 47°35′54″E
- Country: Iran
- Province: Kermanshah
- County: Sonqor
- District: Central

Population (2016)
  - Total: 44,256
- Time zone: UTC+3:30 (IRST)

Sonqor (Persian: سنقر) (Note: Also known as Sanghūr and Sūnqūr; Kurdish: سونقوڕ) is a city in the Central District of Sonqor County, Kermanshah province, Iran, serving as capital of both the county and the district. It is in the Zagros Mountains, about 90 kilometers from the province's capital city Kermanshah, and consists of two valleys; that of Gavehrud and Shajarud. Sonqor lies between the modern cities of Kangavar and Sanandaj.

== Etymology ==
The name Sonqor may derive from the Turkic chief Sonqor, a vassal of the Mongols of Shiraz, Fars, who had arrived in the region with his men during the Mongol occupation of Iran.

== Geography and history ==
In medieval Iran, Sonqor was situated on the road that ran between Dinavar and Adharbaydjan. The orientalist Vladimir Minorsky (died 1966) argued that Sonqor must have therefore corresponded approximately to the first marḥala on the stretch from Dinavar to Sisar, the name of which is recorded as al-Djarba by Al-Maqdisi (died 991) and as Kharbadjan by Ibn Khordadbeh (fl. 9th century), and was 7 farsakhs from Dinavar. The present-day distance between the ruins of Dinavar and Sonqor however, is not more than 24 kilometers. Based on these arguments, Sonqor might have therefore corresponded to the medieval district of Maybahradj as noted by Al-Baladhuri (died 892), which was separated from Dinavar under Abbasid Caliph Al-Mahdi (r. 775–785) and joined to Sisar.

Sonqor is separated from Dinavar through the pass of Mele-mas on the "line of heights" that stretches from Dalakham to Amrula. To its northeast, the city of Sonqor is bordered by mount Pandjeh Ali; behind this mountain runs the road from Hamadan to Sanandaj. The upper tributaries of the river that runs to Dinavar also flows into Sonqor, and which ultimately joins the Gamasab river. The second edition of the Encyclopaedia of Islam notes that Sonqor, in the "strict sense", is neighboured by the (more northern) district of Kulya'i "on the upper course" of the Gawarud. The western dependencies of the Gawarud in turn are Bilawar and Niyabat. Sonqor was important in history for being located on the road followed by Muslim pilgrims who moved from Tabriz to Kermanshah. This route avoided the predominantly Kurdish territory of Sanandaj and followed a detour through Bijar (Garrus) and Sonqor, eventually reaching Kermanshah within a day's march.

== Climate ==
Sonqor has a Mediterranean climate (Csa), according to the Köppen climate classification.

Climate data for Sonqor (normals and extremes for Mar 1993–Mar 2022)
Month	Jan	Feb	Mar	Apr	May	Jun	Jul	Aug	Sep	Oct	Nov	Dec	Year
Record high °C (°F)	17.2 (63.0)	19.2 (66.6)	25.4 (77.7)	27.8 (82.0)	33.1 (91.6)	40.9 (105.6)	41.0 (105.8)	40.0 (104.0)	38.3 (100.9)	33.0 (91.4)	28.2 (82.8)	20.4 (68.7)	41.0 (105.8)
Mean daily maximum °C (°F)	7.0 (44.6)	7.0 (44.6)	12.3 (54.1)	16.6 (61.9)	22.3 (72.1)	30.0 (86.0)	35.2 (95.4)	35.5 (95.9)	32.6 (90.7)	25.8 (78.4)	16.1 (61.0)	9.8 (49.6)	20.9 (69.5)
Daily mean °C (°F)	1.3 (34.3)	1.3 (34.3)	5.8 (42.4)	9.8 (49.6)	14.6 (58.3)	20.2 (68.4)	25.4 (77.7)	25.9 (78.6)	22.3 (72.1)	16.7 (62.1)	9.5 (49.1)	3.9 (39.0)	13.1 (55.5)
Mean daily minimum °C (°F)	−4.7 (23.5)	−4.6 (23.7)	−0.6 (30.9)	2.8 (37.0)	6.5 (43.7)	9.5 (49.1)	14.2 (57.6)	15.2 (59.4)	11.0 (51.8)	6.9 (44.4)	2.8 (37.0)	−1.9 (28.6)	4.8 (40.6)
Record low °C (°F)	−24.6 (−12.3)	−22.6 (−8.7)	−16.0 (3.2)	−8.0 (17.6)	−3.2 (26.2)	1.8 (35.2)	4.0 (39.2)	5.0 (41.0)	3.8 (38.8)	−2.8 (27.0)	−11.2 (11.8)	−25.0 (−13.0)	−25.0 (−13.0)
Average precipitation mm (inches)	42.4 (1.67)	53.8 (2.12)	53.7 (2.11)	75.2 (2.96)	43.5 (1.71)	4.0 (0.16)	0.7 (0.03)	0.8 (0.03)	1.3 (0.05)	9.2 (0.36)	69.8 (2.75)	54.3 (2.14)	408.7 (16.09)
Average precipitation days	8	10	8.8	11.2	9.4	1.9	0.7	0.4	0.8	2.2	8.8	8.9	71.1
Average relative humidity (%)	66.3	68.3	60.2	57.3	53.3	39.9	28.6	27.4	28.8	35.5	58.6	66.7	49.2
Mean monthly sunshine hours	155.4	157.7	190.3	239.3	273.1	354.0	363.9	353.2	340.0	273.7	190.4	158.7	3,049.7
Source: Kermanshah Meteorological Office (precipitation 1992–2021, rainy days 2000–2021, daily minimum 1994–2021, sun 2000–2016)

== Sights ==
The Ilkhanate era Malek Tomb is located in the city.

== Demographics ==
Sonqor County, in which the city of Sonqor is located, is made up of two distinct population elements. The city of Sonqor is predominantly inhabited by Sonqori Turks, whose ancestors reportedly arrived during the Mongol domination of Iran, and significant Kurds. The Turkic people of Sonqor originally speak the Sonqori dialect. The area of Sonqor County outside of Sonqor city, on the other hand mostly populated by Kurds most of whom have originally been agriculturalists. The inhabitants of Sonqor city are generally trilingual in Sonqori, Kurdish and Persian. Many Kurds from the surrounding countryside later settled in the city of Sonqor. During the Iran–Iraq War, the city of Sonqor received a wave of Feyli Kurdish refugees from Iraq, which had a considerable effect on the demographics, as well as refugees from Halabja.

=== Population ===
At the time of the 2006 National Census, the city's population was 43,184 in 11,377 households. The following census in 2011 counted 44,954 people in 13,228 households. The 2016 census measured the population of the city as 44,256 people in 13,996 households.

== Sources ==
- Borjian, Habib (2017). "KERMANSHAH vii. LANGUAGES AND DIALECTS". In Yarshater, Ehsan (ed.). Encyclopædia Iranica. Vol. XVI/3: Kégl–Kešaʾi Dialect. London and New York: Routledge & Kegan Paul. pp. 324–329. ISBN 978-1-934283-50-9.
- Knüppel, Michael (2010) [2000]. "TURKIC LANGUAGES OF PERSIA: AN OVERVIEW". Encyclopædia Iranica.
- Minorsky, V. (1997). "Sunḳur". In Bosworth, C. E.; van Donzel, E.; Heinrichs, W. P. & Lecomte, G. (eds.). The Encyclopaedia of Islam, Second Edition. Volume IX: San–Sze. Leiden: E. J. Brill. ISBN 978-90-04-10422-8.
- Website of CHHTO of Kermanshah
