= Ab Barik-e Olya, Razavi Khorasan =

Ab Barik-e Olya آب باریک علیا
- Village
- Location within Iran
- Coordinates: 35°43′35″N 59°17′09″E
- Country: Iran
- Province: Razavi Khorasan
- County: Torbat-e Heydarieh
- Bakhsh: Jolgeh Rokh
- Rural District: Bala Rokh

Population (2006)
  - Total: 60
- Time zone: UTC+3:30 (IRST)
  - Summer (DST): UTC+4:30 (IRDT)

Ab Barik-e Olya (Persian: آب باریک علیا, also Romanized as Āb Barīk-e 'Olyā and Āb Barīk 'Olyā; also known as Āb Bārīk, Āb Bārīk-e Bālā, Obalik, and Obalik Bāla ) is a village in Bala Rokh Rural District, Jolgeh Rokh District, Torbat-e Heydarieh County, Razavi Khorasan province, Iran. At the 2006 census, its population was 60, in 19 families.

== See also ==
- List of cities, towns and villages in Razavi Khorasan province
