= Bavaleh District =

District in Kermanshah province, Iran

Bavaleh District Persian: بخش باوله
- District
- Location within Iran
- Coordinates: 34°56′11″N 47°40′24″E
- Country: Iran
- Province: Kermanshah
- County: Sonqor
- Capital: Bavaleh
- Time zone: UTC+3:30 (IRST)

Bavaleh District (Persian: بخش باوله) is in Sonqor County, Kermanshah province, Iran. Its capital is the village of Bavaleh, whose population at the time of the 2016 National Census was 1,080 people in 281 households.

== History ==
In 2021, Bavaleh and Gavrud Rural Districts were separated from the Central District in the formation of Bavaleh District.

== Demographics ==
=== Administrative divisions ===
Bavaleh District
Administrative Divisions
Bavaleh RD
Gavrud RD
RD = Rural District
