= Sonqori dialect =

Transitional Turkic dialect of Iran

Sonqori
- سؤنقؤر دیلی, Sönqör dili
- Native to: Iran
- Region: Sonqor County
- Native speakers: (undated figure of c. 40,000)
- Language family: Turkic: Common Turkic; Oghuz; Southern Oghuz; Sonqori

Language codes
- ISO 639-3: (included in South Azerbaijani azb)
- Glottolog: sonq1234

Sonqori, also known as Sonqori Turkic, is a Turkic dialect spoken in Sonqor (Sunqur), east of Kermānšāh, in a large valley separated from the rest of Kurdistan.

According to the Turkologist Michael Knüppel, Sonqori is one of the Southern Oghuz dialects of Iran alongside Qashqai and Äynallu. He notes that K. H. Menges had already characterized Sonqori, together with Qashqai and Äynallu, as a transitional form between Azerbaijani and Khorasani Turkic.

Turkologist Gerhard Doerfer identifies Sonqori as a possible dialect of Azerbaijani, or as a distinctive variety of Southern Oghuz/Afshar. Ethnologue and Glottolog list it as an South Azerbaijani dialect.

Knowledge of the dialect was scant prior to the expeditions of the University of Göttingen.

About 40,000 speakers of Sonqori exist in the Sonqor area.

== Phonology ==
Consonant phonemes
	Labial		Alveolar		Palatal		Velar		Uvular	Glottal
Plosive	p~pʰ	b~p	t~tʰ	d~t			k~kʰ	ɡ~k	q~ɢ	
Affricate					t͡ʃ/t͡ʃʰ	d͡ʒ/t͡ʃ				
Fricative	f	v~w	s	z	ʃ	ʒ	x	ɣ		h
Nasal	m		n		ɲ		ŋ			
Flap			r~ɾ							
Lateral			l							
Approximant					j					

=== Vowels ===
Vowels
	Front		Back	
	unrounded	rounded	unrounded	rounded
Close	i	y	ɯ	u
Mid	e	ø		o
Open	æ		ɑ	ɒ

== Literature ==
- Knüppel, Michael (2000). "TURKIC LANGUAGES OF PERSIA: AN OVERVIEW". In Yarshater, Ehsan (ed.). Encyclopædia Iranica (Online ed.). Encyclopædia Iranica Foundation.
- Doerfer, Gerhard (1988). "AZERBAIJAN viii. Azeri Turkish". In Yarshater, Ehsan (ed.). Encyclopædia Iranica (Online ed.). Encyclopædia Iranica Foundation.
- Doerfer, Gerhard; Hesche, Wolfram (1989). Südoghusische Materialen aus Afghanistan und Iran. Wiesbaden: Otto Harrassowitz. ISBN 9783447027861.
- Borjian, Habib (2017). "KERMANSHAH vii. LANGUAGES AND DIALECTS". In Yarshater, Ehsan (ed.). Encyclopædia Iranica (Online ed.). Encyclopædia Iranica Foundation.
