= Parsinah Rural District =

Rural district in Kermanshah province, Iran

Parsinah Rural District Persian: دهستان پارسينه
- Rural District
- Location within Iran
- Coordinates: 34°41′13″N 47°44′18″E
- Country: Iran
- Province: Kermanshah
- County: Sonqor
- District: Central
- Capital: Farsinaj-e Jadid

Population (2016)
  - Total: 4,364
- Time zone: UTC+3:30 (IRST)

Parsinah Rural District (Persian: دهستان پارسينه) is in the Central District of Sonqor County, Kermanshah province, Iran. Its capital is the village of Farsinaj-e Jadid.

== Demographics ==
=== Population ===
At the time of the 2006 National Census, the rural district's population was 5,899 in 1,390 households. There were 5,478 inhabitants in 1,545 households at the following census of 2011. The 2016 census measured the population of the rural district as 4,364 in 1,422 households. The most populous of its 19 villages was Farsinaj-e Jadid, with 2,287 people.
