= Sarab Rural District (Sonqor County) =

Rural district in Kermanshah province, Iran

Sarab Rural District Persian: دهستان سراب
- Rural District
- Location within Iran
- Coordinates: 34°44′16″N 47°32′45″E
- Country: Iran
- Province: Kermanshah
- County: Sonqor
- District: Central
- Capital: Gaznahleh

Population (2016)
  - Total: 4,452
- Time zone: UTC+3:30 (IRST)

Sarab Rural District (Persian: دهستان سراب) is in the Central District of Sonqor County, Kermanshah province, Iran. Its capital is the village of Gaznahleh.

== Demographics ==
=== Population ===
At the time of the 2006 National Census, the rural district's population was 5,926 in 1,428 households. There were 5,457 inhabitants in 1,523 households at the following census of 2011. The 2016 census measured the population of the rural district as 4,452 in 1,377 households. The most populous of its 26 villages was Aqbolagh, with 623 people.
