= Ab Barik Rural District =

Rural district in Kermanshah province, Iran

Ab Barik Rural District Persian: دهستان آب باریک
- Rural District
- Location within Iran
- Coordinates: 34°48′08″N 47°43′59″E
- Country: Iran
- Province: Kermanshah
- County: Sonqor
- District: Central
- Capital: Ab Barik-e Olya

Population (2016)
  - Total: 4,328
- Time zone: UTC+3:30 (IRST)

Ab Barik Rural District (Persian: دهستان آب باریک) is in the Central District of Sonqor County, Kermanshah province, Iran. Its capital is the village of Ab Barik-e Olya.

== Demographics ==
=== Population ===
At the time of the 2006 National Census, the rural district's population was 6,419 in 1,561 households. There were 5,605 inhabitants in 1,528 households at the following census of 2011. The 2016 census measured the population of the rural district as 4,328 in 1,362 households. The most populous of its 21 villages was Sahanleh, with 1,224 people.
