= Gavrud Rural District (Sonqor County) =

Rural district in Kermanshah province, Iran

Gavrud Rural District Persian: دهستان گاورود
- Rural District
- Location within Iran
- Coordinates: 34°56′09″N 47°32′49″E
- Country: Iran
- Province: Kermanshah
- County: Sonqor
- District: Bavaleh
- Capital: Deh-e Rezvan

Population (2016)
  - Total: 5,770
- Time zone: UTC+3:30 (IRST)

Gavrud Rural District (Persian: دهستان گاورود) is in Bavaleh District of Sonqor County, Kermanshah province, Iran. Its capital is the village of Deh-e Rezvan. The previous capital of the rural district was the village of Qomam.

== Demographics ==
=== Population ===
At the time of the 2006 National Census, the rural district's population (as a part of the Central District) was 9,512 in 2,149 households. There were 7,719 inhabitants in 2,210 households at the following census of 2011. The 2016 census measured the population of the rural district as 5,770 in 1,881 households. The most populous of its 39 villages was Gerdakaneh-ye Olya, with 752 people.

In 2021, the rural district was separated from the district in the formation of Bavaleh District.
