= Bavaleh Rural District =

Rural district in Kermanshah province, Iran

Bavaleh Rural District Persian: دهستان باوله
- Rural District
- Location within Iran
- Coordinates: 34°57′29″N 47°46′31″E
- Country: Iran
- Province: Kermanshah
- County: Sonqor
- District: Bavaleh
- Capital: Bavaleh

Population (2016)
  - Total: 7,114
- Time zone: UTC+3:30 (IRST)

Bavaleh Rural District (Persian: دهستان باوله) is in Bavaleh District of Sonqor County, Kermanshah province, Iran. Its capital is the village of Bavaleh.

== Demographics ==
=== Population ===
At the time of the 2006 National Census, the rural district's population (as a part of the Central District) was 9,364 in 2,022 households. There were 9,069 inhabitants in 2,309 households at the following census of 2011. The 2016 census measured the population of the rural district as 7,114 in 2,071 households. The most populous of its 38 villages was Bavaleh, with 1,080 people.

In 2021, the rural district was separated from the district in the formation of Bavaleh District.
