= Sonqor County =

County in Kermanshah province, Iran

Sonqor County Persian: شهرستان سنقر
- County
- Location of Sonqor County in Kermanshah province (right, yellow)

- Location of Kermanshah province in Iran
- Coordinates: 34°52′N 47°30′E
- Country: Iran
- Province: Kermanshah
- Capital: Sonqor
- Districts: Central, Bavaleh, Kolyai

Population (2016)
  - Total: 81,661
- Time zone: UTC+3:30 (IRST)
- Website: Website of CHHTO of Kermanshah

Sonqor County (Persian: شهرستان سنقر) is in Kermanshah province, Iran. Its capital is the city of Sonqor.

== History ==
In 2021, Bavaleh and Gavrud Rural Districts were separated from the Central District in the formation of Bavaleh District.

== Demographics ==
=== Language and ethnicity ===
The majority of the people in this county are Kurds and Turks. Sonqor county is made up of two distinct population elements. The city of Sonqor and the villages of Qalʿa-ye Farhād Khan and Qorva are predominantly populated by Turks, whose ancestors reportedly arrived during the Mongol domination of Iran. The Turkic people of Sonqor originally speak the Sonqori dialect. The dialects of Sonqori spoken in Qalʿa-ye Farhād Khan and Qorva differ barely from this main dialect.

The other areas within Sonqor County are predominantly populated by Kurds most of whom have originally been agriculturalists. Many Kolya'i Kurds moved to the city of Sonqor where they detribalized due to the urban environment. More Kurds came to the city of Sonqor during the Iran–Iraq War and had an effect on the demographics. The chiefs of the Kurds of Sonqor County belonged to the Kulya'i tribe. These Kurdish feudal lords (khans) were in control of the Kurdish-populated parts of the county until early 20th century Qajar Iran, and were reportedly scions (in the eighth generation) of a certain Safi Khan who lived in the later Safavid period. In 1786, the district was ceded to Ardalan as a gift from Agha Mohammad Khan Qajar. In 1798, Ali Hemmat Khan and his brother Baba Khan of the Nanakali tribe were executed by Iranian ruler Fath-Ali Shah Qajar (r. 1797-1834) as they had supported Soleyman Khan, the pretender to the Iranian throne. The Kulya'i Kurds of the Sonqor District speak a Kurdish dialect that resembles the dialect of Kermanshah, and, according to the second edition of the Encyclopaedia of Islam are thought to be affiliated to the Ahl-e Haqq syncretic religion. At least 177 villages in the county speak the Kulya'i dialect, 112 of these are in the Kolyai District.

=== Population ===
At the time of the 2006 National Census, the county's population was 95,904 in 23,755 households. The following census in 2011 counted 91,935 people in 26,201 households. The 2016 census measured the population of the county as 81,661 in 25,554 households.

=== Administrative divisions ===
Sonqor County's population history and administrative structure over three consecutive censuses are shown in the following table.

Sonqor County Population
Administrative Divisions	2006	2011	2016
Central District	80,304	78,282	70,284
Ab Barik RD	6,419	5,605	4,328
Bavaleh RD	9,364	9,069	7,114
Gavrud RD	9,512	7,719	5,770
Parsinah RD	5,899	5,478	4,364
Sarab RD	5,926	5,457	4,452
Sonqor (city)	43,184	44,954	44,256
Bavaleh District (Note: Established after the 2016 census)			
Bavaleh RD			
Gavrud RD			
Kolyai District	15,600	13,653	11,363
Agahan RD	5,061	4,189	3,424
Kivananat RD	4,095	4,056	3,130
Satar RD	5,160	4,181	3,761
Satar (city)	1,284	1,227	1,048
Total	95,904	91,935	81,661
RD = Rural District

== See also ==
Media related to Sonqor County at Wikimedia Commons

== Sources ==
- Fattah, Ismaïl Kamandâr (2000), Les dialectes kurdes méridionaux, Acta Iranica 37
- Knüppel, Michael (2010) [2000]. "TURKIC LANGUAGES OF PERSIA: AN OVERVIEW". Encyclopædia Iranica.
- Minorsky, V. (1997). "Sunḳur". In Bosworth, C. E.; van Donzel, E.; Heinrichs, W. P. & Lecomte, G. (eds.). The Encyclopaedia of Islam, Second Edition. Volume IX: San–Sze. Leiden: E. J. Brill. ISBN 978-90-04-10422-8.
