= Central District (Sonqor County) =

District in Kermanshah province, Iran

Central District (Sonqor County) Persian: بخش مرکزی شهرستان سنقر
- District
- Location within Iran
- Coordinates: 34°45′14″N 47°37′19″E
- Country: Iran
- Province: Kermanshah
- County: Sonqor
- Capital: Sonqor

Population (2016)
  - Total: 70,284
- Time zone: UTC+3:30 (IRST)

The Central District of Sonqor County (Persian: بخش مرکزی شهرستان سنقر) is in Kermanshah province, Iran. Its capital is the city of Sonqor.

== History ==
In 2021, Bavaleh and Gavrud Rural Districts were separated from the district in the formation of Bavaleh District.

== Demographics ==
=== Population ===
At the time of the 2006 National Census, the district's population was 80,304 in 19,927 households. The following census in 2011 counted 78,282 people in 22,343 households. The 2016 census measured the population of the district as 70,284 inhabitants in 22,109 households.

=== Administrative divisions ===
Central District (Sonqor County) Population
Administrative Divisions	2006	2011	2016
Ab Barik RD	6,419	5,605	4,328
Bavaleh RD (Note: Transferred to Bavaleh District after the 2016 census)	9,364	9,069	7,114
Gavrud RD	9,512	7,719	5,770
Parsinah RD	5,899	5,478	4,364
Sarab RD	5,926	5,457	4,452
Sonqor (city)	43,184	44,954	44,256
Total	80,304	78,282	70,284
RD = Rural District
