= Firuzabad =

Firuzabad may refer to:

== Castle ==
- Firuzabad Castle, a castle in Sarbaz County, Sistan and Baluchestan Province, Iran

== Azerbaijan ==
- Firuzabad, Azerbaijan, a village in Azerbaijan

== India ==
- Firozabad, a city in Uttar Pradesh, India
- Pandua, Malda, also known as Firuzabad, a ruined city in the Malda district of West Bengal, India; capital of the Sultanate of Bengal

== Iran ==
=== Alborz Province ===
- Firuzabad, Alborz, a village in Nazarabad County, Alborz Province, Iran

=== Ardabil Province ===
- Firuzabad, Ardabil, a village in Ardabil County
- Firuzabad, Kowsar, a village in Kowsar County
- Firuzabad, Parsabad, a village in Parsabad County

=== Chaharmahal and Bakhtiari Province ===
- Firuzabad, Chaharmahal and Bakhtiari, a village in Kiar County

=== Fars Province ===
- Firuzabad, Fars, a city in Fars Province, Iran
- Firuzabad County, an administrative subdivision of Fars Province, Iran

=== Hamadan Province ===
- Firuzabad, Asadabad, a village in Asadabad County
- Firuzabad, Hamadan, a village in Hamadan County
- Firuzabad, Malayer, a village in Malayer County
- Firuzabad-e Sofla, a village in Nahavand County
- Firuzabad-e Tayemeh, a village in Nahavand County

=== Isfahan Province ===
- Firuzabad, Isfahan, a village in Isfahan County

=== Kerman Province ===
- Firuzabad, Fahraj, a village in Fahraj County
- Firuzabad, Kerman, a village in Kerman County
- Firuzabad, Rudbar-e Jonubi, a village in Rudbar-e Jonubi County
- Firuzabad, Pariz, a village in Sirjan County
- Firuzabad, Zarand, a village in Zarand County

=== Kermanshah Province ===
- Firuzabad, Eslamabad-e Gharb, a village in Eslamabad-e Gharb County
- Firuzabad District (Kermanshah Province), an administrative subdivision of Kermanshah Province, Iran
- Firuzabad-e Kuchak, a village in Kangavar County
- Firuzabad-e Tappeh, a village in Kangavar County
- Firuzabad-e Pacheqa, a village in Kermanshah County
- Firuzabad, Sonqor, a village in Sonqor County

=== Khuzestan Province ===
- Firuzabad, Dasht-e Azadegan, a village in Dasht-e Azadegan County
- Firuzabad, Dezful, a village in Dezful County
- Firuzabad, Hendijan, a village in Hendijan County

=== Kurdistan Province ===
- Firuzabad, Kurdistan, a village in Qorveh County

=== Lorestan Province ===
- Firuzabad, Lorestan, a city in Lorestan province, Iran
- Firuzabad, Zaz va Mahru, a village in Zaz va Mahru District, Aligudarz County
- Firuzabad District (Selseleh County), an administrative subdivision of Lorestan province, Iran
- Firuzabad Rural District, an administrative division of Lorestan province, Iran

=== Mazandaran Province ===
- Firuzabad, Bandpey-ye Gharbi, a village in Babol County
- Firuzabad, Bandpey-ye Sharqi, a village in Babol County
- Firuzabad, Nowshahr, a village in Nowshahr County

=== North Khorasan Province ===
- Firuzabad, North Khorasan, a village in North Khorasan Province, Iran

=== Razavi Khorasan Province ===
- Firuzabad, Bardaskan, a village in Bardaskan County
- Firuzabad, Mashhad, a village in Mashhad County
- Firuzabad, Quchan, a village in Quchan County
- Firuzabad, Zaveh, a village in Zaveh County

=== Semnan Province ===
- Firuzabad, Damghan, a village in Damghan County
- Firuzabad, Amirabad, a village in Damghan County
- Firuzabad-e Bala, a village in Shahrud County
- Firuzabad-e Pain, a village in Shahrud County

=== Sistan and Baluchestan Province ===
- Firuzabad, Bampur-e Gharbi, a village in Bampur County
- Firuzabad, Bampur-e Sharqi, a village in Bampur County

=== South Khorasan Province ===
- Firuzabad, Nehbandan, a village in Nehbandan County
- Firuzabad, Qaen, a village in Qaen County
- Firuzabad, Tabas, a village in Tabas County

=== Tehran Province ===
- Firuzabad, Tehran, a village in Rey County

=== West Azerbaijan Province ===
- Firuzabad, West Azerbaijan, a village in Miandoab County
- Firuzabad District (Chaharborj County)

=== Yazd Province ===
- Firuzabad, Abarkuh, a village in Abarkuh County
- Firuzabad, Sabzdasht, a village in Bafq County

== See also ==
- Firozabad (disambiguation)
