= Soleymanabad =

Soleymanabad (Persian: سليمان اباد) may refer to:

- Soleymanabad, Fars
- Soleymanabad, Hamadan
- Soleymanabad, Isfahan
- Soleymanabad, Baraan-e Shomali, Isfahan Province
- Soleymanabad, Kerman
- Soleymanabad, Faryab, Kerman Province
- Soleymanabad, Dalahu, Kermanshah Province
- Soleymanabad, Kangavar, Kermanshah Province
- Soleymanabad, Khuzestan
- Soleymanabad, Mazandaran
- Soleymanabad, North Khorasan
- Soleymanabad, Buin Zahra, Qazvin Province
- Soleymanabad, Qazvin
- Soleymanabad, Tehran (disambiguation), several places
- Soleymanabad, West Azerbaijan
- Soleymanabad, Chaldoran, West Azerbaijan Province
