= Rahmanabad =

Rahmanabad (Persian: رحمان اباد) may refer to various places in Iran:

- Rahmanabad, Hamadan
- Rahmanabad, Kermanshah
- Rahmanabad, Iranshahr, Sistan and Baluchestan Province
- Rahmanabad, Khash, Sistan and Baluchestan Province
- Rahmanabad, Irandegan, Khash County, Sistan and Baluchestan
- Rahmanabad, Qasr-e Qand, Sistan and Baluchestan Province
- Rahmanabad, Sarbaz, Sistan and Baluchestan Province
- Rahmanabad, West Azerbaijan
- Rehmanabad, Punjab province
