= Kandkilah =

Kandkilah كندكيله
- Village
- Location within Iran
- Coordinates: 34°28′43″N 47°54′41″E
- Country: Iran
- Province: Kermanshah
- County: Kangavar
- Bakhsh: Central
- Rural District: Kermajan

Population (2006)
  - Total: 107
- Time zone: UTC+3:30 (IRST)
  - Summer (DST): UTC+4:30 (IRDT)

Kandkilah (Persian: كندكيله, also Romanized as Kandkīlah; also known as Kandīkīlah) is a village in Kermajan Rural District, in the Central District of Kangavar County, Kermanshah Province, Iran. At the 2006 census, its population was 107, in 32 families.
