= Hamyanak =

Hamyanak هميانك
- Village
- Location within Iran
- Coordinates: 34°33′13″N 47°53′56″E
- Country: Iran
- Province: Kermanshah
- County: Kangavar
- Bakhsh: Central
- Rural District: Fash

Population (2006)
  - Total: 93
- Time zone: UTC+3:30 (IRST)
  - Summer (DST): UTC+4:30 (IRDT)

Hamyanak (Persian: هميانك, also Romanized as Hamyānak, Ḩamīānak, and Hamīyānak) is a village in Fash Rural District, in the Central District of Kangavar County, Kermanshah Province, Iran. At the 2006 census, its population was 93, in 21 families.
