= Fashkharan =

Fashkharan فشخواران
- Village
- Location within Iran
- Coordinates: 34°33′09″N 47°56′42″E
- Country: Iran
- Province: Kermanshah
- County: Kangavar
- Bakhsh: Central
- Rural District: Fash

Population (2006)
  - Total: 387
- Time zone: UTC+3:30 (IRST)
  - Summer (DST): UTC+4:30 (IRDT)

Fashkharan (Persian: فشخواران, also Romanized as Fashkhvorān) is a village in Fash Rural District, in the Central District of Kangavar County, Kermanshah Province, Iran. At the 2006 census, its population was 387, with 87 families.
