= Karkhaneh =

Karkhaneh (Persian: كارخانه) may refer to:

- Karkhaneh, Hamadan
- Karkhaneh, Kermanshah
- Karkhaneh, Markazi
- Karkhaneh-ye Hakim
- Karkhaneh Sefid Kan
