= Cheshmeh Nush =

Cheshmeh Nush چشمه نوش
- Village
- Location within Iran
- Coordinates: 34°34′53″N 48°03′33″E
- Country: Iran
- Province: Kermanshah
- County: Kangavar
- Bakhsh: Central
- Rural District: Gowdin

Population (2006)
  - Total: 254
- Time zone: UTC+3:30 (IRST)
  - Summer (DST): UTC+4:30 (IRDT)

Cheshmeh Nush (Persian: چشمه نوش, also Romanized as Cheshmeh Nūsh and Chashmeh Nūsh) is a village in Gowdin Rural District, in the Central District of Kangavar County, Kermanshah Province, Iran. At the 2006 census, its population was 254, in 50 families.
