= Piruzabad =

Piruzabad (Persian: پيروزاباد) may refer to:

- Piruzabad, Golestan
- Piruzabad, Hamadan
- Piruzabad, Kerman
- Piruzabad, Khuzestan
- Piruzabad, Yazd

== See also ==
- Firuzabad (disambiguation)
