= Temple of Anahita, Kangavar =

Temple attributed to Anahita

Temple of Anahita
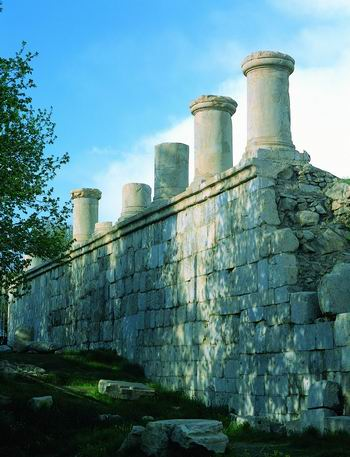

Religion
- Province: Kermanshah Province

Location
- Location: Kangavar County, Iran
- Interactive map of Temple of Anahita

Architecture
- Iran National Heritage List
- Official name: Temple of Anahita
- Type: Ruins
- Designated: 1931
- Reference no.: 31
- Conservation organization: Cultural Heritage, Handicrafts and Tourism Organization of Iran

The Anahita Temple (Persian: پرستشگاه‌ آناهیتا) is the name of one of two archaeological sites in Iran popularly thought to have been attributed to the ancient Iranian deity Anahita. The larger and more widely known of the two is located at Kangāvar in Kermanshah Province. The other is located at Bishapur.

The remains at Kangavar display Persian architectural designs. The plinth's enormous dimensions for example, which measure just over 200m on a side, and its megalithic foundations, which echo Achaemenid stone platforms, "constitute Persian elements". This is thought to be corroborated by the "two lateral stairways that ascend the massive stone platform recalling Achaemenid traditions", particularly that of the Apadana Palace at Persepolis.

Another Iranian construction is the Khurra mausoleum in Markazi Province.

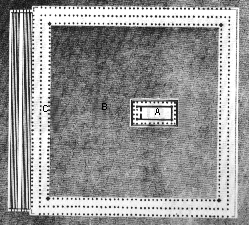
The Anahita temple at Kangavar site plan: Depicted are: A) "temple"; B) courtyard; C) peristyle

== Dispute on identity ==
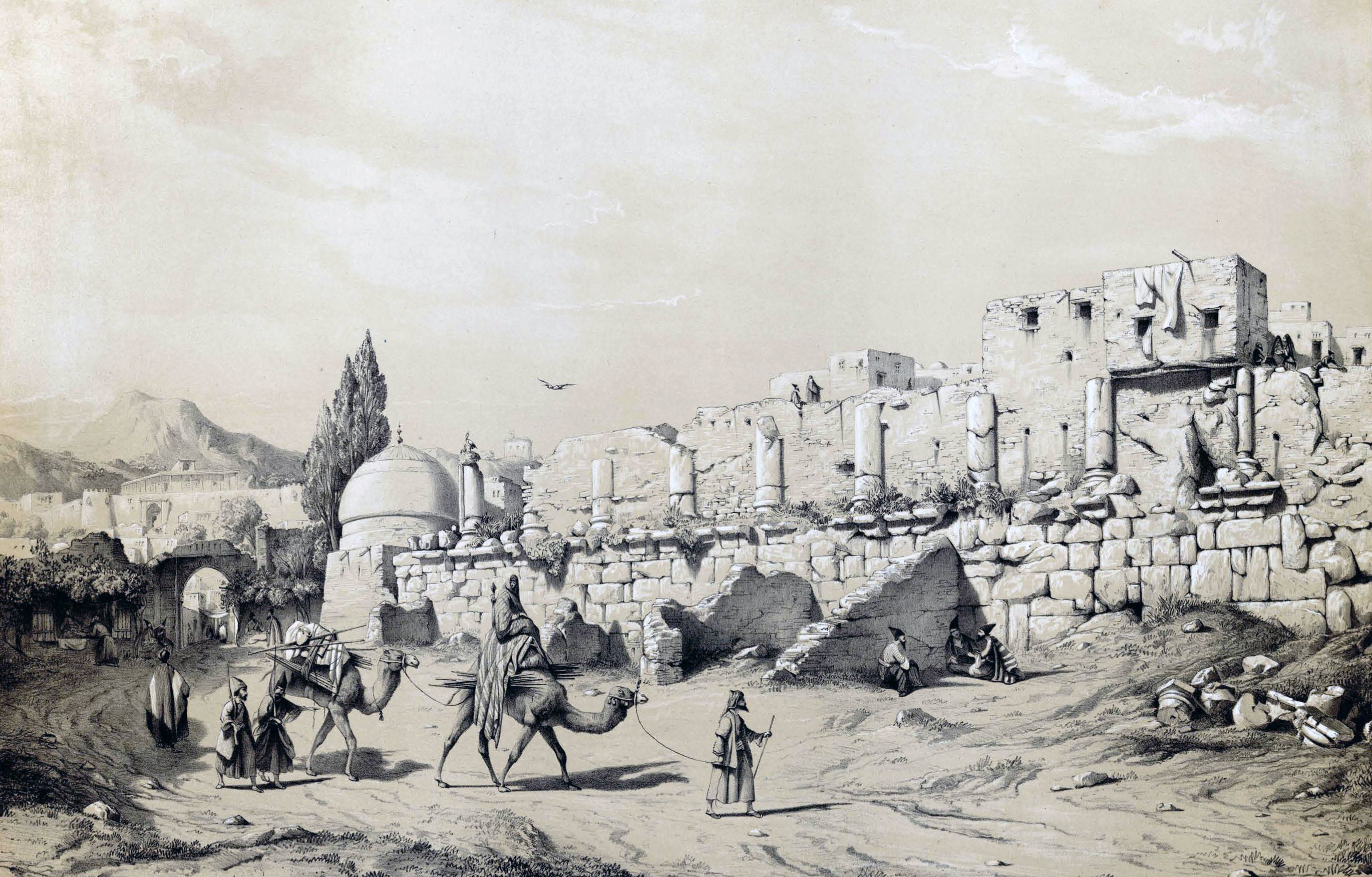
Drawing by Eugène Flandin, 1840s. He mentioned the building as "the Greek temple".

Dispute exists among scholars on the correct identity of the main structure at the site. The Encyclopædia Iranica in this regard concludes:

Until detailed further excavations are carried out, no definite judgments may be declared on the function of Kangava platform.

Excavation first began in 1968, by which time the "large structure with its great Ionic columns set on a high stone platform" had been associated with a comment by Isidore of Charax, that refers to a "temple of Artemis" (Parthian Stations 6). References to Artemis in Iran are generally interpreted to be references to Anahita, and thus Isidore's "temple of Artemis" came to be understood as a reference to a temple of Anahita.

Consequently, it has been commonly believed that the site was a "columnar temple dedicated to Anahit." Karim Pirnia, one of the proponents of this theory, believes that the construction belongs to the Parthian style, which underwent renovations in the Sasanian era. Warwick Ball considers the structure "one of the greatest works of Parthian architecture" which has an "eastern Roman Temple form", with the architectural emphasis being on the temenos. As with Arthur Upham Pope (1965, 1971), Ball (2001) also agrees that the temple architecturally "recalls Achaemenid traditions". These and a number of other scholars continue to examine the site as being possibly attributed to the deity Anahita.

In 1981, a report by an excavator of the site, Massoud Azarnoush however contended that the construction "did not have the necessary characteristics that could identify it as a temple". Ali Akbar Sarfaraz, former head of the archaeology team of the Tehran University, shares this opinion. The popular theory held by this group is that the ruin is of a "late Sasanian palace."

Finally, a third group contends that the site was originally constructed in the Achaemenid era, and underwent several phases of construction. Of this group, one can mention archeologist Seifollah Kambakhshfard.

== Dispute on date of construction ==
Originally, 200 BCE was proposed as the date of the site's construction. "Under the Parthians any observable western influence can just as well be a survival from the Hellenistic period, which is why the monument at Kangāvar was once acceptably dated as early Parthian while recent investigations proved it to be late Sasanian."

In this regard, Warwick Ball however states:

Earlier studies favored a Seleucid date, with some suggesting an Achaemenid date for the platform. A date in the Parthian period has since been more generally favoured on stylistic grounds, but recent excavations found evidence for major Sassanian construction. However the colonnaded temenos is different in almost every respect to Sassanian architecture. Probably, the temple underwent numerous major reconstruction periods, with perhaps a 2nd-century AD date for the colonnaded temenos, and major Sassanian reconstruction of the sanctuary building inside.

== Anahita Temple at Bishapur ==
The Temple of Anahita at Bishapur, "was probably built by Roman prisoners, is well masoned of ashlar blocked walls, and with trapezoid shaped doorways."

== See also ==
- Iranian architecture
- Temple of Anahita, Istakhr
- Firuzabad (Gôr), thought to have an Anahita temple, with Pillar of Gor possibly being a component
- Qadamgah (ancient site), possibly a (post)-Achaemenid religious place related to the Waters
