= Khalaj Rud =

Khalaj Rud خلج رود
- Village
- Location within Iran
- Coordinates: 34°21′37″N 47°53′00″E
- Country: Iran
- Province: Kermanshah
- County: Kangavar
- Bakhsh: Central
- Rural District: Khezel-e Gharbi

Population (2006)
  - Total: 291
- Time zone: UTC+3:30 (IRST)
  - Summer (DST): UTC+4:30 (IRDT)

Khalaj Rud (Persian: خلج رود, also Romanized as Khalaj Rūd; also known as Chāleh Jārū, Halāchārū, and Ḩalachrūd) is a village in Khezel-e Gharbi Rural District, in the Central District of Kangavar County, Kermanshah Province, Iran. At the 2006 census, its population was 291, in 70 families.
