= Tushmalan =

Tushmalan توشمالان
- Village
- Location within Iran
- Coordinates: 34°32′05″N 47°46′07″E
- Country: Iran
- Province: Kermanshah
- County: Kangavar
- Bakhsh: Central
- Rural District: Qazvineh

Population (2006)
  - Total: 234
- Time zone: UTC+3:30 (IRST)
  - Summer (DST): UTC+4:30 (IRDT)

Tushmalan (Persian: توشمالان, also Romanized as Tūshmālān; also known as Tashmalān and Toshmalān) is a village in Qazvineh Rural District, in the Central District of Kangavar County, Kermanshah Province, Iran. At the 2006 census, its population was 234, in 59 families.
