= Shesh Yekan =

Shesh Yekan شش يكان
- Village
- Location within Iran
- Coordinates: 34°31′21″N 47°55′19″E
- Country: Iran
- Province: Kermanshah
- County: Kangavar
- Bakhsh: Central
- Rural District: Fash

Population (2006)
  - Total: 97
- Time zone: UTC+3:30 (IRST)
  - Summer (DST): UTC+4:30 (IRDT)

Shesh Yekan (Persian: شش يكان, also Romanized as Shesh Yekān; also known as Shashīgān) is a village in Fash Rural District, in the Central District of Kangavar County, Kermanshah Province, Iran. At the 2006 census, its population was 97, in 24 families.
