= Qurahjil =

Qurahjil قوره جيل
- Village
- Location within Iran
- Coordinates: 34°28′31″N 47°55′59″E
- Country: Iran
- Province: Kermanshah
- County: Kangavar
- Bakhsh: Central
- Rural District: Kermajan

Population (2006)
  - Total: 157
- Time zone: UTC+3:30 (IRST)
  - Summer (DST): UTC+4:30 (IRDT)

Qurahjil (Persian: قوره جيل, also Romanized as Qūrahjīl) is a village in Kermajan Rural District, in the Central District of Kangavar County, Kermanshah Province, Iran. At the 2006 census, its population was 157, in 43 families.
