= Haft Khaneh, Kermanshah =

Haft Khaneh هفت خانه
- Village
- Location within Iran
- Coordinates: 34°19′51″N 47°55′25″E
- Country: Iran
- Province: Kermanshah
- County: Kangavar
- Bakhsh: Central
- Rural District: Khezel-e Gharbi

Population (2006)
  - Total: 19
- Time zone: UTC+3:30 (IRST)
  - Summer (DST): UTC+4:30 (IRDT)

Haft Khaneh (Persian: هفت خانه, also Romanized as Haft Khāneh; also known as Haft Khānī) is a village in Khezel-e Gharbi Rural District, in the Central District of Kangavar County, Kermanshah Province, Iran. At the 2006 census, its population was 19, in 4 families.
