= Soleymanabad, Kangavar =

Soleymanabad سليمان اباد
- Village
- Location within Iran
- Coordinates: 34°32′51″N 47°57′11″E
- Country: Iran
- Province: Kermanshah
- County: Kangavar
- Bakhsh: Central
- Rural District: Fash

Population (2006)
  - Total: 462
- Time zone: UTC+3:30 (IRST)
  - Summer (DST): UTC+4:30 (IRDT)

Soleymanabad (Persian: سليمان اباد, also Romanized as Soleymānābād) is a village in Fash Rural District, in the Central District of Kangavar County, Kermanshah Province, Iran. At the 2006 census, its population was 462, in 101 families.
