= Qarleq-e Bozorg =

Village in Kermanshah province, Iran

Qarleq-e Bozorg Persian: قارلق بزرگ
- Village
- Location within Iran
- Coordinates: 34°26′24″N 48°03′58″E
- Country: Iran
- Province: Kermanshah
- County: Kangavar
- District: Central
- Rural District: Gowdin

Population (2016)
  - Total: 2,000
- Time zone: UTC+3:30 (IRST)

Qarleq-e Bozorg (Persian: قارلق بزرگ) (Note: Also romanized as Qārleq-e Bozorg; also known as Qālnk, Qālūk, Qārleq, and Qārloq) is a village in Gowdin Rural District of the Central District of Kangavar County, Kermanshah province, Iran.

== Demographics ==
=== Population ===
At the time of the 2006 National Census, the village's population was 1,919 in 443 households. The following census in 2011 counted 2,135 people in 632 households. The 2016 census measured the population of the village as 2,000 people in 602 households. It was the most populous village in its rural district.
