= Qarah Guzlu-ye Olya =

Qarah Guzlu-ye Olya قره گوزلوعليا
- Village
- Location within Iran
- Coordinates: 34°31′10″N 47°52′02″E
- Country: Iran
- Province: Kermanshah
- County: Kangavar
- Bakhsh: Central
- Rural District: Qazvineh

Population (2006)
  - Total: 247
- Time zone: UTC+3:30 (IRST)
  - Summer (DST): UTC+4:30 (IRDT)

Qarah Guzlu-ye Olya (Persian: قره گوزلوعليا, also Romanized as Qarah Gūzlū-ye ‘Olyā; also known as Qarah Gowzlū) is a village in Qazvineh Rural District, in the Central District of Kangavar County, Kermanshah Province, Iran. At the 2006 census, its population was 247, in 65 families.
