= Khar Kosh, Kermanshah =

Khar Kosh خاركش
- Village
- Location within Iran
- Coordinates: 34°31′55″N 47°50′14″E
- Country: Iran
- Province: Kermanshah
- County: Kangavar
- Bakhsh: Central
- Rural District: Qazvineh

Population (2006)
  - Total: 15
- Time zone: UTC+3:30 (IRST)
  - Summer (DST): UTC+4:30 (IRDT)

Khar Kosh (Persian: خاركش, also Romanized as Khār Kosh) is a village in Qazvineh Rural District, in the Central District of Kangavar County, Kermanshah Province, Iran. At the 2006 census, its population was 15, in 5 families.
