= Sarmast, Kangavar =

Sarmast سرمست
- Village
- Location within Iran
- Coordinates: 34°30′19″N 47°50′28″E
- Country: Iran
- Province: Kermanshah
- County: Kangavar
- Bakhsh: Central
- Rural District: Qazvineh

Population (2006)
  - Total: 91
- Time zone: UTC+3:30 (IRST)
  - Summer (DST): UTC+4:30 (IRDT)

Sarmast (Persian: سرمست) is a village in Qazvineh Rural District, in the Central District of Kangavar County, Kermanshah Province, Iran. At the 2006 census, its population was 91, in 22 families.
