= Shokrab, Kermanshah =

Shokrab شكراب
- Village
- Location within Iran
- Coordinates: 34°31′58″N 47°54′54″E
- Country: Iran
- Province: Kermanshah
- County: Kangavar
- Bakhsh: Central
- Rural District: Fash

Population (2006)
  - Total: 169
- Time zone: UTC+3:30 (IRST)
  - Summer (DST): UTC+4:30 (IRDT)

Shokrab (Persian: شكراب, also Romanized as Shokrāb) is a village in Fash Rural District, in the Central District of Kangavar County, Kermanshah Province, Iran. At the 2006 census, its population was 169, in 36 families.
