= Shekar Ab =

Shekar Ab or Shakar Ab or Shekarab or Shokrab (Persian: شكراب) may refer to:

- Shakar Ab, Ardabil
- Shokrab, Kermanshah
- Shekar Ab, Lali, Khuzestan Province
- Shekar Ab, Masjed Soleyman, Khuzestan Province
- Shekar Ab, South Khorasan
