= Fash =

Village in Kermanshah province, Iran

Fash Persian: فش
- Village
- Location within Iran
- Coordinates: 34°34′53″N 47°56′13″E
- Country: Iran
- Province: Kermanshah
- County: Kangavar
- District: Central
- Rural District: Fash

Population (2016)
  - Total: 1,545
- Time zone: UTC+3:30 (IRST)

Fash (Persian: فش) is a village in, and the capital of, Fash Rural District of the Central District of Kangavar County, Kermanshah province, Iran.

== Demographics ==
=== Population ===
At the time of the 2006 national census, the village's population was 1,925 in 506 households. The following census in 2011 counted 1,700 people in 520 households. The 2016 census measured the population of the village as 1,545 people in 507 households. It was the most populous village in its rural district.
