= Kucheh, Iran =

Kucheh (Persian: كوچه) may refer to the following places in Iran:

- Kucheh, Kermanshah
- Kucheh, Sistan and Baluchestan
- Kucheh, Chabahar (Kuchu), Sistan and Baluchestan Province
