= Karkhaneh, Kermanshah =

Karkhaneh كارخانه
- Village
- Location within Iran
- Coordinates: 34°29′56″N 47°59′46″E
- Country: Iran
- Province: Kermanshah
- County: Kangavar
- Bakhsh: Central
- Rural District: Gowdin

Population (2006)
  - Total: 1,567
- Time zone: UTC+3:30 (IRST)
  - Summer (DST): UTC+4:30 (IRDT)

Karkhaneh (Persian: كارخانه, also Romanized as Kārkhāneh) is a village in Gowdin Rural District, in the Central District of Kangavar County, Kermanshah Province, Iran. At the 2006 census, its population was 1,567, in 392 families.
