= Firuzabad-e Tappeh =

Village in Kermanshah, Iran

Firuzabad-e Tappeh فيروزابادتپه
- Village
- Location within Iran
- Coordinates: 34°26′42″N 48°00′34″E
- Country: Iran
- Province: Kermanshah
- County: Kangavar
- Bakhsh: Central
- Rural District: Kermajan

Population (2006)
  - Total: 364
- Time zone: UTC+3:30 (IRST)
  - Summer (DST): UTC+4:30 (IRDT)

Firuzabad-e Tappeh (Persian: فيروزابادتپه, also Romanized as Fīrūzābād-e Tappeh, and Fīrūzābād Tappeh; also known as Fīrūzābād and Fīrūzābād-e Bozorg) is a village in Kermajan Rural District, in the Central District of Kangavar County, Kermanshah Province, Iran. At the 2006 census, its population was 364, in 72 families.
