= Kucheh, Kermanshah =

Kucheh کوچه
- Village
- Location within Iran
- Coordinates: 34°30′52″N 48°03′08″E
- Country: Iran
- Province: Kermanshah
- County: Kangavar
- Bakhsh: Central
- Rural District: Gowdin

Population (2006)
  - Total: 656
- Time zone: UTC+3:30 (IRST)
  - Summer (DST): UTC+4:30 (IRDT)

Kucheh (Persian: کوچه, also Romanized as Kūcheh or Koocheh; also known as Gūcheh Gūrīn and Kūcheh Gāvdīn) is a village in Gowdin Rural District, in the Central District of Kangavar County, Kermanshah Province, Iran. At the 2006 census, its population was 656, in 171 families.
