= Dehlor, Kermanshah =

Village in Kermanshah province, Iran

Dehlor Persian: دهلر
- Village
- Location within Iran
- Coordinates: 34°24′32″N 47°53′08″E
- Country: Iran
- Province: Kermanshah
- County: Kangavar
- District: Central
- Rural District: Khezel-e Gharbi

Population (2016)
  - Total: 1,023
- Time zone: UTC+3:30 (IRST)

Dehlor (Persian: دهلر) (Note: Also romanized as Deh Lor and Dehlar; also known as Deh-ī-Lūr) is a village in, and the capital of, Khezel-e Gharbi Rural District of the Central District of Kangavar County, Kermanshah province, Iran.

== Demographics ==
=== Population ===
At the time of the 2006 National Census, the village's population was 1,047 in 241 households. The following census in 2011 counted 1,219 people in 276 households. The 2016 census measured the population of the village as 1,023 people in 292 households. It was the most populous village in its rural district.
