= Kermajan =

Village in Kermanshah province, Iran

Kermajan Persian: كرماجان
- Village
- Location within Iran
- Coordinates: 34°27′11″N 47°55′43″E
- Country: Iran
- Province: Kermanshah
- County: Kangavar
- District: Central
- Rural District: Kermajan

Population (2016)
  - Total: 584
- Time zone: UTC+3:30 (IRST)

Kermajan (Persian: كرماجان) (Note: Also romanized as Kermājān; also known as Karmān Jān) is a village in, and the capital of, Kermajan Rural District of the Central District of Kangavar County, Kermanshah province, Iran.

== Demographics ==
=== Population ===
At the time of the 2006 National Census, the village's population was 663 in 161 households. The following census in 2011 counted 561 people in 163 households. The 2016 census measured the population of the village as 584 people in 185 households.
