= Sarmast (disambiguation) =

Sarmast is a city in Kermanshah Province, Iran.

Sarmast (Persian: سرمست) may also refer to:

- Sarmast, Hormozgan
- Sarmast, Kangavar, Kermanshah Province
- Sarmast, Kohgiluyeh and Boyer-Ahmad
