= Firuzabad-e Kuchak =

Firuzabad-e Kuchak فيروزابادكوچك
- Village
- Location within Iran
- Coordinates: 34°27′24″N 48°00′22″E
- Country: Iran
- Province: Kermanshah
- County: Kangavar
- Bakhsh: Central
- Rural District: Kermajan

Population (2006)
  - Total: 155
- Time zone: UTC+3:30 (IRST)
  - Summer (DST): UTC+4:30 (IRDT)

Firuzabad-e Kuchak (Persian: فيروزابادكوچك, also Romanized as Fīrūzābād-e Kūchak and Fīrūzābād-e Kūchek; also known as Fīrūzābād) is a village in Kermajan Rural District, in the Central District of Kangavar County, Kermanshah Province, Iran. At the 2006 census, its population was 155, in 39 families.
