= Darbesar =

Darbesar (Persian: داربسر) may refer to:

- Darbesar, Kermanshah
- Darbesar, West Azerbaijan
