= Parthian style =

Historical Iranian architecture

The Parthian style is a style (sabk) of historical Iranian architecture defined by Mohammad Karim Pirnia.

This architectural style includes designs from the Seleucid (310–140 BCE), Parthian (247 BCE – 224 CE), and Sassanid (224–651 CE) eras, reaching its apex of development in the Sassanid period.

Examples of this style are Ghal'eh Dokhtar, the royal compounds at Nysa, Anahita Temple, Khorheh, Hatra, the Ctesiphon vault of Kasra, Bishapur, and the Palace of Ardashir in Ardeshir Khwarreh (Firouzabad).

The Parthi style of architecture appeared after Alexander the Great's conquest of the Achaemenid Empire in the 3rd century BCE, and historically includes the Sassanid, Parthian, and post Islamic eras, up to the 9th–10th centuries. The remains of the architectural style of this period are not abundant, and although much was borrowed and incorporated from Greek designs and methods, architects and builders of this age employed many innovative concepts of their own as well.

== Gallery ==
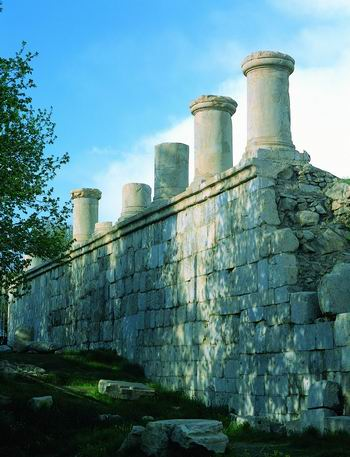
Anahita Temple Archaeological complex in Kangavar.

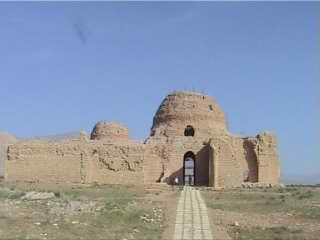
The Sassanid Palace at Sarvestan

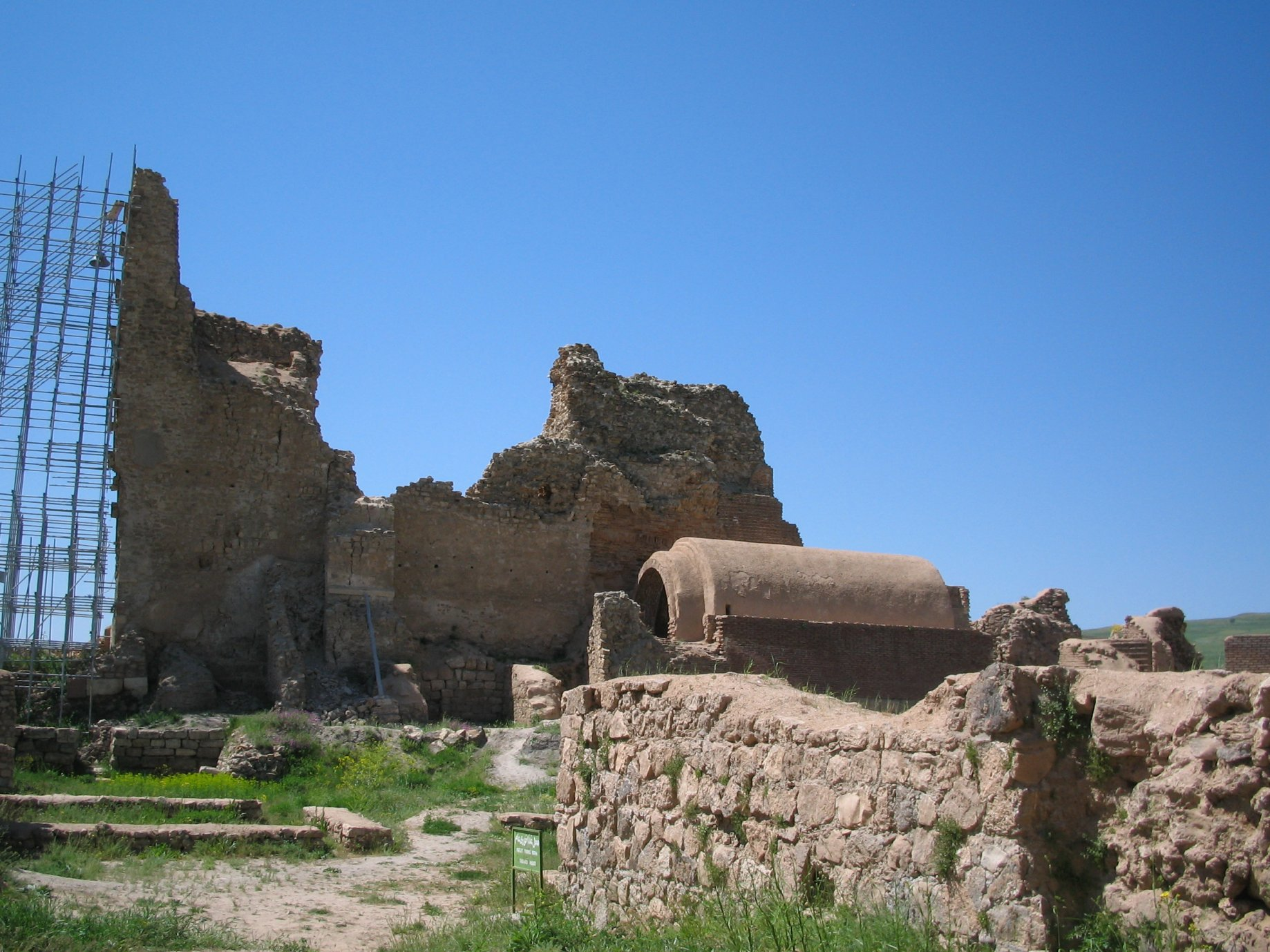
Takht-e Soleymān

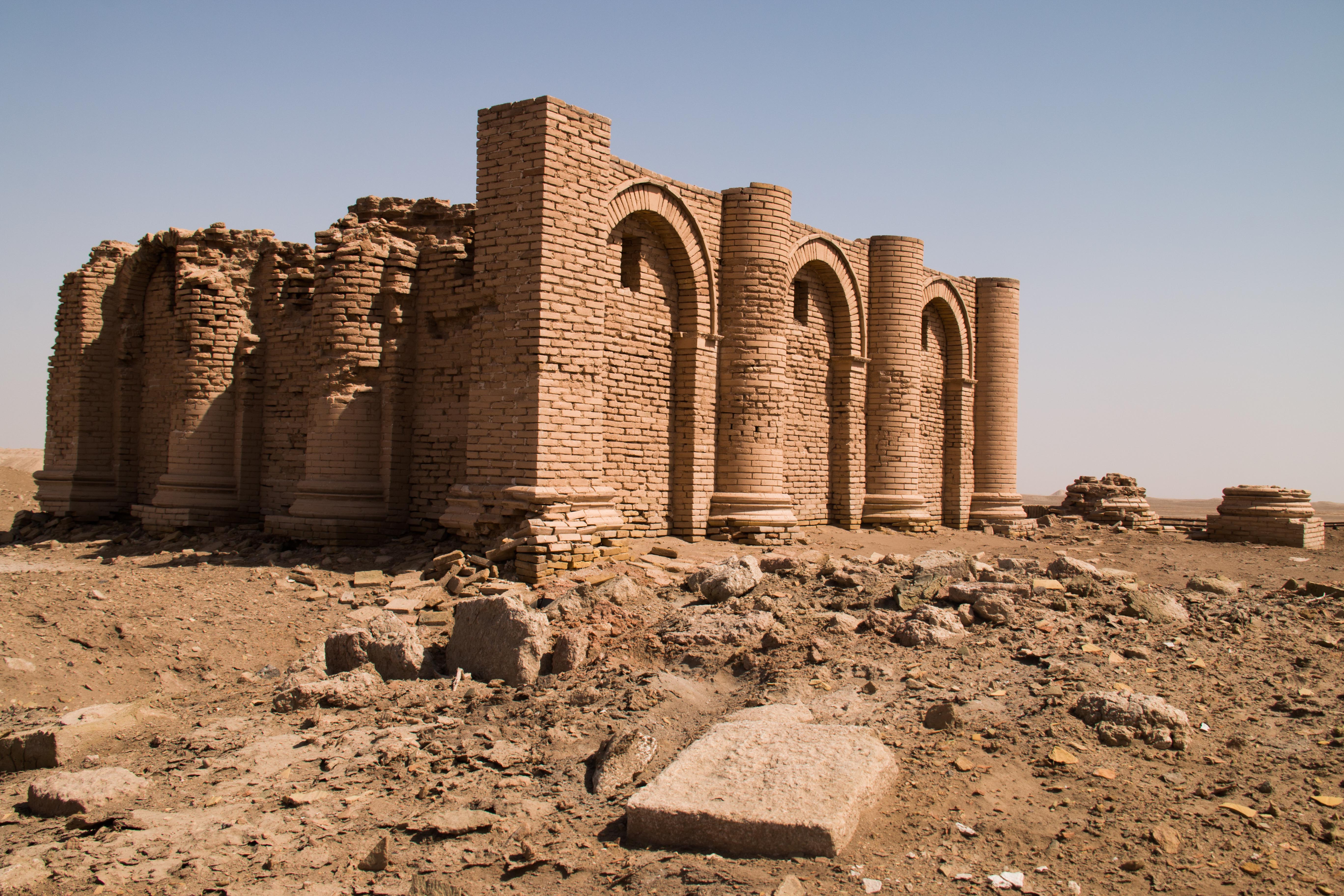
Temple of Gareus, Uruk

== See also ==
- Hellenistic architecture
- Ancient Greek architecture
