= Qazvineh =

Village in Kermanshah province, Iran

Qazvineh Persian: قزوينه
- Village
- Location within Iran
- Coordinates: 34°31′24″N 47°47′14″E
- Country: Iran
- Province: Kermanshah
- County: Kangavar
- District: Central
- Rural District: Qazvineh

Population (2016)
  - Total: 88
- Time zone: UTC+3:30 (IRST)

Qazvineh (Persian: قزوينه) (Note: Also romanized as Qazvīneh; also known as Kazvina) is a village in, and the capital of, Qazvineh Rural District of the Central District of Kangavar County, Kermanshah province, Iran.

== Demographics ==
=== Population ===
At the time of the 2006 National Census, the village's population was 173 in 46 households. The following census in 2011 counted 118 people in 40 households. The 2016 census measured the population of the village as 88 people in 31 households.
