= Qarah Guzlu =

Qarah Guzlu or Qarah Gowzlu (Persian: قره گوزلو) may refer to:

- Qarah Guzlu-ye Olya
- Qarah Guzlu-ye Sofla
