= Haftkhaneh =

Haftkhaneh or Haft Khaneh (Persian: هفت خانه) may refer to:

- Haft Khaneh, Kermanshah
- Haftkhaneh, Razavi Khorasan
