= Karkhaneh-ye Salar =

Karkhaneh-ye Salar may refer to:

- Karkhaneh Sefid Kan
- Karkhaneh-ye Hakim
