= Khar Kosh =

Khar Kosh or Khar Kesh or Kharkash (Persian: خاركش) may refer to:

- Khar Kosh, Kermanshah, a village in Kermanshah Province, Iran
- Khar Kesh, Mazandaran, a village in Mazandaran Province, Iran
