= Firozabad (disambiguation) =

Firozabad is a city in Uttar Pradesh, India.

Firozabad may also refer to:

- Firozabad district, a district of Uttar Pradesh, India, with the city as its headquarters
  - Firozabad (Lok Sabha constituency), an Indian parliamentary constituency
  - Firozabad (Assembly constituency), Uttar Pradesh Legislative Assembly
- Firozabad (Mayoral Constituency), mayors of Firozabad
- Firozabad (Delhi), historical city established by Firuz Shah Tughlaq, Sultan of Delhi, in Delhi c. 1350s, now in ruins, see Feroz Shah Kotla
- Firozabad, Karnataka, a village in Karnataka, India
- Firozabad, Karachi, neighbourhood of Karachi, Pakistan

== See also ==
- Firuzabad (disambiguation)
- Firozpur (disambiguation)
