= Seifollah Kambakhshfard =

Iranian archaeologist (1929–2010)

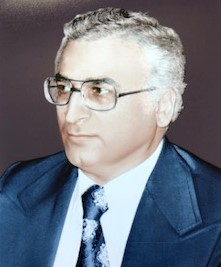
- Born: 21 March 1929; Tehran, Imperial State of Iran
- Died: 28 November 2010 (aged 81); Tehran, Iran
- Education: University of Tehran
- Scientific career
- Fields: Archaeology and Ancient History of Iran
- Workplaces: University of Tehran, 1959; Tech. Archive Div., National Museum of Iran, 1965; Ministry of Culture and Arts, Khorasan Province, 1977; National Museum of Iran, 1979

Seifollah Kambakhshfard (Persian: سیف‌الله کامبخش‌فرد; 21 March 1929 – 28 November 2010) was an Iranian archaeologist, who specialised in archaeology and Ancient history of Iran.

== Education and career summary ==
Born in Tehran, he completed his elementary education at the Adib and Dar ul-Funun schools and graduated from University of Tehran with master's degree in Archaeology in 1964. He started his career as a teacher and taught in the elementary schools while he was pursuing his postgraduate studies. He joined the prehistory division of the National Museum of Iran in 1959 and served as an assistant director of the Institute of Archaeology that operated under the University of Tehran at the time. He reached the first milestone of his career when he became the chairman of the Archive division at the National Museum of Iran in 1965. He also conducted explorations in Marlik, Rudbar, Nishapur Germi, Haft Tepe, Meshkin Shahr and Gheytarieh from 1961 to 1967.

From 1968 until 1977, He led a series of successful archaeological explorations in the Temple of Anahita, Kangavar that paved his way into further advancements. He was appointed as a General Manager of formerly known as the Ministry of Culture and Art in Khorasan province in 1977. He became the Director of the National Museum of Iran in 1979 in his final endeavor at the leadership stage and was forced to take a break while major social reforms were taking its toll in the early days of post Revolution era in Iran. Kambakhshfard returned to work force later on and served as an adviser at the Iranian Archaeology Center until his early retirement in 1986.

== Gheytarieh ==
The cemetery in the northern suburbs of Tehran has yielded material, notably spouted vessels, jugs with small handles at the neck junctions, and jugs with pouring handles. The ancient foothills of Gheytarieh is the location of the early first millennium BC in the northern district of Tehran. In 1968, most of this foothills of Gheytarieh was covered with an Iron Age cemetery containing clay pottery findings. The excavations at the Gheytarieh were carried out by Seifollah Kambakhshfard during 1968 and 1969. The results proved the city of Tehran was 3000 years old, an astonishing news to the archaeological community at the time of the discovery. The discovery of Gheytarieh civilization attracted attentions of the critically acclaimed film maker Parviz Kimiavi in the featured documentary film "The Hills of Qaytariyeh", in 1969.

Kambakhshfard presented the dazzling Art of Iranian pottery in an exhibition called "Tehran, the 3000 years old Civilization", an event that was sponsored by the National Museum of Iran in 2001. Similar event was held by National Museum of Iran, in which a collection of items such as sword, arrow tip, flags and jewelry were displayed in April 2017. Today, almost the entire ancient hills has been replaced with the urban developments and high rise apartments and shops that are built over the area.

== Temple of Anahita, Kangavar ==
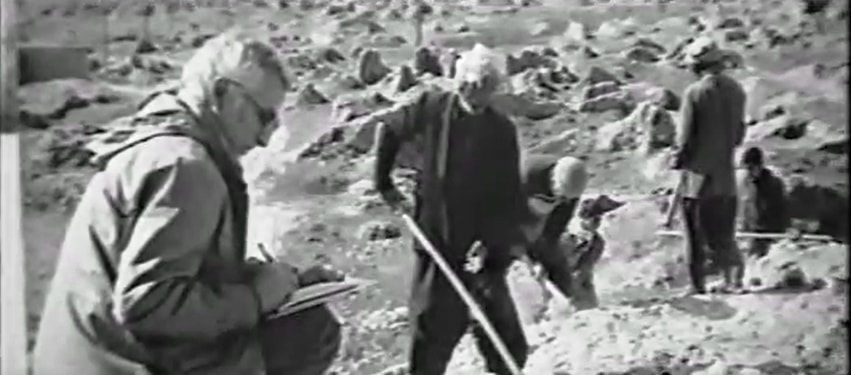
Taking notes at an archaeological dig in Kangavar, 1972

Starting in 1968, the first team of Iranian archaeologists, directed by Kambakhshfard, began their preliminary assessment of a site that was presumed to be the location of an Ancient Temple, marked by remains of some scattered pieces of stone carvings and broken column capitals.

The challenge was to uncover an ancient structure that was virtually buried beneath some 200 houses and shops that were owned by the village residents. Over the course of nine year, the entire overburden infrastructure was acquired, demolished and removed while the site underwent various phases of excavation. The team initially unearthed a Parthian Empire burial ground outside the walls of the building; fragments of Parthian, Sasanian, Islamic Pottery; a Mosque dating back to the Ilkhanate (1256–1351); and a Shrine from the Safavid era (1501–1722).

Kambakhshfard wrote in his book "I excavated the site over ten seasons of six month each, and three seasons of reconstruction and restoration and managed to unearth and expose whatever that could be seen or touched of the ruins of Anahita Temple". He worked relentlessly until 1975 and published more than 20 articles and reports in various Journals. He also published a book called "The Anahita Temple Kangavar, Archaeological Excavations and Surveys: The reconstruction and Architectural Restoration of the Nahid Temple and Taq-e Gera", in 1995, and in 2007 in two volumes which remain invaluable sources for almost any articles that has been published about the subject ever since. In 1989 and 1994 the discoveries of two column bases on top of the platform pointed the Achaemenid period as the date of the construction. Based on archaeological findings and thermoluminescence dating tests, the Temple of Anahita is associated with the Achaemenid, the Parthia, the Seleucid, the Sasanian, and the Islamic and even with the Medes periods. In Kangavar, aside from two arch bases, similar to one in Taq-e Gara, dating around first century AD which would normally be applicable in the construction of caravan towers at the Silk Road, no other arch type elements were discovered. The structure is formed with vertical walls, flat roofs, and a blend of classical Greek and Persian architecture and perhaps served colonies along the[Silk Road.

The site was further excavated by other archaeologists over a few short seasons, but it has been inactive since late 1980s. In 1981, an Archaeologist published an article called “The Excavation at Kangavar”, in the AMI journal and flagged the validity of so-called “Temple of Anahita” and proposed a “Castle” attributed to Khosro II Sassanid, instead. He argued that the idea of the “Temple of Anahita” was based on misinterpretation of a comment by the historian Isidore of Charax, in reference to the “Temple of Artemis”. He compared the temple with the Taq-e Gara whose identity was still in doubts and associated the two with the Sasanian empire on account of the similarities of their column bases. The article initially gained attention of the scholars, but it remained as a “Pure Theory” in a long run, as it was generally based on oral history and rationalization, rather than scientific measures. The Iranian National Heritage still refers to the place as “Temple of Anahita” in all its publications. The site, however is awaiting receipt of priority by Cultural Heritage Authorities to be considered on the UNESCO's World Heritage List.

== Legacy ==
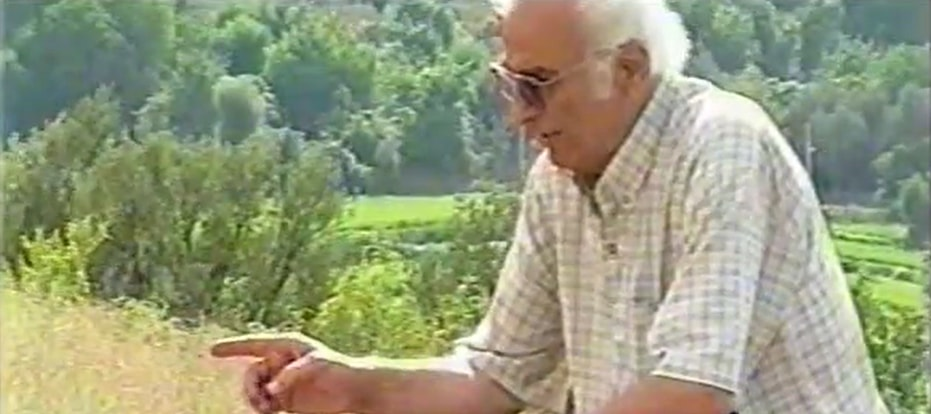
79 years old at an archaeological foothills.

Kambakhshfard worked in a number of excavations that are considered major in the field of archaeology in Iran. The discoveries of the treasures of the royal cemetery of Marlik, dating back to 3000 years ago marked his first involvement in the field. His excavations at the ancient hills of Gheytarieh revealed the civilization, dating back to the first millennium BC at a site in northern Tehran's district. He authored several books and published many reports and articles in various journals, some of which are used as references in the field of archaeology, today. He thoroughly documented his works and gave such a clear snapshot of how the sites once were, so they can be reinstated even if they have physically been destroyed.

== In the media ==
He presented his work in seminars across the country and appeared on occasion as a guest speaker on Iranian National TV.

== Books ==
1. Excavations in Nishapur and pottery in Iran in 5th and 6th century AH, Ministry of Culture and Arts, Tehran, Iran, 1970.
2. Tehran 3200 years old settlement, Archaeological Discoveries, تهران سه هزار و دویست ساله, Tehran, Iran, 1991.
3. The Parthian Pithos-Burials at Germi, Azerbaijan گورخمره های اشکانی, University Press, Tehran, Iran, 1998.
4. The Pottery in Iran from the beginning of Neolithic to contemporary سفال و سفالگری در ایران از ابتدای نوسنگی تا دوران معاصر, Ghoghnoos, Tehran, Iran, 2000.
5. The Iranian Antiquities, آثار تاریخی ایران, Ghoghnoos, Tehran, Iran, 2000.
6. A Glance at Tehran 3000 years ago, نگاهی‌ به تهران در سه هزار سال پیش, the Iranian National Heritage Organization, Tehran, Iran, 2001.
7. The Exploration and Reconstruction of Anahita Temple and Taq-e Gara Structure, |vo1| کاوش ها و پژوهش های باستان شناسی و احیا معماری معبد آناهیتا کنگاور و تاق گرا, the Iranian National Heritage Organization, Tehran, Iran, 2007 ISBN 978-964-421-111-9 978-964-421-113-3.
8. The Exploration and Reconstruction of Anahita Temple and Taq-e Gara Structure, |vo2| کاوش ها و پژوهش های باستان شناسی و احیا معماری معبد آناهیتا کنگاور و تاق گرا, the Iranian National Heritage Organization, Tehran, Iran, 2007 ISBN 978-964-421-112-6 - 978-964-421-113-3

== Articles ==
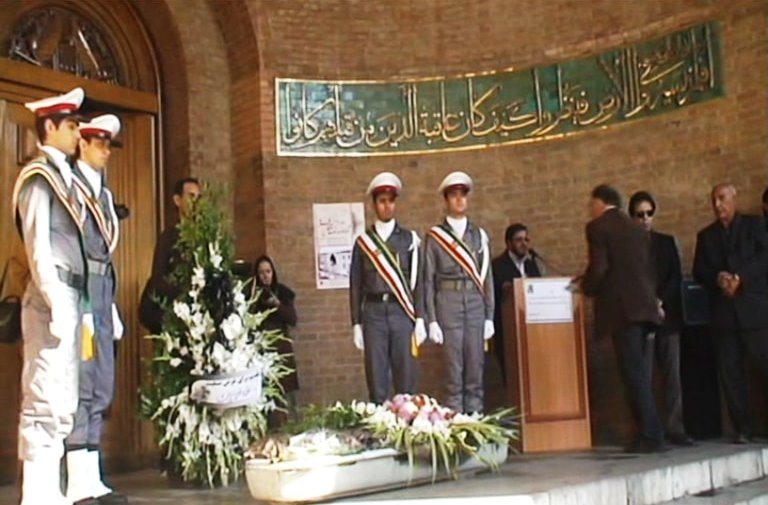
A special ceremony was held prior to his funeral in front of the National Museum of Iran.

- 1965 The Republic Castle or Papak Fort, Journal of Historical Studies, Year 1, 2, No. 4, pp. 28–1.
- 1966 The Republic Castle or Papak Fort, Journal of Historical Studies, Year 2, No. 50, pp. 7–2.
- 1966 The Remains of Parthian Villages, Historical Surveys, Year 2, No. 1, pp. 25–5.
- 1966 The Sassanid Pahlavi Inscriptions (Azar Narseeh, Shapur II) in Meshkin-Shahr, Journal of Art and People, No. 61–62, 1966, pp. 10–6.
- 1967 The 5th Iranian Archeological and Art Seminar, Journal of Art and the People, No. 70, pp. 5–2.
- 1967 The Stone Inscriptions in Sabalan, Journal of Archeology and Art in Iran, No. 1, pp. 60–55.
- 1968 The Stone Inscriptions of Urartu and Sassanian Pahlavi scripts in Azerbaijan, International Archaeological Society, Tehran, Iran.
- 1969 The Excavations of The Tombs in Gheytarieh, Journal of Archaeology and Art in Iran, pp. 58–68, 12 fig.
- 1970 Gheytarieh, Iran, Journal of the British Institute of Persian Studies VIII, pp. 180.
- 1969 The Stone Inscriptions of Bisotun, Taq Bostan and Excavations in Kangavar, Memoir of the Archeological Convention in Tehran, National Museum of Iran.
- 1971 The Archeological Exploration of Temple of Anahita, Kangavar, Journal of Archeology and Art in Iran, No. 6, pp. 32–10.
- 1972 Temple of Anahita, International Archeological Society, Oxford, England.
- 1973 The Temple of Anahita, Discoveries and Reconstruction, 3rd Annual Archaeological Research and Exploration Conference in Tehran, National Museum of Iran, pp. 19–10.
- 1974 The Temple of Anahita, Discoveries and Reconstruction, 3rd Annual Archaeological Research and Exploration Conference in Tehran, National Museum of Iran, pp. 90–73.
- 1976 The Exploration and Reconstruction of the Temple of Anahita, Kangavar, Iranian Journal of Culture and Architecture, National Organization for Antiquities, No. 4, pp. 51–76.
- 1994 Archaeological studies in Azarshahr, Maragheh, Journal of the Iranian National Heritage Organization, No. 12, pp. 164–129.
- 1995 An Account of Archaeological Excavations in the eastern Foothills of Gilan, Northern Iran, Journal of Archaeology and History, Center for Collegiate publication, No.17, pp. 16–33.
- 1996 Metallurgy and Pottery Works in Marlik, Iranian Journal of Archeology and History, vol. 9, No. 2, (1995), pp. 27–38, 14 fig.
- 2006 Architectural Formation of Temple of Anahita Throughout History, The History of Architecture and Urban development in Iran, 1st Congress of Bam Citadel, Kerman, J1, pp. 26–40.

– Sources:

== Death ==
He died at home, shortly after his release from a local hospital, following a period of suffering from heart and respiratory conditions on November 28, 2010, in Tehran. A special event was held at the National Museum of Iran, prior to his funeral ceremony with participation of archaeologists, scholars and guest speakers.

== See also ==
- List of archaeologists
