= Qarah Guzlu-ye Sofla =

Village in Kermanshah province, Iran

Qarah Guzlu-ye Sofla Persian: قره گوزلو سفلي
- Village
- Location within Iran
- Coordinates: 34°30′19″N 47°53′20″E
- Country: Iran
- Province: Kermanshah
- County: Kangavar
- District: Central
- Rural District: Qazvineh

Population (2016)
  - Total: 386
- Time zone: UTC+3:30 (IRST)

Qarah Guzlu-ye Sofla (Persian: قره گوزلوسفلي) (Note: Also romanized as Qarah Gūzlū-ye Soflá) is a village in Qazvineh Rural District of the Central District of Kangavar County, Kermanshah province, Iran.

== Demographics ==
=== Population ===
At the time of the 2006 National Census, the village's population was 423 in 99 households. The following census in 2011 counted 385 people in 101 households. The 2016 census measured the population of the village as 386 people in 116 households. It was the most populous village in its rural district.
