= Gowdin =

City in Kermanshah province, Iran

Gowdin Persian: گودين
- City
- Location within Iran
- Coordinates: 34°30′27″N 48°04′45″E
- Country: Iran
- Province: Kermanshah
- County: Kangavar
- District: Central

Population (2016)
  - Total: 2,629
- Time zone: UTC+3:30 (IRST)

Gowdin (Persian: گودين) (Note: Also romanized as Gāvdīn and Gowdīn) is a city in the Central District of Kangavar County, Kermanshah province, Iran, serving as the administrative center for Gowdin Rural District.

== Demographics ==
=== Population ===
At the time of the 2006 National Census, Gowdin's population was 3,200 in 867 households, when it was a village in Gowdin Rural District. The following census in 2011 counted 3,068 people in 921 households. The 2016 census measured the population as 2,629 people in 835 households, by which time the village had been elevated to the status of a city.
