= Firozpur (disambiguation) =

Firozpur is a city in Punjab, India.

Firozpur may also refer to:

== Entities named after the city of Firozpur, Punjab ==
- Firozpur District, the administrative district headquartered at Firozpur
- Firozpur Lok Sabha constituency, a constituency in the Lok Sabha
- Firozpur City Assembly constituency, a constituency in the Punjab Legislative Assembly
- Firozpur Rural Assembly constituency, a constituency in the Punjab Legislative Assembly
- Firozpur Cantonment, a separate municipality right next to Firozpur
  - Firozpur Cantonment railway station

== Other places ==
- Firozpur, Ghazipur, a village in Uttar Pradesh
- Firozpur, Mainpuri, a village in Uttar Pradesh
- Firozpur Jhirka, a town in Nuh district, Haryana

== See also ==
- Firozabad (disambiguation)
