= Massoud Azarnoush =

Iranian archaeologist (1945–2008)

Massoud Azarnoush (25 March 1945 – 27 November 2008) was an Iranian archaeologist.

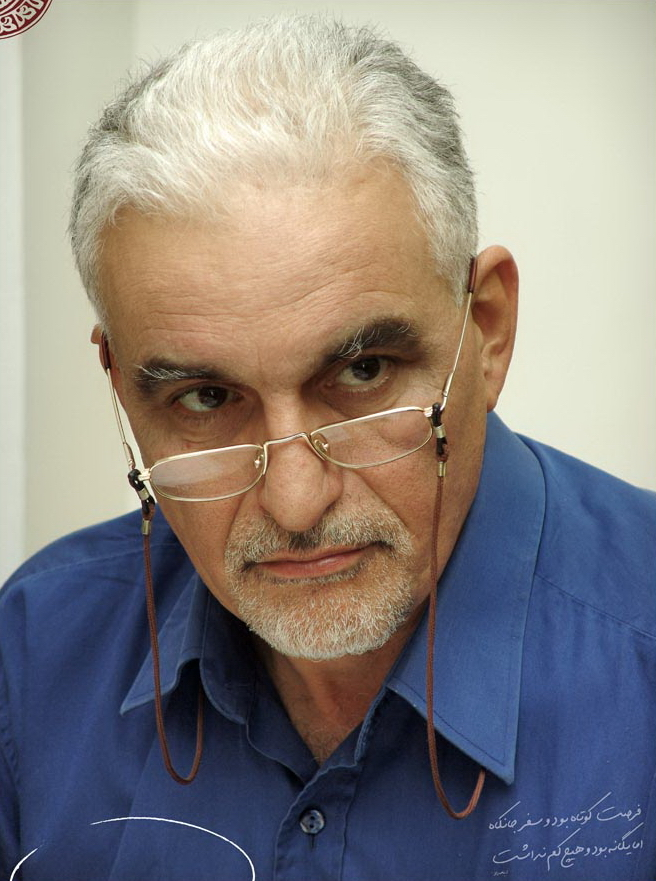
M.Azarnoush-Iranian archaeologist (2)

He was born in Kermanshah. He received his MA from the department of archaeology at University of Tehran in 1972 and his PhD from the University of California, Los Angeles in 1985. After returning to Iran, he taught at the University of Tehran before taking up the direction of the Iranian Center for Archaeological Research. He had a fundamental role in reorganizing the ICAR in its new building in the Mas'udieh Palace. Azarnoush helped young archaeologists and students to join to the ICAR and participate in various archaeological research and activities. Although his career was historical archaeology, but he had a keen interest in developing research on the pre- and proto-history of Iran, especially Paleolithic studies. He emphasized the importance of interdisciplinary studies such as archaeobotany and zooarchaeology. Azarnoush welcomed international cooperation, and the series of rescue excavations in the Bulaghi gorge near Pasargadae in cooperation with teams from Germany, France, Poland has been one of the rare successes of archaeological fieldwork in Iran during the past 20 years. He excavated at important sites such as Kangavar, Hamadan, Susa, and Hajiabad where he found a Sassanian manor house at with stucco decorations, which served the basis for his doctoral dissertation and book. He was preparing a field project at the Parthian remains at Qaleh Yazdgird near Kermanshah. He re-investigated Tepe Hegmataneh in Hamadan. His excavations demonstrated that the actual remains date to the Parthian period at the earliest. Median Ecbatana should be sought elsewhere. He died of a heart attack on his return from the excavations at Hamadan at the age of 63.

== Selected bibliography ==
- Azarnoush, M. 1987 Sassanian Art in Eastern Fars: The excavation of a manor house at Hajiabad, Darab, Iran, 346 p., Ph.D. thesis, University of California, Los Angeles.
- Azarnoush, M. 1991 From Persepolis to al-Fustat: Continuation of Achaemenid Architectural Concepts, Proceedings of the Second European Conference of Iranian Studies. Held in Bamberg, 30 September - 4 October 1991. B.G. Fragner - C. Fragner - G. Gnoli - R. Haag-Higuchi - M. Maggi and P. Orsatti (eds.). Roma.
- Azarnoush, M.1994 The Sasanian Manor House at Hajiabad, Iran. Firenze, Le Lettere Coll. Monografie di Mesopotamia
- Azarnoush, M., 1999, Kangavar, un temple seleucide d'Anahita devient un monument sassanide, Dossiers d'archéologie. Empires perses d'Alexandre aux Sassanide
- Azarnoush, M. and B. Helwing, 2005 Recent Archaeological Research in Iran - Prehistory to Iron Age. Archaeologische Mitteilungen aus Iran und Turan vol. 37.
