= Firuzabad, Mashhad =

Firuzabad فيروزاباد
- Village
- Location within Iran
- Coordinates: 36°38′44″N 59°41′04″E
- Country: Iran
- Province: Razavi Khorasan
- County: Mashhad
- Bakhsh: Central
- Rural District: Kardeh

Population (2006)
  - Total: 45
- Time zone: UTC+3:30 (IRST)
  - Summer (DST): UTC+4:30 (IRDT)

Firuzabad (Persian: فيروزاباد, also Romanized as Fīrūzābād; also known as Mīrzāvā, Pīrzāvā, Pīrzawa, and Pīrzū) is a village in Kardeh Rural District, in the Central District of Mashhad County, Razavi Khorasan Province, Iran. At the 2006 census, its population was 45, in 13 families.
