= Firuzabad-e Tayemeh =

Firuzabad-e Tayemeh فيروزآباد طايمه
- Village
- Location within Iran
- Coordinates: 34°18′36″N 48°16′27″E
- Country: Iran
- Province: Hamadan
- County: Nahavand
- Bakhsh: Central
- Rural District: Tariq ol Eslam

Population (2006)
  - Total: 258
- Time zone: UTC+3:30 (IRST)
  - Summer (DST): UTC+4:30 (IRDT)

Firuzabad-e Tayemeh (Persian: فيروزآباد طايمه, also Romanized as Fīrūzābād-e Ţāyemeh; also known as Fīrūzābād) is a village in Tariq ol Eslam Rural District, in the Central District of Nahavand County, Hamadan Province, Iran. At the 2006 census, its population was 258, with 72 families.
