= Darbesar, West Azerbaijan =

Darbesar داربسر
- Village
- Location within Iran
- Coordinates: 36°32′13″N 46°05′21″E
- Country: Iran
- Province: West Azerbaijan
- County: Bukan
- Bakhsh: Central
- Rural District: Akhtachi

Population (2006)
  - Total: 236
- Time zone: UTC+3:30 (IRST)
  - Summer (DST): UTC+4:30 (IRDT)

Darbesar (Persian: داربسر, also Romanized as Dārbesar) is a village in Akhtachi Rural District, in the Central District of Bukan County, West Azerbaijan Province, Iran. At the 2006 census, its population was 236, in 43 families.
