= Rahmanabad, Irandegan =

Rahmanabad رحمان اباد
- Village
- Location within Iran
- Coordinates: 27°40′47″N 61°03′14″E
- Country: Iran
- Province: Sistan and Baluchestan
- County: Khash
- Bakhsh: Irandegan
- Rural District: Kahnuk

Population (2006)
  - Total: 125
- Time zone: UTC+3:30 (IRST)
  - Summer (DST): UTC+4:30 (IRDT)

Rahmanabad (Persian: رحمان اباد, also Romanized as Raḩmānābād) is a village in Kahnuk Rural District, Irandegan District, Khash County, Sistan and Baluchestan Province, Iran. At the 2006 census, its population was 125, in 33 families.
