= Soleymanabad, Kerman =

Soleymanabad سليمان اباد
- Village
- Location within Iran
- Coordinates: 30°50′01″N 56°31′29″E
- Country: Iran
- Province: Kerman
- County: Zarand
- Bakhsh: Central
- Rural District: Mohammadabad

Population (2006)
  - Total: 848
- Time zone: UTC+3:30 (IRST)
  - Summer (DST): UTC+4:30 (IRDT)

Soleymanabad (Persian: سليمان اباد, also Romanized as Soleymānābād and Soleiman Abad; also known as Sulaimānābād) is a village in Mohammadabad Rural District, in the Central District of Zarand County, Kerman Province, Iran. At the 2006 census, its population was 848, in 199 families.
