= Firuzabad Castle =

Castle in Sistan and Baluchestan Province, Iran

Firuzabad castle
- قلعه فیروزآباد

General information
- Type: Castle
- Location: Sarbaz County, Iran

Firuzabad castle (Persian: قلعه فیروزآباد) is a historical castle located in Sarbaz County in Sistan and Baluchestan Province, The longevity of this fortress dates back to the Historical periods after Islam.
