= Soleymanabad, Buin Zahra =

Soleymanabad سليمان اباد
- Village
- Location within Iran
- Coordinates: 36°00′05″N 49°53′29″E
- Country: Iran
- Province: Qazvin
- County: Buin Zahra
- Bakhsh: Dashtabi
- Rural District: Dashtabi-ye Gharbi

Population (2006)
  - Total: 239
- Time zone: UTC+3:30 (IRST)
  - Summer (DST): UTC+4:30 (IRDT)

Soleymanabad (Persian: سليمان اباد, also Romanized as Soleymānābād) is a village in Dashtabi-ye Gharbi Rural District, Dashtabi District, Buin Zahra County, Qazvin Province, Iran. At the 2006 census, its population was 239, in 47 families.
