= Firuzabad-e Toluy =

Firuzabad-e Toluy فيروزابادطلوع
- Village
- Location within Iran
- Coordinates: 33°32′12″N 56°54′34″E
- Country: Iran
- Province: South Khorasan
- County: Tabas
- Bakhsh: Central
- Rural District: Golshan

Population (2006)
  - Total: 17
- Time zone: UTC+3:30 (IRST)
  - Summer (DST): UTC+4:30 (IRDT)

Firuzabad-e Toluy (Persian: فيروزابادطلوع, also Romanized as Fīrūzābād-e Ţolūy; also known as Fīrūzābād and Tolūī) is a village in Golshan Rural District, in the Central District of Tabas County, South Khorasan Province, Iran. At the 2006 census, its population was 17, in 5 families.
