= Firuzabad-e Pacheqa =

Village in Kermanshah, Iran

Firuzabad-e Pacheqa فيروزابادپاچقا
- Village
- Location within Iran
- Coordinates: 34°03′49″N 47°14′21″E
- Country: Iran
- Province: Kermanshah
- County: Kermanshah
- Bakhsh: Firuzabad
- Rural District: Sar Firuzabad

Population (2006)
  - Total: 247
- Time zone: UTC+3:30 (IRST)
  - Summer (DST): UTC+4:30 (IRDT)

Firuzabad-e Pacheqa (Persian: فيروزابادپاچقا, also Romanized as Fīrūzābād-e Pācheqā and Fīrūzābād Pāchoqā; also known as Fīrūzābād) is a village in Sar Firuzabad Rural District, Firuzabad District, Kermanshah County, Kermanshah Province, Iran. At the 2006 census, its population was 247, in 53 families.
