= Ulanlar =

Ulanlar اولنلر
- Village
- Location within Iran
- Coordinates: 39°18′58″N 44°41′00″E
- Country: Iran
- Province: West Azerbaijan
- County: Maku
- Bakhsh: Central
- Rural District: Chaybasar-e Jonubi

Population (2006)
  - Total: 219
- Time zone: UTC+3:30 (IRST)
  - Summer (DST): UTC+4:30 (IRDT)

Ulanlar (Persian: اولنلر, also Romanized as Ūlanlar; also known as Raḩmānābād and Ūranar) is a village in Chaybasar-e Jonubi Rural District, in the Central District of Maku County, West Azerbaijan Province, Iran. At the 2006 census, its population was 219, in 48 families.
