= Firuzabad, Bampur-e Gharbi =

Firuzabad فيروزاباد
- Village
- Location within Iran
- Coordinates: 27°09′00″N 60°30′17″E
- Country: Iran
- Province: Sistan and Baluchestan
- County: Bampur
- Bakhsh: Central
- Rural District: Bampur-e Gharbi

Population (2006)
  - Total: 212
- Time zone: UTC+3:30 (IRST)
  - Summer (DST): UTC+4:30 (IRDT)

Firuzabad (Persian: فيروزاباد, also Romanized as Fīrūzābād) is a village in Bampur-e Gharbi Rural District, Central District, Bampur County, Sistan and Baluchestan Province, Iran. At the 2006 census, its population was 212, in 41 families.
