= Soleymanabad, Tehran =

Soleymanabad, Tehran may refer to:

- Salmian, in Malard County
- Salmanabad, Fashapuyeh, in Rey County
