= Rahmanabad, Iranshahr =

Rahmanabad رحمان اباد
- Village
- Country: Iran
- Province: Sistan and Baluchestan
- County: Iranshahr
- Bakhsh: Central
- Rural District: Howmeh

Population (2006)
  - Total: 105
- Time zone: UTC+3:30 (IRST)
  - Summer (DST): UTC+4:30 (IRDT)

Rahmanabad (Persian: رحمان اباد, also Romanized as Raḩmānābād) is a village in Howmeh Rural District, in the Central District of Iranshahr County, Sistan and Baluchestan Province, Iran. At the 2006 census, its population was 105, in 16 families.
