= Karkhaneh, Markazi =

Karkhaneh كارخانه
- Village
- Location within Iran
- Coordinates: 33°43′06″N 49°14′39″E
- Country: Iran
- Province: Markazi
- County: Shazand
- Bakhsh: Sarband
- Rural District: Hendudar

Population (2006)
  - Total: 51
- Time zone: UTC+3:30 (IRST)
  - Summer (DST): UTC+4:30 (IRDT)

Karkhaneh (Persian: كارخانه, also Romanized as Kārkhāneh) This village is located in Hendudar Rural District and according to the census of the Statistical Center of Iran in 2006, its population was 51 people. In 2010, its population was about 11 people, which is why this village does not have a village headman, but as a rural area, its population reaches about 60 people, most of whom come from the big cities of Tehran and Arak.

The majority of the people in this village a hundred years ago were Jews who were from the Qashqai tribe of Shiraz and were exiled to this area.Hendudar Rural District, Sarband District, Shazand County, Markazi Province, Iran. At the 2006 census, its population was 51, in 13 families.The first family to enter this area was the Rahimi family, of which only information is available from Mr. Nazar Khan, the founder of this village, who is from the Qashqai tribe of Shiraz.
