= Soleymanabad, Dalahu =

Soleymanabad سليمان اباد
- Village
- Location within Iran
- Coordinates: 34°14′43″N 46°15′14″E
- Country: Iran
- Province: Kermanshah
- County: Dalahu
- Bakhsh: Central
- Rural District: Howmeh-ye Kerend

Population (2006)
  - Total: 225
- Time zone: UTC+3:30 (IRST)
  - Summer (DST): UTC+4:30 (IRDT)

Soleymanabad (Persian: سليمان اباد, also Romanized as Soleymānābād) is a village in Howmeh-ye Kerend Rural District, in the Central District of Dalahu County, Kermanshah Province, Iran. At the 2006 census, its population was 225, in 53 families.
