= Shekar Ab, Lali =

Shekar Ab شكراب
- Village
- Location within Iran
- Coordinates: 32°27′19″N 49°10′24″E
- Country: Iran
- Province: Khuzestan
- County: Lali
- Bakhsh: Hati
- Rural District: Hati

Population (2006)
  - Total: 110
- Time zone: UTC+3:30 (IRST)
  - Summer (DST): UTC+4:30 (IRDT)

Shekar Ab (Persian: شكراب, also Romanized as Shekar Āb) is a village in Hati Rural District, Hati District, Lali County, Khuzestan Province, Iran. At the 2006 census, its population was 110, in 22 families.
