= Kucheh, Sistan and Baluchestan =

Kucheh كوچه
- Village
- Location within Iran
- Coordinates: 27°20′10″N 60°45′51″E
- Country: Iran
- Province: Sistan and Baluchestan
- County: Iranshahr
- Bakhsh: Central
- Rural District: Damen

Population (2006)
  - Total: 153
- Time zone: UTC+3:30 (IRST)
  - Summer (DST): UTC+4:30 (IRDT)

Kucheh (Persian: كوچه, also Romanized as Kūcheh; also known as Kūchā Bālā, Kūcheh Bālā, and Kūcheh-ye Bālā) is a village in Damen Rural District, in the Central District of Iranshahr County, Sistan and Baluchestan Province, Iran. At the 2006 census, its population was 153, in 30 families.
