= List of mayors of Firozabad =

Firozabad Mayoral Constituency is one of the seventeen mayoral constituencies of Uttar Pradesh, India.

== Election results 2023 ==
Uttar Pradesh Local Body Election, 2023: Firozabad
Party	Candidate	Votes	%	±%
BJP	Kamini Rathore	1,01,416	36.03	
SP	Masroor Fatima	74,447	26.45	
BSP	Rukhsana Begam	52,695	18.72	
Independent Candidate	Ujjwal Gupta	22,536	8.01	
INC	Nuzhat	6,716	2.39	
Jan Adhikar Party	Shashi Devi	6,051	2.15	
Majority		26,969	36	
Turnout		2,81,494	49.93	
BJP hold		Swing		

== Election results 2017 ==
Uttar Pradesh Local Body Election, 2017: Firozabad
Party	Candidate	Votes	%	±%
BJP	Nutan Rathore	98,932	34.99	
AIMIM	Masroor Fatima	56,536	19.99	
SP	Savitri Gupta	45,925	16.24	
BSP	Payal Rathore	41,528	14.69	
INC	Shahjahan Parveen	13,936	4.93	
NOTA	None of the Above	2,385	0.84	
Majority		42,396	15.00	
Turnout		2,82,771	56.16	
BJP win (new seat)				
