= Mohammad Karim Pirnia =

Iranian architectural historian and architect (1920–1997)

- Born: 16 September 1920; Yazd, Sublime State of Iran
- Died: 31 August 1997 (aged 76); Tehran, Iran
- Resting place: Rasoulian House, Yazd
- Occupations: Architect, Historian

Mohammad Karim Pirnia (Persian: محمد کریم پیرنیا, 16 September 1920 – 31 August 1997) was an Iranian architectural historian and architect.

== Early life ==
Born in Yazd, Iran, he studied at what came to be University of Tehran's School of Fine Arts.

== Works ==
Pirnia, a student of traditional Iranian architecture, was one of the early architectural historians that developed a modern language to describe traditional Iranian architecture. His most prominent thoughts were later compiled as books and articles; among them “the Principles of Iranian Architecture” and “the Stylistics of Iranian Architecture” were more widely acclaimed. In the former, he proposes five principles and in the latter, he defines six historical styles (sabk) for Iranian architecture.
