= Firuzabad, Hamadan =

Firuzabad فيروزاباد
- Village
- Location within Iran
- Coordinates: 34°41′39″N 49°05′39″E
- Country: Iran
- Province: Hamadan
- County: Hamadan
- Bakhsh: Shara
- Rural District: Shur Dasht

Population (2006)
  - Total: 67
- Time zone: UTC+3:30 (IRST)
  - Summer (DST): UTC+4:30 (IRDT)

Firuzabad (Persian: فيروزاباد, also Romanized as Fīrūzābād; also known as Pīrūzābād) is a village in Shur Dasht Rural District, Shara District, Hamadan County, Hamadan Province, Iran. At the 2006 census, its population was 67, in 15 families.
