= Karkhaneh-ye Hakim =

Karkhaneh-ye Hakim كارخانه حكيمي
- Village
- Location within Iran
- Coordinates: 33°49′29″N 48°44′49″E
- Country: Iran
- Province: Lorestan
- County: Borujerd
- Bakhsh: Central
- Rural District: Hemmatabad

Population (2006)
  - Total: 166
- Time zone: UTC+3:30 (IRST)
  - Summer (DST): UTC+4:30 (IRDT)

Karkhaneh-ye Hakim (Persian: كارخانه حكيمي, also Romanized as Kārkhāneh-ye Ḩakīm and Kārkhāneh-ye Ḩakīmī; also known as Kārkhāneh Folāndasht (Persian: كارخانه فلاندشت), also Romanized as Kārkhāneh-ye Folān Dasht and Kārkhāneh-ye Fūn Dasht; also known as Kārkhāneh, Kārkuneh, and Karkhāneh Sālār) is a village in Hemmatabad Rural District, in the Central District of Borujerd County, Lorestan Province, Iran. At the 2006 census, its population was 166, in 34 families.
