= Kangavar =

City in Kermanshah province, Iran

Kangavar Persian: کنگاور
- City
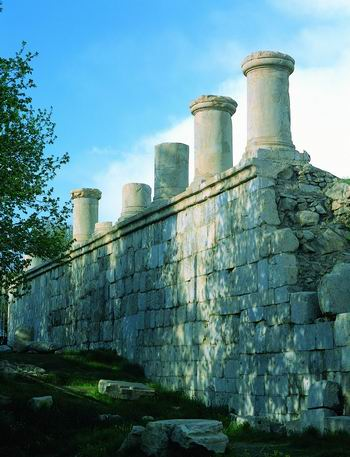
- The columns of the remains of the "Anahita Temple"

- Location within Iran
- Coordinates: 34°30′15″N 47°57′35″E
- Country: Iran
- Province: Kermanshah
- County: Kangavar
- District: Central

Population (2016)
  - Total: 51,352
- Time zone: UTC+3:30 (IRST)

Kangavar (Persian: کنگاور) (Note: Also romanized as Kangāvar; (Kurdish: که‌نگاوه‌)) is a city in the Central District of Kangavar County, Kermanshah province, Iran, serving as capital of both the county and the district.

Kangavar is in the easternmost part of Kermanshah province, on the modern road from Hamadan to Kermanshah, identical with a trace of the Silk Road, located at the distance of about 75 km from Hamadan and 96 km from Kermanshah.

== History ==
Kangavar was mentioned by Isidore of Charax in the 1st century AD, by the name of "Konkobar" or "Concobar" (Greek: Κογκοβάρ) in the ancient province of Ecbatana (modern Hamedan). In antiquity, the city was in Media, with a temple of Artemis (Isidor. Char. p. 7; Tab. Pent.; Geogr. Rav.)

In the early 20th century, Kangavar was held in fief by the family of a deceased court official, forming a separate government. Today, the town is best known for the archaeological remains of a mixed Sassanid and Achaemenid-style edifice. During the 19th century and the beginning of the 20th century, the ruins were misused as a source for building material for the expanding town. Excavation first began in 1968, by which time the "large structure with its great columns set on a high stone platform" had been associated with a comment by Isidore of Charax, that refers to a "temple of Artemis" (Parthian Stations 6) at "Concobar" in Lower Media, on the overland trade route between the Levant and India. References to Artemis in Iran are generally interpreted to be references to Anahita, and thus Isidore's "temple of Artemis" came to be understood as a reference to a temple of Anahita.

Although a general plan of the complex has been compiled, it is still not sufficient to learn about the function and shape of the terrace and the buildings that stood there. Given the lack of archaeological evidence for a temple-like building, "it is questionable whether the [temple noted by Isodore] is identical with the ruins of Kangavar. Isidorus described obviously another temple of the first century AD, somewhere in the region of Congobar (Kangavar) or at the place of the later platform, which, according to the results of the excavation, seems to be built up in Sasanian times."

== Climate ==
Climate data for Kangavar (1987-2010 normals and records), elevation: 1,468 m (4,816 ft)
Month	Jan	Feb	Mar	Apr	May	Jun	Jul	Aug	Sep	Oct	Nov	Dec	Year
Record high °C (°F)	17.4 (63.3)	20.4 (68.7)	26.8 (80.2)	33.0 (91.4)	34.6 (94.3)	39.4 (102.9)	41.6 (106.9)	40.6 (105.1)	37.2 (99.0)	31.8 (89.2)	25.4 (77.7)	22.0 (71.6)	41.6 (106.9)
Mean daily maximum °C (°F)	5.4 (41.7)	8.2 (46.8)	13.9 (57.0)	19.6 (67.3)	25.3 (77.5)	32.1 (89.8)	36.3 (97.3)	36.1 (97.0)	31.3 (88.3)	24.3 (75.7)	15.5 (59.9)	9.4 (48.9)	21.5 (70.6)
Daily mean °C (°F)	−0.1 (31.8)	2.4 (36.3)	7.1 (44.8)	11.9 (53.4)	16.2 (61.2)	21.1 (70.0)	25.3 (77.5)	24.8 (76.6)	19.9 (67.8)	14.8 (58.6)	8.3 (46.9)	3.6 (38.5)	12.9 (55.3)
Mean daily minimum °C (°F)	−5.7 (21.7)	−3.5 (25.7)	0.4 (32.7)	4.2 (39.6)	7.1 (44.8)	10.1 (50.2)	14.3 (57.7)	13.6 (56.5)	8.4 (47.1)	5.3 (41.5)	1.1 (34.0)	−2.2 (28.0)	4.4 (40.0)
Record low °C (°F)	−28.6 (−19.5)	−29.5 (−21.1)	−18.4 (−1.1)	−5.6 (21.9)	0.2 (32.4)	2.8 (37.0)	7.0 (44.6)	5.2 (41.4)	1.0 (33.8)	−3.4 (25.9)	−10.0 (14.0)	−21.0 (−5.8)	−29.5 (−21.1)
Average precipitation mm (inches)	51.9 (2.04)	55.4 (2.18)	64.3 (2.53)	55.3 (2.18)	23.9 (0.94)	1.3 (0.05)	1.5 (0.06)	0.4 (0.02)	0.9 (0.04)	25.9 (1.02)	57.0 (2.24)	54.9 (2.16)	392.7 (15.46)
Average precipitation days (≥ 0)	11.1	11.5	11.2	11.0	7.2	1.5	0.8	0.6	0.6	5.7	8.0	9.6	78.8
Average snowy days	7.4	5.0	1.7	0	0	0	0	0	0	0	0.4	3.1	17.6
Average relative humidity (%)	76	70	60	58	51	38	30	29	31	44	64	72	52
Average dew point °C (°F)	−4.9 (23.2)	−3.6 (25.5)	−1.4 (29.5)	2.8 (37.0)	5.1 (41.2)	5.2 (41.4)	5.9 (42.6)	4.7 (40.5)	1.1 (34.0)	0.8 (33.4)	0.3 (32.5)	−2.3 (27.9)	1.1 (34.1)
Mean monthly sunshine hours	150.1	161.0	210.3	233.5	304.7	351.7	358.7	344.8	310.8	254.1	188.5	156.1	3,024.3
Source: Iran Meteorological Organization(temperatures), (extremes), (sun), (precipitation), (humidity and dew point), (snow days)

== Demographics ==
=== Population ===
At the time of the 2006 National Census, the city's population was 48,901 in 12,220 households. The following census in 2011 counted 53,449 people in 15,021 households. The 2016 census measured the population of the city as 51,352 people in 15,762 households.

== Notable people ==
- Mohammad Nazar Azimi

== Bibliography ==
- Huff, D. (1987), "Architecture: Sasanian", Encyclopaedia Iranica, vol. 2, New York: Routledge & Kegan Paul, pp. 329–334
- Kawami, T. (1987), "Architecture: Seleucid", Encyclopaedia Iranica, vol. 2, New York: Routledge & Kegan Paul, pp. 326–327
- Keall, E. J. (1987), "Architecture: Parthian", Encyclopaedia Iranica, vol. 2, New York: Routledge & Kegan Paul, pp. 327–329
- Kleiss, Wolfram (2005), "Kangāvar", Encyclopaedia Iranica, vol. OT 7, Costa Mesa: Mazda
