= Qazvineh Rural District =

Rural district in Kermanshah province, Iran

Qazvineh Rural District Persian: دهستان قزوينه
- Rural District
- Location within Iran
- Coordinates: 34°30′58″N 47°49′27″E
- Country: Iran
- Province: Kermanshah
- County: Kangavar
- District: Central
- Capital: Qazvineh

Population (2016)
  - Total: 960
- Time zone: UTC+3:30 (IRST)

Qazvineh Rural District (Persian: دهستان قزوينه) is in the Central District of Kangavar County, Kermanshah province, Iran. Its capital is the village of Qazvineh.

== Demographics ==
=== Population ===
At the time of the 2006 National Census, the rural district's population was 1,500 in 386 households. There were 1,015 inhabitants in 300 households at the following census of 2011. The 2016 census measured the population of the rural district as 960 in 304 households. The most populous of its 16 villages was Qarah Guzlu-ye Sofla, with 386 people.
