= Kermajan Rural District =

Rural district in Kermanshah province, Iran

Kermajan Rural District Persian: دهستان كرماجان
- Rural District
- Location within Iran
- Coordinates: 34°27′19″N 47°54′34″E
- Country: Iran
- Province: Kermanshah
- County: Kangavar
- District: Central
- Capital: Kermajan

Population (2016)
  - Total: 3,596
- Time zone: UTC+3:30 (IRST)

Kermajan Rural District (Persian: دهستان كرماجان) is in the Central District of Kangavar County, Kermanshah province, Iran. Its capital is the village of Kermajan.

== Demographics ==
=== Population ===
At the time of the 2006 National Census, the rural district's population was 6,423 in 1,499 households. There were 3,985 inhabitants in 1,084 households at the following census of 2011. The 2016 census measured the population of the rural district as 3,596 in 1,080 households. The most populous of its 17 villages was Soltanabad, with 633 people.
