= Gowdin Rural District =

Rural district in Kermanshah province, Iran

Gowdin Rural District Persian: دهستان گودين
- Rural District
- Location within Iran
- Coordinates: 34°30′22″N 48°02′01″E
- Country: Iran
- Province: Kermanshah
- County: Kangavar
- District: Central
- Capital: Gowdin

Population (2016)
  - Total: 8,379
- Time zone: UTC+3:30 (IRST)

Gowdin Rural District (Persian: دهستان گودين) is in the Central District of Kangavar County, Kermanshah province, Iran. It is administered from the city of Gowdin.

== Demographics ==
=== Population ===
At the time of the 2006 National Census, the rural district's population was 12,797 in 3,207 households. There were 12,709 inhabitants in 3,660 households at the following census of 2011. The 2016 census measured the population of the rural district as 8,379 in 2,519 households. The most populous of its 27 villages was Qarleq-e Bozorg, with 2,000 people.
