= Fash Rural District =

Rural district in Kermanshah province, Iran

Fash Rural District Persian: دهستان فش
- Rural District
- Location within Iran
- Coordinates: 34°34′32″N 47°51′59″E
- Country: Iran
- Province: Kermanshah
- County: Kangavar
- District: Central
- Capital: Fash

Population (2016)
  - Total: 4,335
- Time zone: UTC+3:30 (IRST)

Fash Rural District (Persian: دهستان فش) is in the Central District of Kangavar County, Kermanshah province, Iran. Its capital is the village of Fash.

== Demographics ==
=== Population ===
At the time of the 2006 National Census, the rural district's population was 5,607 in 1,341 households. There were 4,931 inhabitants in 1,370 households at the following census of 2011. The 2016 census measured the population of the rural district as 4,335 in 1,316 households. The most populous of its 19 villages was Fash, with 1,545 people.
