= Khezel-e Gharbi Rural District =

Rural district in Kermanshah province, Iran

Khezel-e Gharbi Rural District Persian: دهستان خزل غربي
- Rural District
- Location within Iran
- Coordinates: 34°21′04″N 47°53′24″E
- Country: Iran
- Province: Kermanshah
- County: Kangavar
- District: Central
- Capital: Dehlor

Population (2016)
  - Total: 4,192
- Time zone: UTC+3:30 (IRST)

Khezel-e Gharbi Rural District (Persian: دهستان خزل غربي) is in the Central District of Kangavar County, Kermanshah province, Iran. Its capital is the village of Dehlor.

== Demographics ==
=== Population ===
At the time of the 2006 National Census, the rural district's population was 4,987 in 1,172 households. There were 4,756 inhabitants in 1,214 households at the following census of 2011. The 2016 census measured the population of the rural district as 4,192 in 1,255 households. The most populous of its 32 villages was Dehlor, with 1,023 people.
