= Central District (Kangavar County) =

District in Kermanshah province, Iran

Central District (Kangavar County) Persian: بخش مرکزی شهرستان کنگاور
- District
- Location within Iran
- Coordinates: 34°27′N 47°56′E
- Country: Iran
- Province: Kermanshah
- County: Kangavar
- Capital: Kangavar

Population (2016)
  - Total: 75,443
- Time zone: UTC+3:30 (IRST)

The Central District of Kangavar County (Persian: بخش مرکزی شهرستان کنگاور) is in Kermanshah province, Iran. Its capital is the city of Kangavar.

== History ==
After the 2006 National Census, the village of Gowdin was elevated to the status of a city.

== Demographics ==
=== Population ===
At the time of the 2006 census, the district's population was 80,215 in 19,825 households. The following census in 2011 counted 80,845 people in 22,649 households. The 2016 census measured the population of the district as 75,443 inhabitants in 23,071 households.

=== Administrative divisions ===
Central District (Kangavar County) Population
Administrative Divisions	2006	2011	2016
Fash RD	5,607	4,931	4,335
Gowdin RD	12,797	12,709	8,379
Kermajan RD	6,423	3,985	3,596
Khezel-e Gharbi RD	4,987	4,756	4,192
Qazvineh RD	1,500	1,015	960
Gowdin (city)			2,629
Kangavar (city)	48,901	53,449	51,352
Total	80,845	81,051	75,443
RD = Rural District
