= Kangavar County =

County in Kermanshah province, Iran

Kangavar County Persian: شهرستان کنگاور
- County
- Location of Kangavar County in Kermanshah province (right, pink)

- Location of Kermanshah province in Iran
- Coordinates: 34°27′N 47°56′E
- Country: Iran
- Province: Kermanshah
- Capital: Kangavar
- Districts: Central

Population (2016)
  - Total: 76,216
- Time zone: UTC+3:30 (IRST)

Kangavar County (Persian: شهرستان کنگاور) (Note: Also romanized as Šahrestâne Kangâvar) is in Kermanshah province, Iran. Its capital is the city of Kangavar.

== History ==
After the 2006 National Census, the village of Gowdin was elevated to the status of a city.

== Demographics ==
=== Population ===
At the time of the 2006 census, the county's population was 80,215 in 19,825 households. The following census in 2011 counted 81,051 people in 22,665 households. The 2016 census measured the population of the county as 76,216 in 23,253 households.

=== Administrative divisions ===
Kangavar County's population history and administrative structure over three consecutive censuses are shown in the following table.

Kangavar County Population
Administrative Divisions	2006	2011	2016
Central District	80,215	80,845	75,443
Fash RD	5,607	4,931	4,335
Gowdin RD	12,797	12,709	8,379
Kermajan RD	6,423	3,985	3,596
Khezel-e Gharbi RD	4,987	4,756	4,192
Qazvineh RD	1,500	1,015	960
Gowdin (city)			2,629
Kangavar (city)	48,901	53,449	51,352
Total	80,215	81,051	76,216
RD = Rural District

== See also ==
Media related to Kangavar County at Wikimedia Commons
