= Laks (Kurdistan) =

Kurdish tribe found in Iran

Lak
لەک / Lek
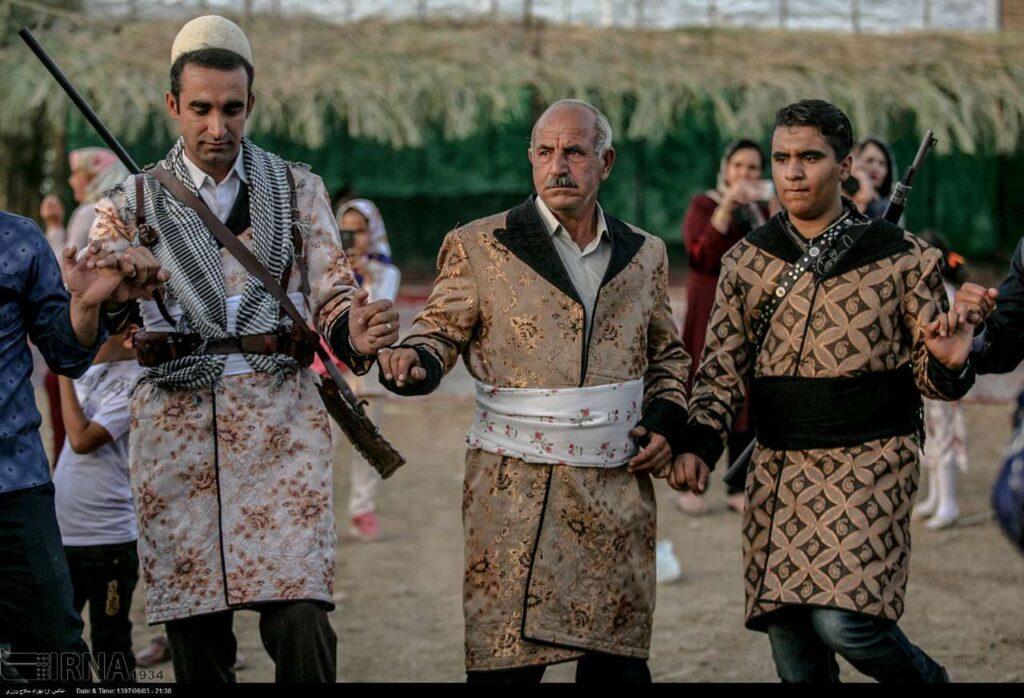
- Laks performing a traditional dance

Regions with significant populations
- Western Iran: 1,160,000 to 2,000,000

Languages
- Laki

Religion
- Majority: Islam (Shia majority, Sunni minority); Significant minority: Yarsanism

Lak (Kurdish: Lek ,لەک) is a Kurdish tribe native to Western Iran. They speak Laki, which is considered a Kurdish dialect by most linguists.

Laks inhabit a large part of Lorestan province where they constitute over 65% of the population and most of the eastern regions of the neighboring province of Kermanshah, some parts of western Ilam province (Poshte-Kuhi Laks), and around western Hamadan. The area to the east of Mount Kabir is known as Pishe-Kuh, and west of the mountain is known as Poshte-Kuh.

The majority of the Laks consider themselves followers of the Shia branch of Islam.

== Origins ==
Mohammad-Ali Emam-Shooshtari divided the Lurs into four groups, the Luristani, Bakhtiari, Kohgiluyeh, and the Lurs of Fars, adding that many Luristanis were of Lak origin, and that Laks were considered Kurds. Abdollah Shahbazi wrote that the tribes of Luristan comprised two groups, the Lur and Lak, which differed in language, culture, and some religious aspects, as the Laks were originally considered the southernmost group of Kurdish tribes, but intermingled and assimilated with the Lur tribes. Parviz Rajabi described the Laks as a branch of the Kurds but counted with the Lurs. Mohammad-Amin Riahi claimed the Laks had elements from Kurds and Lurs and were generally counted with either. Kamal Fuad wrote that the Lak tribes were of Kurdish origin but lived in the northern Luristan province and were therefore counted with the Lurs, who were ethnographically and linguistically distinct from Kurds. According to The Persian Encyclopedia, the Laks were a group of Kurdish tribes, and those in Luristan province resembled the Lurs but were not to be confused with them.

There was little linguistic information on Lurs and Kurds in general until the early 20th century, when Oskar Mann undertook a study visiting almost every tribe, and grouped the Laks with the Kurds, after which Karl Hadank and Vladimir Minorsky did the same. Minorsky described the Lak tribes as a Kurdish island in Luristan, which lived interspersed among the population of northern Luristan, and spoke a variety of Kurdish, distinct from the Luri dialects which were closer to Persian. He also described them as the southernmost group of Kurdish tribes, with origins from further north. Minorsky noted that the Kurdish Lak tribes of Tarhan, Delfan, Selseleh, and Beyranvand were only considered Lurs in an administrative sense. According to Jacob Black-Michaud, there was "considerable empirical support for the theory that Laki is a derivative of Kurdish and that present-day Laki-speakers are mostly descended from sixteenth- to seventeenth century Kurdish immigrants or conquerors from the north." D.N. MacKenzie, while careful to avoid using the term "Kurd" in the historically broader sense, specifically mentioned the Lak as Kurds. Jean-Pierre Digard, and Xavier de Planhol also described them as Kurds. Pierre Oberling included the Laki speaking tribes among the Kurdish tribes.

Modern scholarship generally considered the Laks as a Lur subgroup that was Kurdish in origin. The Cambridge History of Iran mentioned that the "northern Lur or Lak tribes" may have been immigrants of Kurdish origin, nevertheless distinct from the Feyli Lurs of Khorramabad. Kaveh Farrokh similarly wrote that the "Lak, or northern Lurs" were "most likely of Kurdish origin" and "distinct from Khorramabad's Faili Lurs." D. T. Potts noted that "the northern Lur tribes were collectively known as Lak and may have had Kurdish origins. They were, in any case, distinct from the 'Great Lur,' or Bakhtiyari, and the 'Little Lur,' or Feyli." John R. Perry described them as a branch of northern Lurs, perhaps of Kurdish origin, specifying that their language resembled Kurdish more than Luri, and that the Laks apparently immigrated to northern Luristan or were settled by Shah Abbas, and were mentioned alongside the Zands as Lurs by the later Safavid period. Garnik Asatrian wrote that "judging by their language, the Lak are most likely an offshoot of the Lurs with some Kurdish admixture." According to Marina Kunke, the Laks were likely of Kurdish descent, but were counted among the Lur tribes, with the Safavid document Tohfa-ye Shahi including the "Lak and Zand" as one of the four Lur divisions alongside the Feyli, Bakhtiari, and Mamasani. Gernot L Windfuhr wrote that "the Lori and South Kurdish Lakki tribes" comprised the population of Lorestan province. Richard N Frye considered the "Lakki dialects" as "south Kurdish dialects", suggesting that the "speakers of Lakki dialects in northern Luristan are probably relatively late intruders", whose Kurdicization process had slowly proceeded throughout the Islamic period. The Laks were also described as a southern Kurdish tribe by Roger Savory, Willem M Floor, and Heribert Busse.

According to Wilhelm Eilers, Iranian nomadic groups speaking southwestern dialects and northwestern dialects were classified as Lurs and Kurds respectively, and the "contact area of northwest and southwest dialects, precisely in northern Luristan" was inhabited by the Lak tribes who spoke "southern Kurdish dialects" and "still linguistically belonged to the north". Friedrich von Spiegel mentioned the Laks as Kurdish tribes who lived all around Iran and were headquartered in Qazvin, Fars, and Mazandaran, although Otto Günther von Wesendonk simply regarded the Lak tribes as "Kurds in Luristan". Jacques de Morgan had mentioned both the "Laki Kurds" and the "Feyli Lurs" during his trip to Luristan.

In "Mamassanī dar goḏargāh-e tārīḵ", a major study on southern Iran, Hasan Habibi Fahliyani wrote that the Qashqai included some Lak elements, who were of Kurdish origin but were settled in northern Lorestan by Shah Abbas and commonly mistaken for Lur tribes afterwards. According to Bahman Karimi, the Laks were not considered Kurds or Lurs but had emerged from an amalgamation of both. G. B. Akopov also believed that the Laks included both elements, adding that the question was not about whether they were Kurds or Lurs, but rather about clarifying the direction of their ethnic development. Akopov wrote that historical sources variously mentioned the Laks as being Kurds or Lurs, although it was evident in 19th-century sources that the Laks were clearly distinct from Lurs and were not shifting towards them. By the 20th century, the nationwide rise of Persian influence in Iran had affected both the Kurds and Lurs.

== Etymology ==
The name of the Laks was commonly believed to derive from "lak", a Persian word meaning "one hundred thousand", which was said to have been the original Lak population. It was also suggested that "Lak" emerged as an ethnic term emerged after a process of cultural and ethnological amalgamations between the migrant tribes and people of the region, and that the term was originally used to refer to certain nomadic tribes before developing into an ethnic term for a large population, both settled and nomadic. Scholars generally agreed that it derived from the Persian numeral for 100,000 used in the Safavid era, dismissing a prominent folk etymology among many Laks claiming that "Lak" (لک) was formed by the letter "L" (ل) representing Lurs and the letter "K" (ک) representing Kurds. Tribal names coming from numerals was a "widespread ancient and modern practice" in Iran. The term "Laklak", also attested in the names of some villages, was possibly a reduplication of "Lak".

It was also historically reported that the term "Lak" was used by Lurs to refer to Kurds. A. H. Schindler also claimed that Lurs used the term "Lak" for Kurds, adding that when the Lurs accepted Islam, the Laks did not, which sometimes caused the terms "Lak" and "Kurd" to be used derogatorily in Luristan for people who did not fulfill religious duties. Similarly, Albert Socin wrote that the Lurs stressed their differences from the Kurds, who they called "Lak". However, V. F. Dittel reported that "in Persia, numerous Kurdish tribes call themselves 'Laki'."

== History ==
The Laks were first mentioned in the Sharafnama alongside the Zands among the less prominent Kurdish tribes subject to Persia. Sharafkhan Bidlisi, who divided the Kurds into four groups, the Kurmanj, Kalhur, Guran, and Lur, included the Laks under the Kalhur category. According to Mustafa Dehqan, the Sharafnama linking the Laks to the Kurds of Iran rather than the Ottomans was significant, and chronicled the rise to dominance of both the Kurdish identity of the Laks, as well as their interest in Iranian culture and literature. However, Dehqan clarified that the first mention of the Laks, in the Sharafnama, was only minor, and that the first detailed mention of the Laks was in Bustan al-Siyaha of Zain al-Abidin Shirvani. He added that the Lak communities were probably settled in Luristan by Shah Abbas, and although they were largely unknown before the mention by Shirvani, several centers of intellectual life began to develop in their region by the late Afsharid period, which was important in that it gave rise to the Zand dynasty. According to Shirvani, the Laks comprised the tribes of Zand, Mafi, Bajalan, and Zandi-yi Kala, reportedly the tribe of Karim Khan Zand.

In Tarikh-e Alam-ara-ye Abbasi, by Iskandar Beg Munshi, there was a brief mention of the Laks of Salmas, led by Saru Khan Salmasi. The same Laks of Salmas were also mentioned in a work of Ali Naqi Nasiri. The Laks of Salmas were also categorized among the regional tribes without any affiliation to the Qizilbash in Tadhkirat al-Muluk. In addition to Tarikh-e Alam-ara-ye Abbasi and Tadhkirat al-Muluk, Mohammad-Amin Riahi provided several historical farmans of Safavid shahs which mentioned the Laks of Salmas. Despite having earlier survived many massacres and raids by the Ottomans, the Laks of Salmas disappeared during the Safavid period. The Laks of Salmas were increasingly persecuted after the death of Shah Ismail when Choqa Sultan Tekkelu won over Kopek Sultan Ustajlu and Div Sultan Rumlu. The Laks had been under the fiefdom of Kopek Sultan, and after he was killed, they were incorporated into the fiefdom of Choqa Sultan and there were massacres against the Laks, who were burnt alive in large groups. Three to four years later, Choqa Sultan was killed, although newer administrations continued to target the Laks. First, Shah Ismail had given a farman for the consolation of the Lak community, although the Qizilbash resurgence under Shah Tahmasp further harmed the Laks. Later, Shah Abbas came to power and issued the necessary farmans for the Laks of Salmas, although they were persecuted again under Shah Safi until Shah Abbas II issued another farman. While the Laks of Salmas disappeared, their leadership survived until the Qajar period, and their last leader was Ibrahim Khalil Khan, a descendant of Saru Khan Salmasi. According to Minorsky, the Laks of Salmas originated from southern Kurdistan and claimed to have migrated to Salmas from Isfahan. Riahi added that the Laks survived in Lorestan province and northwards. In the nearby region around Miandoab, locals continued using the term "Lak" for adherents of Yarsanism.

Before being settled in Luristan during the Safavid period, the Lak tribes of Selseleh were said to have previously lived near Mahidasht, while the Delfan were named after the Dulafid dynasty which historically ruled over their region, and the Bajalan of northern Luristan were the same as the Bajalan of Zohab, which claimed to come from Mosul, with the Luristan branch seemingly exchanging their Kurmanji for Laki during their sojourn with the Laks. The Lak tribes were also targeted in punitive campaigns by the Safavids and succeeding governments.

During the Zand period, the tribes of Lorestan were divided into two groups, the Laks, who were known as "the Vand tribes", and the Lurs, who were known as "the Feyli tribes" and were attached to the Vali dynasty. The Vali of Lorestan, Ismail Khan, who ruled over a large Lak population, feared becoming subordinate to Karim Khan Zand. Ismail Khan, who believed that only Alids should rule Iran, was alarmed by the rise of the Zands and mainly opposed them because they were local Laks of humble origin, whereas the Vali dynasty considered themselves superior as they claimed descent from Abbas ibn Ali and were installed by the Safavids. Ismail Khan regarded submission to Karim Khan Zand as dishonorable, emphasizing his Alid ancestry and uniting the Feyli Lur tribes around his cause, creating difficulties for the Zand dynasty. Some tribes in Lorestan, which were mistreated by Ismail Khan, or had family ties to the Zands, supported the Zands, although they were few and were under severe pressure from Ismail Khan and his allied tribes.

In Lorestan, the main supporters of Karim Khan Zand were the Beyranvand tribe, whereas the Feyli Lur tribes supported Ismail Khan against him. After the death of Karim Khan Zand, relations between the Vali dynasty and the Zands improved. However, towards the end of the Zand dynasty, their old enmity resurfaced, and the Vali dynasty helped the Qajars during their rise to power. In Shiraz, Karim Khan had called for the Lak tribe of Beyranvand. In 1797, the Beyranvand and Bajalan actively supported Mohammad Khan Zand against the Qajars. Under the Qajars, many Lak tribes were divided, and the Zand tribe suffered extensively and almost disappeared. During the rise of Agha Mohammad Khan Qajar, the Vali dynasty under Ismail Khan allied with the Qajars. Hasan Khan, the successor of Ismail Khan, maintained the alliance and had even handed over Mohammad Khan Zand to the Qajars. However, the initial good relations between the Vali dynasty and the Qajars, which were based on their shared enmity for the Zands, had soon deteriorated, and the Qajars even seized Lorestan (Pish-e-Kuh), although the Vali dynasty did not cause problems for the Qajars afterwards and remained cooperative.

When the Qajars came to power, Ismail Khan persecuted several tribes, including the Laks of Delfan, causing many of them to flee to Kermanshah. The Lak tribes of Hasanvand and Beyranvand, despite being counted among the Feyli tribes, had earlier supported the Zands, and having lost their privileges under the Qajars, began revolting and became the most troublesome tribes in Lorestan for the government. After Mohammad Khan, the last son of Ismail Khan, was killed by the Laks of Selseleh, Ismail Khan ordered his successor Hasan Khan to take revenge, and many of the Selseleh were killed. Later, Hasan Khan, as the Vali of Posht-e-Kuh, was invited to Lorestan by the Qajars to help suppress the revolt of his cousin Huseynqoli Khan, and he took the opportunity to devastate the Beyranvand tribe. His successor, Abbasqoli Khan, in one incident offered twenty horsemen to help the Qajar prince suppress the rebellious Delfan tribes who had advanced toward Posht-e-Kuh. When Reza Shah came to power, during his campaign against the tribes of Lorestan, the Beyranvand tribe reportedly did most of the fighting, while the Selseleh tribe was also among the rebellious tribes.

The geographical territory of the Laks was sometimes called Lakestan. The main Lak region included the southern and western parts of Hamadan, eastern parts of Kermanshah, western and northern parts of Lorestan, and eastern parts of Ilam. However, the Laks also lived in the wider region stretching from the city of Hamadan to the north of Khuzestan province to the city of Shahr-e Kord. The Lak region was previously part of the historical Iranian province officially known as "the fifth province" (ostan-e panjom), with the city of Kermanshah as its provincial capital.

Some Laks also lived near Esfandabad and Leylakh near Sanandaj in Kurdistan, and there were other exclaves of Laks further in areas such as Qazvin, Hashtgerd, Damavand, Kerman, and in the Caspian regions such as Manjil in Gilan and Kelardasht in Mazandaran, Salmas in West Azerbaijan, as well as in Dargaz and Kalat in Razavi Khorasan. Some Lak exclaves continued to speak Laki while others were linguistically assimilated. After the fall of the Zand dynasty, many of their supporters in central Iran were absorbed by greater nomadic confederations. The Laks were mainly absorbed into the Qashqai confederation, although some Laks were absorbed by the Bakhtiari or Boyer Ahmadi tribes. Rahimi Othmani noted thirteen Qashqai tribes of Lak origin. There were also said to be Lak communities in Iraq, as well as in Turkey around Adıyaman and between Adana and Central Anatolia, who adopted the local northern Kurdish dialects, or different languages altogether. In the 1840s, there were upwards of 3,000 Lak families in villages around Kirkuk, where they had adopted the local Kurdish dialect and Sunni Islam, while some Lak tribes lived in Zohab and "in great numbers" in Iran. The Laks were noted as a tribe divided between Ottoman and Persian authority. Historically, their Kurdish affiliation did not matter, as it was Sunni and Shia affiliation which determined Ottoman or Persian subjection respectively. Other Laks living among the Kurdish tribes of the Erbil plains were also Sunni.

The Laks were considered a Kurdish tribe on the census in Ottoman Iraq, and after the establishment of the Iraqi state. The Laks in the Ottoman Empire were considered Kurds who historically came from Iran, and in Turkish they were called "Lek Kürtleri", and historically "Ekrad-ı Lek", or "Lek Ekradi". The Laks were also said to be Kurdish migrants into Turkey from Khorasan. Another tribal document mentioned the "Lak" or "Lek" tribe, which lived in "Karaman, Konya, Sultanönü (Eskişehir), Niğde, Kayseriyye, Zamantı (Meraş), Harmancık (Kayserriyye), Çorum, Kırşehir, and Çukurova. From the nomadic Kurdish tribes." While tribes were largely autonomous in the first century of Ottoman rule, a qadi was later appointed to the Lek (Lekwan) Kurds, Reşwan Kurds, as well as Bozulus Turkmen. Meanwhile, the Lekvanik tribe were known for brigandage, and made alliances with other Kurdish tribes to organize robberies. At the end of the 17th century, the Laks joined the Yazidis and several Kurdish tribes in Elbistan in a revolt against the Ottomans.

The most distinguished point in the history of the Laks was the rise of Karim Khan Zand. Two revolutionary leaders later of emerged from among the Laks, namely Yar-Mohammad Khan Kermanshahi, who fought alongside the Constitutionalists in Tabriz and was killed in battle against Qajar prince Farmanfarma in Kermanshah in October 1912, and Khalu Qorban Harsini, the commander of partisan units of Mirza Kuchik Khan in the Jangali movement before the rise of the Pahlavi dynasty in 1920.

Minorsky noted the cohesion of the Lak tribes before 1914, adding that the tribes of Delfan, Selseleh, and Tarhan were united under Nazar Ali Khan of the Amra'i clan. Minorsky also claimed that they additionally had religious solidarity, as all of the Delfan and many Amala of Tarhan were Yarsani. Minorsky claimed that the majority of Laks were Yarsani. Most Laks were Shia Muslims by the 21st century. A considerable amount of Laks remained Yarsani, mainly around Sahneh and Nurabad. There were also Bible translations into Laki by the 21st century. In addition to Laki, there were some Laks who adopted neighboring dialects of Kurdish, Luri, and Gorani. Many Lak tribes of Posht-e-Kuh traditionally spoke the local Southern Kurdish dialect and not Laki.

== Self-identification ==
Faramarz Shahsavari noted that the "dispute" initiated by Erik John Anonby regarding the ethnic affiliation and language origin of the Lak was "still unresolved" and complex. In 2004, Anonby compared the works of regional scholars Fattah, Amanollahi, and Izadpanah, and wrote that Fattah gave a detailed overview but claimed he was politically motivated in considering them Kurds, and also noted that while Fattah defended their Kurdish identity and believed there were deliberate efforts to distance them from Kurds, he acknowledged that the efforts had some affect on the identification of Laks. Anonby added that Amanollahi and Izadpanah gave the primary ethnic identity of Laki-speakers as neither Lak nor Kurdish, but rather Lur, considering Laki as a uniquely linguistic term while Luri was both ethnic and linguistic. Anonby agreed with their view on the identity of Laks in Pish-e-Kuh, but admitted that it had been generalized to include the more complex Laks of Posht-e Kuh. Anonby also pointed out that Fattah had more information on Posht-e-Kuh. However, Ludwig Paul reviewed the work of Fattah in 2006, and wrote that he discussed "controversial affiliation of the Lak with the (Southern) Kurds in a balanced and nuanced manner" and avoided "Kurdish maximalism", adding that the Lak were considered a "distinct subgroup" of Kurds according to "their own self-understanding", whereas the Lurs did not identify as Kurds but nevertheless had kinship ties with them.

Hamzeh'ee, a Yarsani scholar and a native of Harsin, described them as "Laki Kurds", and had earlier wrote that that some scholars did not recognize a clear line between Laks and Lurs, such as Izadpanah who claimed both were simply Lur, to which Hamzeh'ee replied that while the Laks and Lurs were similar in many aspects of life, the same could be said for the population around Kermanshah and Lorestan as a whole, and that it was already known that Laki and Luri linguistically belonged to different Iranian branches. Ali Ahmad Saki, a Lur scholar, wrote that the tribes of Luristan belonged to two groups of different origin, including the Lak tribes such as Beyranvand who were of Kurdish origin, and the Lur tribes such as Mir, Sagvand, Qaedvand, and Chegeni who had their own culture and more resembled the Bakhtiaris further south while also having historically absorbed Arab and Turkic elements.

Anonby noted that the Laks were not a homogenous people, and were traditionally divided into two main groups, the Laks of Pish-e-Kuh (Lorestan province) and the Laks of Posht-e-Kuh (Kermanshah and Ilam provinces and adjacent parts of Iraq), and that they were mainly linked by the Laki language but were otherwise relatively independent of each other. He added that it was difficult to simply identify the Lak tribes due to their affiliation with Kurds or Lurs, and that this later caused debates over whether the Lak ethnicity existed in the first place. He added that most Laks of Pish-e-Kuh identified firmly as Lurs, while the Laks of Posht-e-Kuh showed strong ties to both Kurds and Lurs. Anonby wrote that the Laks in Iran had always been divided between identifying as Kurds, as Lurs, or as a distinct group related to both, and added that most Laks in Lorestan province were increasingly identifying with the Lurs at the start of the 21st century, and linked the tendency to the fact that the main corpus of the Laks, in Lorestan province, were historically subjected to Lur rulers such as the Vali dynasty, who ruled both Lorestan and Ilam provinces. Belelli also noted the same pattern of self-identification as Anonby did, adding that regardless of what they identified as, the Laks were aware of having an intermediate position between Kurds and Lurs, whether ethnic, linguistic, cultural, or geographic, and that self-identification even shifted according to circumstances. Others also noted the self-identifications (Kurdish, Lur, Lak) varied depending on circumstances. They had also been described as a Kurdish group with affiliations to both Kurds and Lurs. Erhard Franz wrote that some Laki speakers, such as the Kalhor and Kolya'i tribes, were consistently classified as Kurds, and others consistently as Lurs. An Iranian study in 2022 noted that the Laks in Lorestan and Hamadan provinces were counted as Lurs, while those in Kermanshah and Ilam provinces were counted as Kurds. According to Mehrdad Izady, the Laks were Kurds increasingly assimilating among the Lurs, and the "phenomenon" was most evident among the educated and urban population, whereas in the countryside, the Laks adjacent to Kurds primarily identified as Kurds, and those adjacent to Lurs primarily identified as Lurs or simply as Laks.

When Patty Jo Watson conducted field work in Hasanabad (a village on the Qarasu River in Kermanshah province) from 1959 to 1960, she wrote that the region known as "Lakistan" had both Kurdish and Lur elements, although the local Laks identified themselves and their language as Kurdish. Black-Michaud wrote that the Laki and Luri speakers, "in most cases, both describe themselves and each other as Lurs." However, he added that the Lur identity was not a linguistic distinction but was mainly defined by living in the Luristan province and being distinct from the neighboring Arabs and Persians. In addition to Luri speakers, he noted that Luristan also included Laki speakers in the north and Kurdish speakers around Kabir Kouh who also described themselves as Lurs to Persians and other outsiders. According to Rüdiger Schmitt, the Laks spoke a "SE Kurdish dialect" but "strongly identify themselves as Lurs, a more prestigious SW Perside tribe adjacent to them, even though Lurs are low themselves on the prestige scale." Lois Beck, discussing Iranian ethnic and tribal groups, wrote that "the labels used for and by these groups represent political statements; a given name does not necessarily describe the language, cultural identity, or actual origin of all or some of the people included. For example, members of Lur tribes on the southeastern border of Kurdistan who spoke Laki considered themselves to be Kurds." Similarly, according to Martin van Bruinessen, the Lurs did not identify as Kurds, and "only those Lur tribes that speak the Leki dialect and generally consider themselves Kurds" could be included within the Kurdish boundary. He later again clarified that the Lurs who identified with the Kurds were generally Laki speakers.

Anonby added that many Laks in Lorestan province considered Luristani Luri as more valuable than Laki, and adopted the Luri language to "get ahead", abandoning the Laki language as it was associated with cultural conservativism, rurality and economic deprivation, despite Luri also facing pressure and shifting towards Persian. Outside of Lorestan, the village of Chashin in Hamadan was made up of Laks who followed Yarsanism, with a population of 1,400 in 2015, and surrounded by villages which spoke Persian, Azerbaijani, and Luri. The Laks of Chashin identified either as Lak Kurds or as Laks altogether, and had explicitly distinguished themselves from the residents of the nearby village of Khaku because they spoke northern Luri. Later in 2026, Reza Talebi noted that Kurdish identification among the Laks had strengthened in response to government repression.

== Tribes ==
Minorsky mentioned the lists of Lak tribes in Lorestan gathered by Oskar Mann and Rabino, which included the Delfan, Selseleh, and the Amra'i clan of the Tarhan (or Tarkhan). The Beyranvand and Dalvand tribes, which were claimed to be part of the tribes of Bala Gariva, were also considered Lak. The Beyranvand were historically distinguished as the only Laki speakers in the Bala Gariva confederation, which spoke Luri. The tribes of Tarhan included both Luri and Laki speakers. According to Iranica, the Delfan, including Kakavand, Bijanvand, Ivatvand, spoke Laki, and the tribes of Tarhan comprised the Luri speaking tribes of Suri, Amrayi, Alivand, Khoshnamvand, Garma'i, and Shiravand, as well as the Laki speaking tribes of Garavand, Adinavand, Kunani, Azadbakht, and Owlad-e Qobad, among others, while the Selseleh, including the Hasanvand, Yusofvand, Kowlivand, spoke Laki.

Minorsky also mentioned a list compiled by J. L. Rousseau at Kermanshah in 1807, listing the local Lak tribes as Kalhor, Mafi, Nanaki, Jalilvand, Payravand, Kolya'i, Sufivand, Bahramvand, Karkuki, Tawali, Zuyirvand, Kakuvand, Namivand, Ahmadvand, Bohtu'i, Zuliya, Harsini, and Shaykhvand. The Kalhor, Mafi, Sufivand, Karkuki, Jalilvand, and Kolya'i tribes mentioned in the list were also considered Kurdish. Rousseau claimed that the term Lak was a general label applied to the tribes around the southeast of Kermanshah. Other lists also included the Bajalan and Zangana tribes as Lak.

Abbas al-Azzawi considered the Laks in Iraq as a Kurdish tribal confederation comprising the Zargush, Suramiri, Rojbayani, Lak (a small tribe in Erbil), and Sheikhbizin tribes. In Turkey, the Lekvanik around Çukurova, the Sheikhbizin around Haymana, and the Bermeki around Bingöl, were considered "Lak Kurds". The "Lak Colonies" were also described as a "Kurdish group that migrated westward in the eleventh century."

== Notable Lak people ==
- Karim Khan Zand
- Alireza Beiranvand
