= Zardeh =

Zardeh (Persian: زرده), also known as Zarde and Razdeh, may refer to various places in Iran:

- Zardeh, Dalahu, Kermanshah Province
- Zardeh, Kangavar, Kermanshah Province
- Zardeh-ye Seyyed Mohammad, Kermanshah Province
- Zardeh, Zanjan
- Zardeh Savar (disambiguation)
- Zerde, a pudding, sometimes spelled زرده
