= Hasanvand =

Tribe in Iran

Hasanvand (also spelled Hasanavand and Hasanwand) is a Lak tribe mainly settled in the Lorestan province of Iran.

== History ==
The Hasanvand were traditionally centered around Aleshtar and they were considered one of the three main tribes of Selseleh, and they spoke Laki and followed Shia Islam. Their name was derived from their ancestor Hasan. They did not appear in the list of Lur tribes of Hamdallah Mustawfi, and they first appeared during the Qajar period.

According to writings during the rule of Fath-Ali Shah Qajar, the Hasanvand were one of the main clans of Lorestan. They participated in small feuds between the Qajar provincial governments of Lorestan and Kermanshah. There was no information about their activities during the rule of Mohammad Shah Qajar. Their historical presence increased during the chaos under the rule of Naser al-Din Shah.

The Hasanvand tribe, led by Musa Khan Hasanvand, joined a tribal alliance also including the tribes of Delfan and Bala Gariva against Khanlar Mirza, which was defeated by the Qajars under Yildirim Mirza around 1852. Zil al-Sultan killed and exiled many Hasanvand leaders around 1880. The Hasanvand had a rivalry with the tribes of Tarhan over the governance of Lorestan, which lasted until 1918-1919, when the Hasanvand allied with the Kakavand and defeated the Tarhan, gaining relative independence.

After the Pahlavi period, many of them abandoned nomadism and settled in the cities of Aleshtar and Khorramabad. A. T. Wilson estimated the Hasanvand at around three thousand families at the beginning of the 20th century, also including the "dependent tribes" of Khamseh, Dowlatshah, Zohabi, Gorja'i, Salar, Baba Sanim, Mohammad Reza, Bastam, Kakolvand, Rahmanshah, Fawlad, Javanmard, Huz Abdol Ali, and Huz Khoda'i. H. L. Rabino estimated them at around four thousand families, noting that the Hasanvand had also absorbed the Amirvand tribe. In the 1930s, they were estimated at around five thousand families, while in the 1960s it was reduced to 1,500 families mostly farming and scattered over a large area north of Khorramabad including the districts of Hasanvand, Honam-Bastam, (both in Selseleh County), Rimaleh, and Dehpir. According to a 2008 census from the Statistical Center of Iran, the Hasanvand comprised 1,121 households in their summer pasture in Lorestan.

== Sources ==
- Dalvand, Hamidreza (2022). "Ḥasanwand". In Madelung, Wilferd; Daftary, Farhad (eds.). Encyclopaedia Islamica Online. Brill Online. ISSN 1875-9831.
- Oberling, Pierre (2003). "Ḥasanvand". In Yarshater, Ehsan (ed.). Encyclopædia Iranica. Vol. XII/1: Harem I–Hedāyat al-mota'allemin. London and New York: Routledge & Kegan Paul. pp. 46–47. ISBN 978-0-933273-74-0.
