= Emamzadeh Mohammad =

Emamzadeh Mohammad (Persian: امامزاده محمد) may refer to:

- Emamzadeh Seyyed Mohammad, Chaharmahal and Bakhtiari
- Emamzadeh Mohammad Rural District, an administrative division of Kazerun County, Fars province
- Emamzadeh Mohammad, Khuzestan
- Emamzadeh Mohammad, Qazvin
