= Vileh =

Vileh or Veyleh or Vaileh or Vayleh (Persian: ويله) may refer to:

- Vileh, Ilam
- Veyleh, Dalahu, Kermanshah Province
- Veyleh, Gahvareh, Dalahu County, Kermanshah Province
- Vileh, Kurdistan
