= Seyyed Mohammad =

Seyyed Mohammad (Persian: سيدمحمد) may refer to:

- Seyyed Mohammad, Chaharmahal and Bakhtiari
- Seyyed Mohammad, Fars
- Seyyed Mohammad, Kermanshah
- Seyyed Mohammad, Zanjan
