= Zhalekeh-ye Hoseyn =

Zhalekeh-ye Hoseyn ژالكه حسين
- Village
- Location within Iran
- Coordinates: 34°29′22″N 45°57′40″E
- Country: Iran
- Province: Kermanshah
- County: Dalahu
- Bakhsh: Central
- Rural District: Ban Zardeh

Population (2006)
  - Total: 179
- Time zone: UTC+3:30 (IRST)
  - Summer (DST): UTC+4:30 (IRDT)

Zhalekeh-ye Hoseyn (Persian: ژالكه حسين, also Romanized as Zhālekeh-ye Ḩoseyn; also known as Zhālegeh) is a village in Ban Zardeh Rural District, in the Central District of Dalahu County, Kermanshah Province, Iran. At the 2006 census, its population was 179, in 41 families.
