= Harir, Iran =

Harir حرير
- Village
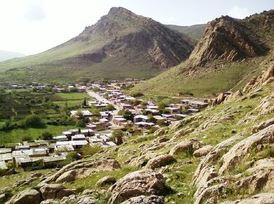

- Location within Iran
- Coordinates: 34°18′39″N 46°12′01″E
- Country: Iran
- Province: Kermanshah
- County: Dalahu
- Bakhsh: Central
- Rural District: Howmeh-ye Kerend

Population (2006)
  - Total: 931
- Time zone: UTC+3:30 (IRST)
  - Summer (DST): UTC+4:30 (IRDT)

Harir (Persian: حرير; Kurdish: ھەریر, romanized: Harîr) is a village in Howmeh-ye Kerend Rural District, in the Central District of Dalahu County, Kermanshah Province, Iran. At the 2006 census, its population was 931, in 241 families.
