= Var Gonbad =

Var Gonbad ورگنبد
- Village
- Location within Iran
- Coordinates: 34°19′08″N 46°10′22″E
- Country: Iran
- Province: Kermanshah
- County: Dalahu
- Bakhsh: Central
- Rural District: Howmeh-ye Kerend

Population (2006)
  - Total: 63
- Time zone: UTC+3:30 (IRST)
  - Summer (DST): UTC+4:30 (IRDT)

Var Gonbad (Persian: ورگنبد; also known as Shahīd Ḩayātī) is a village in Howmeh-ye Kerend Rural District, in the Central District of Dalahu County, Kermanshah Province, Iran. At the 2006 census, its population was 63, in 14 families.
