= Hesil Qanbareh =

Hesil Qanbareh حصيل قنبره
- Village
- Country: Iran
- Province: Kermanshah
- County: Dalahu
- Bakhsh: Central
- Rural District: Howmeh-ye Kerend

Population (2006)
  - Total: 23
- Time zone: UTC+3:30 (IRST)
  - Summer (DST): UTC+4:30 (IRDT)

Hesil Qanbareh (Persian: حصيل قنبره, also Romanized as Ḩeṣīl Qanbareh) is a village in Howmeh-ye Kerend Rural District, in the Central District of Dalahu County, Kermanshah Province, Iran. At the 2006 census, its population was 23, in 4 families.
