= Halateh =

Halateh هلته
- Village
- Location within Iran
- Coordinates: 34°19′54″N 46°09′37″E
- Country: Iran
- Province: Kermanshah
- County: Dalahu
- Bakhsh: Central
- Rural District: Howmeh-ye Kerend

Population (2006)
  - Total: 159
- Time zone: UTC+3:30 (IRST)
  - Summer (DST): UTC+4:30 (IRDT)

Halateh (Persian: هلته, also Romanized as Halāteh) is a village in Howmeh-ye Kerend Rural District, in the Central District of Dalahu County, Kermanshah Province, Iran. At the 2006 census, its population was 159, in 45 families.
