= Banmazaran =

Neighborhood in Kermanshah province, Iran

Banmazaran Persian: بان مزاران
- Neighborhood
- Location within Iran
- Coordinates: 34°28′15″N 45°58′49″E
- Country: Iran
- Province: Kermanshah
- County: Dalahu
- District: Central
- City: Rizhaw

Population (2011)
  - Total: 1,647
- Time zone: UTC+3:30 (IRST)

Banmazaran (Persian: بان مزاران) (Note: Also romanized as Bānmazārān) is a neighborhood in the city of Rizhaw in the Central District of Dalahu County, Kermanshah province, Iran.

== Demographics ==
=== Population ===
At the time of the 2006 National Census, Banmazaran's population was 1,508 in 351 households, when it was a village in Ban Zardeh Rural District. The following census in 2011 counted 1,647 people in 442 households.

In 2013, the village of Shahrak-e Rijab merged with the villages of Baba Jani-ye Abd ol Mohammad, Baba Jani-ye Shah Morad, Banmazaran, Darabi, and Shalan to become the city of Rizhaw.
