= Sheykh Hasan =

Sheykh Hasan or Shaikh Hasan or Sheikh Hasan (Persian: شيخ حسن) may refer to:

- Sheykh Hasan, Alborz
- Sheykh Hasan, East Azerbaijan
- Sheykh Hasan, Kermanshah
- Sheykh Hasan, Sarpol-e Zahab, Kermanshah Province
- Sheykh Hasan, Khuzestan
