= Baba Jani-ye Abd ol Mohammad =

Neighborhood in Kermanshah province, Iran

Baba Jani-ye Abd ol Mohammad Persian: باباجاني عبدالمحمد
- Neighborhood
- Location within Iran
- Coordinates: 34°28′36″N 45°58′30″E
- Country: Iran
- Province: Kermanshah
- County: Dalahu
- District: Central
- City: Rizhaw

Population (2011)
  - Total: 645
- Time zone: UTC+3:30 (IRST)

Baba Jani-ye Abd ol Mohammad (Persian: باباجاني عبدالمحمد) (Note: Also romanized as Bābā Jānī-ye ‘Abd ol Moḩammad; also known as Bābā Jānī and Bābā Jānī-ye Abū Dajāneh) is a neighborhood in the city of Rizhaw in the Central District of Dalahu County, Kermanshah province, Iran.

== Demographics ==
=== Population ===
At the time of the 2006 National Census, Baba Jani-ye Abd ol Mohammad's population was 624 in 144 households, when it was a village in Ban Zardeh Rural District. The following census in 2011 counted 645 people in 170 households.

In 2013, the village of Shahrak-e Rijab merged with the villages of Baba Jani-ye Abd ol Mohammad, Baba Jani-ye Shah Morad, Banmazaran, Darabi, and Shalan to become the city of Rizhaw.
