= Gavdaneh Khvor =

Gavdaneh Khvor گاودانه خور
- Village
- Location within Iran
- Coordinates: 34°13′27″N 46°15′30″E
- Country: Iran
- Province: Kermanshah
- County: Dalahu
- Bakhsh: Central
- Rural District: Howmeh-ye Kerend

Population (2006)
  - Total: 540
- Time zone: UTC+3:30 (IRST)
  - Summer (DST): UTC+4:30 (IRDT)

Gavdaneh Khvor (Persian: گاودانه خور, also Romanized as Gāvdāneh Khvor and Gāvdāneh Khvār) is a village in Howmeh-ye Kerend Rural District, in the Central District of Dalahu County, Kermanshah Province, Iran. At the 2006 census, its population was 540, in 111 families.
