= Biameh =

Biameh بيامه
- Village
- Location within Iran
- Coordinates: 34°23′34″N 46°10′43″E
- Country: Iran
- Province: Kermanshah
- County: Dalahu
- Bakhsh: Central
- Rural District: Bivanij

Population (2006)
  - Total: 16
- Time zone: UTC+3:30 (IRST)
  - Summer (DST): UTC+4:30 (IRDT)

Biameh (Persian: بيامه, also Romanized as Bīāmeh and Bayāmeh) is a village in Bivanij Rural District, in the Central District of Dalahu County, Kermanshah Province, Iran. At the 2006 census, its population was 16, in 4 families.
