= Shalan =

Shalan (Persian: شالان or شلان) may refer to:

- Shalan, Kermanshah (شلان - Shalān)
- Shalan, Dalahu (شالان - Shālān), Kermanshah Province
- shalan joudry, Canadian writer
