= Sorkheh Dizeh =

Sorkheh Dizeh سرخه ديزه
- Village
- Location within Iran
- Coordinates: 34°23′59″N 46°02′52″E
- Country: Iran
- Province: Kermanshah
- County: Dalahu
- Bakhsh: Central
- Rural District: Howmeh-ye Kerend

Population (2006)
  - Total: 300
- Time zone: UTC+3:30 (IRST)
  - Summer (DST): UTC+4:30 (IRDT)

Sorkheh Dizeh (Persian: سرخه ديزه, also Romanized as Sorkheh Dīzeh; also known as Mīān Tāk, Sorkh Dīzeh, Sorkheh Dīz, Sūrkha Dīz, and Sūrkhedīzeh) is a village in Howmeh-ye Kerend Rural District, in the Central District of Dalahu County, Kermanshah Province, Iran. At the 2006 census, its population was 300, in 66 families.
