= Kushkari, Dalahu County =

Kushkari كوشكري
- Village
- Country: Iran
- Province: Kermanshah
- County: Dalahu
- Bakhsh: Central
- Rural District: Ban Zardeh

Population (2006)
  - Total: 507
- Time zone: UTC+3:30 (IRST)
  - Summer (DST): UTC+4:30 (IRDT)

Kushkari (Persian: كوشكري, also Romanized as Kūshkarī) is a village in Ban Zardeh Rural District, in the Central District of Dalahu County, Kermanshah Province, Iran. At the 2006 census, its population was 507, in 104 families.
