= Hukani =

Hukani (Persian: هوكاني), also known as Hukani-ye Sabzeh, may refer to:

- Hukani-ye Olya
- Hukani-ye Sofla
