= Telesm =

Village in Kermanshah province, Iran

Telesm Persian: طلسم
- Village
- Location within Iran
- Coordinates: 34°12′45″N 46°16′47″E
- Country: Iran
- Province: Kermanshah
- County: Dalahu
- District: Central
- Rural District: Howmeh-ye Kerend

Population (2016)
  - Total: 188
- Time zone: UTC+3:30 (IRST)

Telesm (Persian: طلسم) (Note: Also romanized as Ţelesm) is a village in, and the capital of, Howmeh-ye Kerend Rural District of the Central District of Dalahu County, Kermanshah province, Iran.

== Demographics ==
=== Population ===
At the time of the 2006 National Census, the village's population was 428 in 99 households. The following census in 2011 counted 277 people in 70 households. The 2016 census measured the population of the village as 188 people in 53 households.
