= Deh-e Jami =

Village in Kermanshah province, Iran

Deh-e Jami Persian: ده جامی
- Village
- Location within Iran
- Coordinates: 34°23′19″N 46°14′16″E
- Country: Iran
- Province: Kermanshah
- County: Dalahu
- District: Central
- Rural District: Bivanij

Population (2016)
  - Total: 209
- Time zone: UTC+3:30 (IRST)

Deh-e Jami (Persian: ده جامی) (Note: Also romanized as Deh Jāmī, Deh-e Jāmī, and Deh-ī-Jāmī; also known as Dīh-ī-Jāmī) is a village in, and the capital of, Bivanij Rural District of the Central District of Dalahu County, Kermanshah province, Iran.

== Demographics ==
=== Population ===
At the time of the 2006 National Census, the village's population was 293 in 71 households. The following census in 2011 counted 224 people in 59 households. The 2016 census measured the population of the village as 209 people in 58 households. It was the most populous village in its rural district.
