= Hukani-ye Olya =

Hukani-ye Olya هوكاني عليا
- Village
- Location within Iran
- Coordinates: 34°09′17″N 46°14′31″E
- Country: Iran
- Province: Kermanshah
- County: Dalahu
- Bakhsh: Central
- Rural District: Howmeh-ye Kerend

Population (2006)
  - Total: 124
- Time zone: UTC+3:30 (IRST)
  - Summer (DST): UTC+4:30 (IRDT)

Hukani-ye Olya (Persian: هوكاني عليا, also Romanized as Hūkānī-ye ‘Olyā; also known as Hawa Kanī, Hūkānī, and Hūkānī-ye Sabzeh ‘Olyā) is a village in Howmeh-ye Kerend Rural District, in the Central District of Dalahu County, Kermanshah Province, Iran. At the 2006 census, its population was 124, in 24 families.
