= Delfan (tribe) =

Group of tribes in northern Lorestan

The Delfan (Persian: دلفان) are a collection of tribes living mainly in western Iran. They mostly live around the region of Delfan in northern Luristan, but are also dispersed in other regions. They speak Laki and follow Shia Islam and Yarsanism.

== History ==
The tribes of Delfan were one of the main Lak subgroups, and traditionally spoke Laki and lived in the Delfan region in northern Lorestan province, which was often said to be named after Abu Dulaf al-Ijli and the Dulafid dynasty who historically ruled the region. Some suggested that the tribes of Delfan were named after their ancestor, while others claimed it came from "del-e fâni" (دل فانی) meaning "mortal heart" and linked it to their religion of Yarsanism.

Minorsky listed the main groups of Lur as the Tarhan, Delfan, Selseleh, and Bala Gariva, adding that the first three were Lak while the last was truly Lur. As the Delfan and Selseleh were the two main Lak subgroups, sometimes the names and number of tribes in each group historically varied or overlapped. Minorsky added that the tribes of Delfan were entirely Yarsani and their population was estimated at 7,470 families by Oskar Mann and Rabino. Most of the Delfan tribes became Shia Muslim afterwards.

The tribes of Delfan were listed as Kakavand, Itivand (Ivatvand), Balavand, Bijanvand, Owlad-e Qobad, Mirbeg, Mumavand, Mal Muma, Nur Ali, Musavand, Karam Ali, Qala'i, Falak-al-Din, Sanjabi, Khair Ghulam, Chavari, Basharamad, Bavari, Padirvand, Ghayb Ghulab, Tajoddinvand, and Barikvand.

Minorsky added that the Delfan were the most important Yarsani tribe in Northern Luristan, and Yarsani saint Khan Atash was from the tribe. He added that some historically Gurani-speaking communities later assimilated into the Delfan which spoke Laki. According to the Kalâm-e Saranjâm, Shah Kushin had marched against Baba Bozorg, a pretender who challenged his authority, and later Baba Bozorg offered him two boys as a sign of his submission, with the two boys becoming the ancestors of the Delfan tribes. The Delfan tribes were also dispersed as far as Mazandaran. In 1891, Agha Sam of the Delfan tribe led a revolt in Kelardasht.
