= Holeylan and Zardalan =

Historical Kurdish and Luri tribal collection

The Holeylan and Zardalan were a historical collection of tribes living in the regions around Holeylan and Zardalan in western Iran. The regions of Holeylan and Zardalan later became part of Ilam province. The tribes spoke Kurdish and Luri and mainly followed Shia Islam.

== History ==
Historically, the Kurdish and Luri tribes of the regions of Holeylan and Zardalan were often collectively referred to as Holeylani and Zardalani. Mehmed Hurşid Paşa, a member of the Russian-Ottoman-Persian border surveying commission from 1848 to 1852, mentioned the Holeylani tribes as Osmanwand, Jalalwand, Dajiyawand, Balawand, and Suramiri, and labelled them all as Feyli Kurds. Mohammad Javadipour listed the tribes of Holeylan and Zardalan as Holeylan, Zardalan, Osmanvand, Jalalvand, Balavand, Kowsavand, and Dajivand. Iraj Asfhar Sistani listed the tribes of Holeylan and Zardalan as the Balavand, Zardalani, Tarhani, Jalalvand, and Osmanvand, adding that they were entirely Shia Muslims. Others generally listed the same tribes. Jacques de Morgan described the tribes of Holeylan as "Laki Kurds" and distinguished them from the nearby community of "Feyli Lurs". The Balavand, Zardalani, and Tarhani tribes historically lived close to the tribes of Tarhan in Lorestan, although within the Ilam province. Holeylan, along with Harsin, were historically bordered by Luristan to the southwest, and were traditionally part of Kermanshah. The Holeylan were considered an important Kurdish tribe to the southeast of Kermanshah.
