= Hukani-ye Sofla =

Hukani-ye Sofla هوكاني سفلي
- Village
- Location within Iran
- Coordinates: 34°09′32″N 46°13′47″E
- Country: Iran
- Province: Kermanshah
- County: Dalahu
- Bakhsh: Central
- Rural District: Howmeh-ye Kerend

Population (2006)
  - Total: 36
- Time zone: UTC+3:30 (IRST)
  - Summer (DST): UTC+4:30 (IRDT)

Hukani-ye Sofla (Persian: هوكاني سفلي, also Romanized as Hūkanī-ye Soflá; also known as Hūkānī, Hūkanī-ye Sabzeh, and Hūkānī-ye Sabzeh Soflá) is a village in Howmeh-ye Kerend Rural District, in the Central District of Dalahu County, Kermanshah Province, Iran. At the 2006 census, its population was 36, in 10 families.
