= Beyranvand (tribe) =

Laki-speaking tribe in Iran

Regions with significant populations
- Lorestan province

Languages
- Laki

Religion
- Shia Islam

The Beyranvand (Persian: بیرانوند) are a Laki-speaking tribe living mainly in western Iran, mostly concentrated around the Lorestan province and adjacent areas. The Beyranvand mostly speak Laki and follow Shia Islam. They were historically one of the prominent tribes of Lorestan.

== History ==
The name Beyranvand is commonly said to derive from their ancestor named Beyran. Despite the similarities, their name was not connected to Baravand, which appeared in historical records and was also the name of a nearby region in Lorestan, as the Beyranvand tribe were believed to have been more recent migrants to Lorestan. Some historical documents referred to the tribe as "Piranvand". Either way, the tribe was known as both Beyranvand and Piranvand.

Neither the name nor population of the Beyranvand were mentioned before the Qajar era. During the Qajar and Pahlavi periods, the reported population statistics and figures were often contradictory, ranging from 1,000 families to 10,000 families. The Beyranvand were claimed to have migrated to Lorestan from the Mosul region in the late Safavid period along with the Bajalan. The Beyranvand and Bajalan in Lorestan spoke Laki and after the Afsharid era they gradually outnumbered the Luri speaking tribes of Kushaki, Saki, Chegeni, and others. The Beyranvand tribe supported Karim Khan Zand. The Beyranvand tribe were one of the closest tribes to Karim Khan Zand and extensively helped him in battles. They were his closest allied tribe in Lorestan, while the ruling Vali dynasty and the Feyli Lurs were generally opposed to Karim Khan Zand. When Agha Mohammad Khan Qajar came to power, the Beyranvand and Hasanvand tribes were targeted by the new government and revolted. Fath-Ali Shah Qajar ordered the massacre of the Beyranvand and Bajalan tribes due to their participation in a revolt led by his son Hossein Qoli Khan. From that period until the early Pahlavi period, over 60 Beyranvand tribe leaders died in conflicts with the state and rival tribes. The Beyranvand tribe resisted the reforms of Reza Shah during the 1920s. The Beyranvand did most of the fighting against Reza Shah during his campaign in Lorestan.

The Beyranvand tribe was claimed to be divided into two tribes, Alainan (Alahinan), and Dashi Nu (Dashayinan), which were said to descend from two sons of Beyran. Sometimes they were referred to as Alivand and Dushivand. The Alainan were traditionally divided into two clans, Mal Asay (Mal-e Asad) and Mal Qowa (Mal-e Qobad). Mal-e Asad was divided into the clans of Kar, Mehru (Mehrab), Ziyali (Zayd-Ali), and Varuni (Barani). Mal-e Qobad was divided into the clans of Shamsi (Shamsuddin), Yarahmad, and Suzali (Sabz-Ali). Beyranvand tribe leaders historically came from the Shamsi clan. The Dashayinan were divided into the clans of Pirdada, Rash, Chaqal (Shaghal), Devakan, Daluran, Shavardi, and Luri.

Although the Beyranvand and Dalvand tribes spoke Laki, Minorsky mentioned them as tribes of Bala Gariva. A linguistic survey later showed that the Beyranvand were the only tribe in the Bala Gariva confederation which spoke Laki. However, Iranian scholars clarified that the Beyranvand, of Lak origin from northern Lorestan, did not have kinship ties with the Lur tribes of Bala Gariva. The Beyranvand were also mentioned as part of the Selseleh.

The Beyranvand tribe traditionally lived in the regions of Chaqalvandi, also known as Beyranvand, and Haro, close to Khorramabad, and part of the Borujerd region, as well as around the Karkheh river in the south of Ilam province. Many Beyranvand also settled near Mazhin, Hassaniyeh, and Khorramabad. There are also communities of Beyranvand scattered in further regions, deported there by Nader Shah and subsequent rulers. Some of them were also moved by Karim Khan Zand to consolidate his power in regions such as Shiraz.
