= Gav Sur =

Village in Kermanshah province, Iran

Gav Sur Persian: گاوسور
- Village
- Location within Iran
- Coordinates: 34°09′29″N 46°18′36″E
- Country: Iran
- Province: Kermanshah
- County: Dalahu
- District: Central
- Rural District: Howmeh-ye Kerend

Population (2016)
  - Total: 768
- Time zone: UTC+3:30 (IRST)

Gav Sur (Persian: گاوسور) (Note: Also romanized as Gāv Sūr; also known as Gausurkh, Gav-e Sorkh, and Gāv Sorkh) is a village in Howmeh-ye Kerend Rural District of the Central District of Dalahu County, Kermanshah province, Iran.

== Demographics ==
=== Population ===
At the time of the 2006 National Census, the village's population was 894 in 183 households. The following census in 2011 counted 783 people in 185 households. The 2016 census measured the population of the village as 768 people in 196 households. It was the most populous village in its rural district.
