= Shalan, Dalahu =

Neighborhood in Kermanshah province, Iran

Shalan Persian: شالان
- Neighborhood
- Location within Iran
- Coordinates: 34°28′45″N 46°00′02″E
- Country: Iran
- Province: Kermanshah
- County: Dalahu
- District: Central
- City: Rizhaw

Population (2011)
  - Total: 285
- Time zone: UTC+3:30 (IRST)

Shalan (Persian: شالان) (Note: Also romanized as Shālān) is a neighborhood in the city of Rizhaw in the Central District of Dalahu County, Kermanshah province, Iran.

== Demographics ==
=== Population ===
At the time of the 2006 National Census, Shalan's population was 298 in 68 households, when it was a village in Ban Zardeh Rural District. The following census in 2011 counted 285 people in 73 households.

In 2013, the village of Shahrak-e Rijab merged with the villages of Baba Jani-ye Abd ol Mohammad, Baba Jani-ye Shah Morad, Banmazaran, Darabi, and Shalan to become the city of Rizhaw.
