= Zardeh, Dalahu =

Village in Kermanshah province, Iran

Zardeh Persian: زرده
- Village
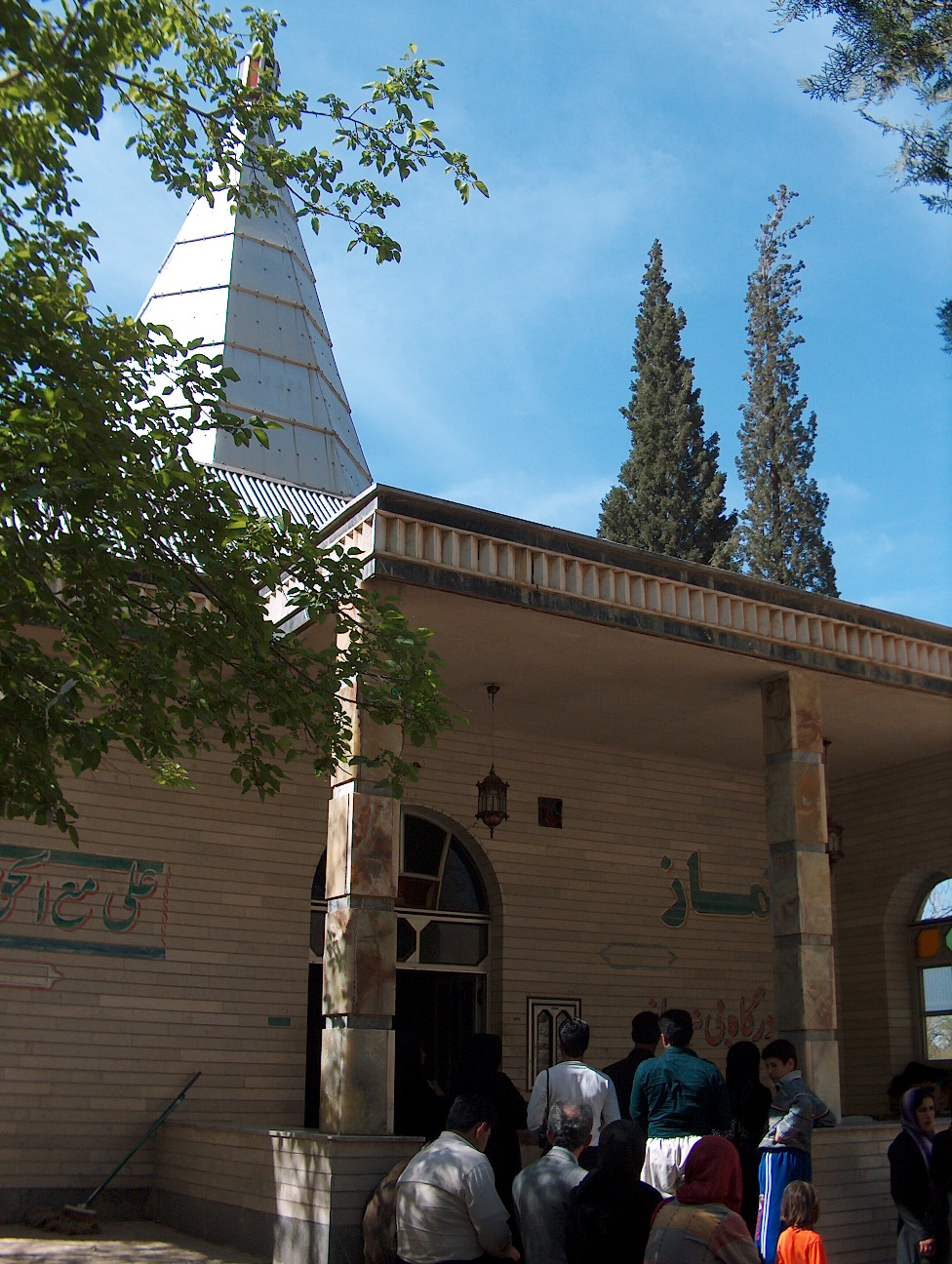
- The Holy Tomb of Dawoud is one of the sacred shrines of Yarsanism

- Location within Iran
- Coordinates: 34°32′35″N 45°57′12″E
- Country: Iran
- Province: Kermanshah
- County: Dalahu
- District: Central
- Rural District: Ban Zardeh

Population (2016)
  - Total: 1,087
- Time zone: UTC+3:30 (IRST)

Zardeh (Persian: زرده) (Note: Also known as Razdeh and Zarde) is a village in Ban Zardeh Rural District of the Central District of Dalahu County, Kermanshah province, Iran.

== Demographics ==
=== Ethnicity ===
The village is populated by Kurds and is one of the most important sites in the Yarsani religion as it contains the Holy Tomb of Dawoud.

=== Population ===
At the time of the 2006 National Census, the village's population was 1,204 in 240 households. The following census in 2011 counted 1,282 people in 296 households. The 2016 census measured the population of the village as 1,087 people in 318 households. It was the most populous village in its rural district.
