= Kerend-e Gharb =

City in Kermanshah province, Iran

Kerend-e Gharb Persian: کرندغرب
- City
- Location within Iran
- Coordinates: 34°16′36″N 46°14′15″E
- Country: Iran
- Province: Kermanshah
- County: Dalahu
- District: Central

Population (2016)
  - Total: 7,798
- Time zone: UTC+3:30 (IRST)

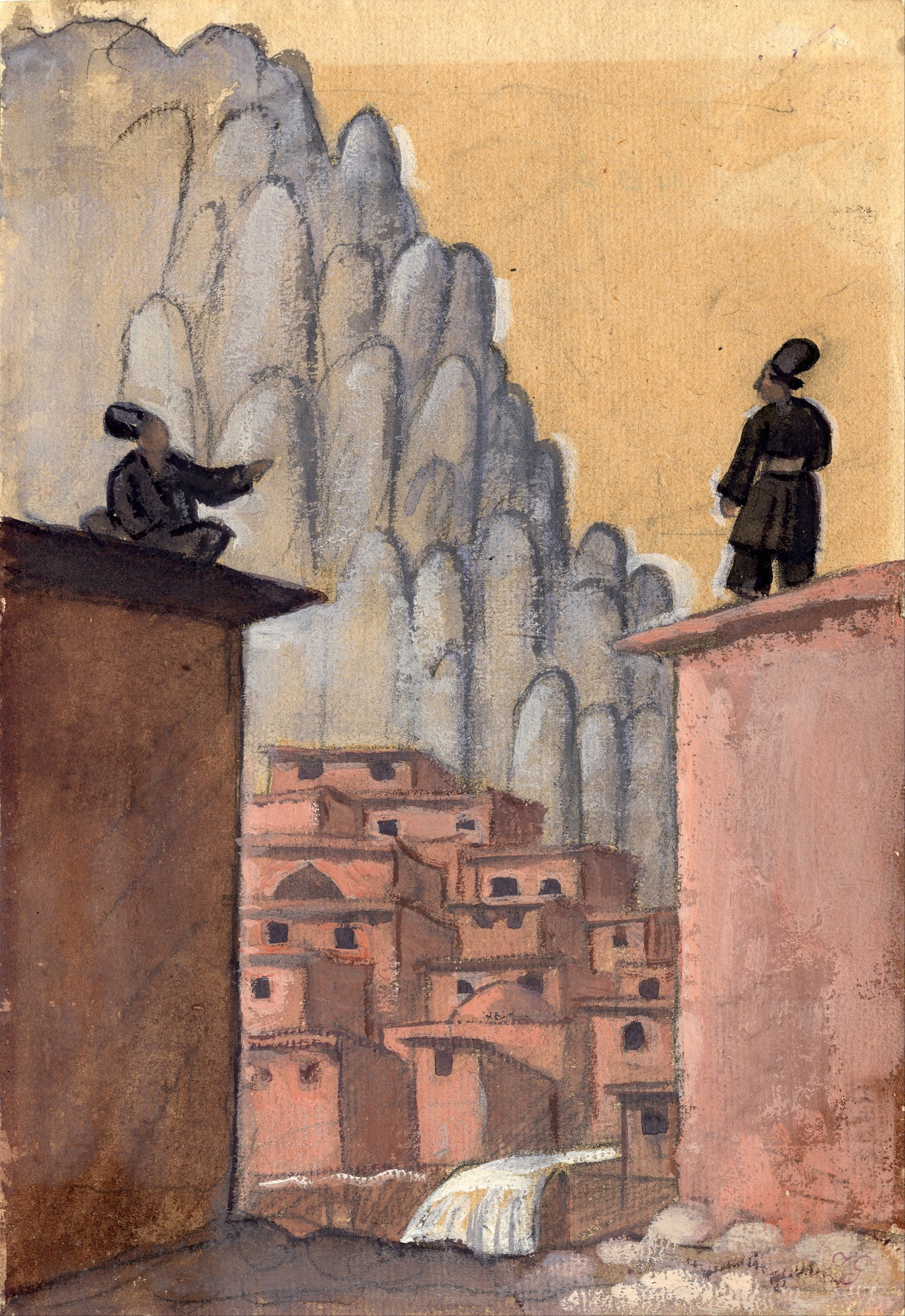
Kurds on the Roof, a scene painted by Jāzeps Grosvalds while he was British first lieutenant of the British Expeditionary Group. The scene was painted when they crossed Kerend near Kermanshah.

Kerend-e Gharb (Persian: کرندغرب) (Note: Also known as Karand, Karīnd, Kerend, and Kirin (Kurdish: نكرن ,کرن)) is a city in the Central District of Dalahu County, Kermanshah province, Iran, serving as capital of both the county and the district.

== Demographics ==
=== Language and ethnicity ===
The city is populated by Kurds and is important in the Yarsani religion as it is the location of the tombs of the holy men Pir Benjamin and Pir Musi.

Language distribution in the city:

Kerend-e Gharb linguistic composition
language	percent
Gorani	90%
Southern Kurdish	5%
Central Kurdish	5%

=== Population ===
At the time of the 2006 National Census, the city's population was 7,894 in 2,041 households. The following census in 2011 counted 8,311 people in 2,359 households. The 2016 census measured the population of the city as 7,798 people in 2,349 households.
