= Sheykh Hasan, Kermanshah =

Sheykh Hasan شيخ حسن
- Village
- Location within Iran
- Coordinates: 34°23′56″N 46°11′52″E
- Country: Iran
- Province: Kermanshah
- County: Dalahu
- Bakhsh: Central
- Rural District: Bivanij

Population (2006)
  - Total: 83
- Time zone: UTC+3:30 (IRST)
  - Summer (DST): UTC+4:30 (IRDT)

Sheykh Hasan (Persian: شيخ حسن, also Romanized as Sheykh Ḩasan; also known as Bīvehnīj and Shaikhan) is a village in Bivanij Rural District, in the Central District of Dalahu County, Kermanshah Province, Iran. At the 2006 census, its population was 83, in 18 families.
