= Zardeh Savar =

Zardeh Savar (Persian: زرده سوار) may refer to:

- Zardeh Savar, Itivand-e Jonubi, a village in Itivand-e Jonubi Rural District, Kakavand District, Delfan County, Lorestan Province, Iran
- Zardeh Savar, Kakavand-e Sharqi, a village in Kakavand-e Sharqi Rural District, Kakavand District, Delfan County, Lorestan Province, Iran
- Zardeh Savar, Kuhdasht, a village in Kuhdasht County, Lorestan Province, Iran
