= Rizhaw =

City in Kermanshah province, Iran

Rizhaw Persian: ریژاو Kurdish: ڕێژاو
- City
- Location within Iran
- Coordinates: 34°28′23″N 45°58′57″E
- Country: Iran
- Province: Kermanshah
- County: Dalahu
- District: Central

Population (2016)
  - Total: 3,907
- Time zone: UTC+3:30 (IRST)

Rizhaw (Persian: ریژاو) (Note: Formerly Shahrak-e Rijab (شهرك ريجاب), also romanized as Shahrak-e Rījāb; also known as Rījāb and Rijaw Kurdish: ڕێژاو) is a city in the Central District of Dalahu County, Kermanshah province, Iran, serving as the administrative center for Ban Zardeh Rural District. Rizhaw is in an agricultural and tourist area due to its picturesque nature.

== Etymology ==
The Kurdish word of Rijaw is a literal term meaning "water drop."

== History ==
In 2013, the village of Shahrak-e Rijab merged with the villages of Baba Jani-ye Abd ol Mohammad, Baba Jani-ye Shah Morad, Banmazaran, Darabi, and Shalan and was elevated to city status as Rizhaw.

== Demographics ==
=== Population ===
At the time of the 2006 National Census, Shahrak-e Rijab's population was 800 in 170 households, when it was a village in Ban Zardeh Rural District. The following census in 2011 counted 881 people in 233 households. The 2016 census measured the population as 3,907 people in 1,108 households, by which time Shahrak-e Rijab was elevated to city status as Rizhaw.
