= Seyyed Mohammad, Kermanshah =

Seyyed Mohammad سيدمحمد
- Village
- Location within Iran
- Coordinates: 34°33′35″N 45°55′54″E
- Country: Iran
- Province: Kermanshah
- County: Dalahu
- Bakhsh: Central
- Rural District: Ban Zardeh

Population (2006)
  - Total: 195
- Time zone: UTC+3:30 (IRST)
  - Summer (DST): UTC+4:30 (IRDT)

Seyyed Mohammad (Persian: سيدمحمد, also Romanized as Seyyed Moḩammad; also known as Seyyed Moḩammad-e Zardeh and Zardeh-ye Seyyed Moḩammad) is a village in Ban Zardeh Rural District, in the Central District of Dalahu County, Kermanshah Province, Iran. At the 2006 census, its population was 195, in 32 families.
