= Barzinjah =

Barzinjah بەرزنجە
- Town
- Location within Iraq
- Country: Iraq; Kurdistan Region
- Governorate: Sulaymaniyah

Barzinjah or Barzinja (Kurdish: بەرزنجە, romanized: Berzince) is a town in Sulaymaniyah Province in Kurdistan Region, Iraq and has an elevation of 1,275 meters.

== Notable people ==
- Sultan Sahak
