= Rojbayani (tribe) =

Kurdish tribe in Iraq and Iran

The Rojbayani (Kurdish: ڕۆژبەیانی, Rojbeyanî; Persian: روژبیانی، روزبهانی) are a Kurdish tribe living mainly in parts of Iraq and Iran, traditionally settled around Kirkuk. They speak Kurdish and mostly follow Sunni Islam.

== History ==
The name of the Rojbayani tribe was claimed to derive from the Kurdish words "roj" (ڕۆژ), meaning "day", and "bayani" (بەیانی), meaning "morning", although others claimed it was merely oral tradition. Others derived the name from Rojbayan, which they claimed derived from Ruzbahan, who was said to be their ancestor. They added that some Rojbayani leaders and writers wrote their names interchangeably as Rojbayani and Ruzbahani. They added that the shift from Ruzbahani to Rojbayani was typical as the sounds "z" and "h" in Persian often shifted to "j" and "i" in Kurdish. In the Sharafnama, written in Persian, Rojbayani was written as Ruzbahani.

Some claimed that the Rojbayani descended from Ruzbahan ibn Vindadh-Khurshid, a Daylamite who fought against Mu'izz al-Dawla of the Buyids and died near Baghdad. Hamdallah Mustawfi, and later Sharafkhan Bidlisi, listed the Ruzbahani as a tribe living in Lur-e-Kuchak. Sharafkhan Bidlisi additionally listed them among the "Lak and Zand" category of the Iranian Kurds, and it was seen as a clear reference to the Rojbayani. Sharafkhan Bidlisi listed the Rojbayani as part of the Zangana. There was a claim suggesting the Rojbayani were linked to the historical Ruzbahani Lur tribe which ruled over Shulestan. However, links between the Kurdish Rojbayani and historical Lur Ruzbahani of Fars were generally rejected. The Rojbayani tribe were agreed to be Kurdish and historically part of the Guran confederation before it declined. The traditional region of the Rojbayani, from Sarpol-e Zahab to Kirkuk, was historically the scene of many wars between the Ottomans and Iranians. In the mid-16th century, Abu Bakr Rojbayani ruled over Derteng and Hulwan and was additionally rewarded Sharazur by Suleiman the Magnificent. According to Sekandar Amanolahi Baharvand, the Lur tribe of Ruzbihani living around Ashtarnian in Borujerd were descendants of the historical Ruzbihani Lur tribe.

The Rojbayani tribe traditionally lived in the region of Garmiyan, mainly in Kirkuk and its surroundings, which historically served as the center for the tribe. They traditionally lived around Qara Hasan, Leylan, Khidir Bolagh, and Furqan. The tribe also lived in Bardarash, Khanaqin, and Kalar, and the villages between them, and near Qasr-e Shirin. The cities of Shirwana in Kalar and Bingura and Qalama in Khanaqin historically served as the center for the Rojbayani in those regions. Around Erbil, they lived among the Dizayi, Mamesini, and Siyan tribes. There was a historic castle in Bukan known as the Rojbayani castle, although its relation to the tribe was uncertain. Some of the Rojbayani who lived near the Shabaks were integrated among them.

The Rojbayani mainly followed Shafi'i Sunni Islam and were claimed to have been previously Yarsani or Ali-Allahi. The Rojbayani dialect was historically a variant of Gorani influenced by the Kurdish dialects of the Jaf and Kalhor, although the Rojbayani adopted Sorani after the establishment of the Kurdistan Region.

In February 2024, Sirwan Rojbayani from the Kurdistan Democratic Party (KDP) was elected as the Deputy Governor in Nineveh province.
