= Sultan Sahak =

Kurdish religious founder and leader

Dervish Sultan Sahak
- Born: Barzinjah
- Died: Sheykhan, near Diyala River
- Other name: Sultan Ishaq Barzanjî
- Era: fl. late 14th century to early 15th century
- Known for: Reformer of the modern beliefs in Yarsanism
- Notable work: Kalâm-e Saranjâm
- Movement: Yarsanism
- Parents: Shaykh Isa (father); Khatun Dayerah (mother)

Sultan Sahak or Sultan Ishaq Barzancî (Kurdish: سوڵتان سەھاک; fl. late 14th century to early 15th century) was a religious leader who reformed the modern beliefs of Yarsanism and moreover considered to be the manifestation of God. During his life, he had the role of overseeing the religious instructions of his angels and disciples. Many subsequent Yarsan leaders would trace their genealogy to Sultan Sahak.

== Life ==
No consensus exist on when Sultan Sahak lived. Scholar Sadigh Safizadeh puts his date of birth between 1053 and 1215 AD. Yarsan sources consider the emergence of Sultan Sahak at the end of the 7th century. However, it is more probable that he lived around the late Mongol era and the rise of Timur, since it is narrated that Timur himself met with the Sultan.

Sultan Sahak was born in a poor Kurdish family in Barzinjah near Sulaymaniyah and came from a well-known line of Kurdish sheikhs. His family had moved to the region from Hamadan long before his birth. His mother Khatun Dayerah was daughter of the famous Hasan Beg of the Jaff tribe, while his father Shaykh Isa, son of Seyyed Ali Barzanji Gorani, was a Sufi leader. According to Yarsan mythology, his birth was miraculous, as he appeared in the form of a divine falcon.

It is said that he studied under Mulla Ilyas Shahrazuri before settling in Baghdad where he studied at the famous Nizamiyya of Baghdad. He afterwards travelled to Damascus and Mecca for the Hajj pilgrimage. He returned to Kurdistan and built a mosque in his native town Barzinjah to guide the local people. After the death of his father, the Sultan fell into a conflict with his brothers and he decided to settle in Sheykhan village in Avroman, where he refounded the Yarsan beliefs. This story is however rejected by Yarsan traditions.

Sultan Sahak was a chief Dervish and had 12,000 followers in Avroman alone. Of his followers, he chose four (Benyamin, Piri Musi, Dawud and Razbar) to carry out religious instructions. These four disciples are considered angels in Yarsanism. The main religious book Kalâm-e Saranjâm was written when Sultan Sahak lived in Sheykhan village. He died near the village of Sheykhan on the Sirvan River. When Vladimir Minorsky visited his site in 1914, he vividly described the location and the rituals associated with the grave.

== Bibliography ==
- Hamzeh'ee, M. Reza (1990), The Yaresan: a sociological, historical, and religio-historical study of a Kurdish community, Berlin: K. Schwarz, ISBN 3-922968-83-X, OCLC 23438701
- Hosseini, S. Behnaz (2020), Yārsān of Iran, Socio-Political Changes and Migration, Palgrave Macmillan, ISBN 978-981-15-2637-4
- Matti, Moosa (1988), Extremist Shiites: The Ghulat Sects, Syracuse University Press
- Shams, Ismail (2016), "سلطان اسحاق", Center for the Great Islamic Encyclopedia (in Persian)
- Vali, Shahab (2008), Les figures de l'Iran pré-islamique dans la littérature des Yârsâns, courant religieux kurde (in French), Paris: École pratique des hautes études. Section des sciences religieuses, p. 47
