= Seyyed Mohammad, Fars =

Seyyed Mohammad سيدمحمد
- Village
- Location within Iran
- Coordinates: 30°21′06″N 51°40′41″E
- Country: Iran
- Province: Fars
- County: Mamasani
- Bakhsh: Central
- Rural District: Jowzar

Population (2006)
  - Total: 190
- Time zone: UTC+3:30 (IRST)
  - Summer (DST): UTC+4:30 (IRDT)

Seyyed Mohammad (Persian: سيدمحمد, also Romanized as Seyyed Moḩammad) is a village in Jowzar Rural District, in the Central District of Mamasani County, Fars province, Iran. At the 2006 census, its population was 190, in 40 families.
