= Emamzadeh Mohammad, Khuzestan =

Emamzadeh Mohammad امامزاده محمد
- Village
- Location within Iran
- Coordinates: 30°22′21″N 50°19′25″E
- Country: Iran
- Province: Khuzestan
- County: Behbahan
- Bakhsh: Central
- Rural District: Howmeh

Population (2006)
  - Total: 32
- Time zone: UTC+3:30 (IRST)
  - Summer (DST): UTC+4:30 (IRDT)

Emamzadeh Mohammad (Persian: امامزاده محمد, also Romanized as Emāmzādeh Moḩammad; also known as Shāhzādeh Moḩammad) is a village in Howmeh Rural District, in the Central District of Behbahan County, Khuzestan Province, Iran. At the 2006 census, its population was 32, in 7 families.
