= Vileh, Kurdistan =

Vileh ويله
- Village
- Location within Iran
- Coordinates: 35°35′37″N 46°18′31″E
- Country: Iran
- Province: Kurdistan
- County: Marivan
- Bakhsh: Sarshiv
- Rural District: Sarshiv

Population (2006)
  - Total: 153
- Time zone: UTC+3:30 (IRST)
  - Summer (DST): UTC+4:30 (IRDT)

Vileh (Persian: ويله, also Romanized as Vīleh, Vaileh, and Vayleh) is a village in Sarshiv Rural District, Sarshiv District, Marivan County, Kurdistan Province, Iran. At the 2006 census, its population was 153, in 28 families. The village is populated by Kurds.
