= Zardeh Savar, Kuhdasht =

Zardeh Savar زرده سوار
- Village
- Location within Iran
- Coordinates: 33°28′09″N 47°30′49″E
- Country: Iran
- Province: Lorestan
- County: Kuhdasht
- Bakhsh: Central
- Rural District: Gol Gol

Population (2006)
  - Total: 58
- Time zone: UTC+3:30 (IRST)
  - Summer (DST): UTC+4:30 (IRDT)

Zardeh Savar (Persian: زرده سوار, also Romanized as Zardeh Savār) is a village in Gol Gol Rural District, in the Central District of Kuhdasht County, Lorestan Province, Iran. At the 2006 census, its population was 58, in 11 families.
