= Emamzadeh Mohammad, Qazvin =

Emamzadeh Mohammad امامزاده محمد
- Village
- Location within Iran
- Coordinates: 36°31′06″N 50°12′52″E
- Country: Iran
- Province: Qazvin
- County: Qazvin
- Bakhsh: Alamut-e Gharbi
- Rural District: Rudbar-e Shahrestan

Population (2006)
  - Total: 105
- Time zone: UTC+3:30 (IRST)
  - Summer (DST): UTC+4:30 (IRDT)

Emamzadeh Mohammad (Persian: امامزاده محمد, also Romanized as Emāmzādeh Moḩammad) is a village located in Rudbar-e Shahrestan Rural District, Alamut-e Gharbi District, Qazvin County, Qazvin Province, Iran. According to the 2006 census, the village had a population of 105 people living in 29 families.
