= Tarhan (tribe) =

Group of tribes in northern Lorestan

The Tarhan (Persian: طرهان) are a collection of tribes living mainly in western Iran, mostly around the region of Tarhan in northern and western Luristan, but also in other regions. Some of the tribes speak Luri, while others speak Laki. They mostly follow Shia Islam.

== History ==
The tribes of Tarhan were grouped together and named after their homeland, the historical region of Tarhan, which later corresponded with Kuhdasht and Rumeshkan. In a tribal survey by the government of Borujerd and Luristan, the tribes of Tarhan were listed as Amra'i, Suri, Garavand, Ramavand, Adinavand, Koruni (Kunani), Zeruni (Zerani), Kushaki, Garma'i, Saravand (Sohrabvand), Romiyani, Chavari, Bavali, Owlad-e Qobad, and Kamalvand. They were entirely Shia Muslims. The tribes of Tarhan included tribes which variously spoke Luri or Laki, and the tribes historically segregated themselves based on the ethnic differences.

According to Iranica, the region of Tarhan was located around Kuhdasht in western Lorestan province, and included the Lur tribes of Suri, Amra'i, Alivand, Khoshnamvand, Garma'i, and Shiravand, as well as the Lak tribes of Garavand, Adinavand, Kunani, Azadbakht, and Owlad-e Qobad. Minorsky listed the main groups of Lur as the tribes of Tarhan, Delfan, Selseleh, and Bala Gariva, labelling the first three as Lak and the last one as truly Lur, and also added that the tribes of Tarhan were mainly Shia, but that many of the Amala tribe were Yarsani. The two main Lak groups were the Delfan and Selseleh, although there were also Laki speakers among Luri speaking tribes, and while Oskar Mann described the Tarhan as Lak majority, Amanollahi accounted for the Laks of Tarhan but did not describe them as the majority. Many Lak tribes of Tarhan originated from Delfan but historically migrated and settled in Tarhan. Hamid Izadpanah claimed that all Laki-speaking tribes of Tarhan immigrated there from northern Lorestan.

The tribes of Tarhan, under the general leadership of Nazar Ali Khan Amra’i, suffered greatly when Reza Shah came to power, and they began to settle or migrate to other provinces.
