= Shalan, Kermanshah =

Shalan شلان
- Village
- Location within Iran
- Coordinates: 34°13′49″N 47°09′41″E
- Country: Iran
- Province: Kermanshah
- County: Kermanshah
- Bakhsh: Central
- Rural District: Qarah Su

Population (2006)
  - Total: 87
- Time zone: UTC+3:30 (IRST)
  - Summer (DST): UTC+4:30 (IRDT)

Shalan (Persian: شلان, also Romanized as Shalān) is a village in Qarah Su Rural District, in the Central District of Kermanshah County, Kermanshah Province, Iran. At the 2006 census, its population was 87, in 19 families.
