= Sheykh Hasan, Khuzestan =

Sheykh Hasan شيخ حسن
- Village
- Location within Iran
- Coordinates: 32°12′00″N 48°22′00″E
- Country: Iran
- Province: Khuzestan
- County: Shush
- Bakhsh: Central
- Rural District: Hoseynabad

Population (2006)
  - Total: 419
- Time zone: UTC+3:30 (IRST)
  - Summer (DST): UTC+4:30 (IRDT)

Sheykh Hasan (Persian: شيخ حسن, also Romanizeed as Sheykh Ḩasan; also known as Sheykh Ḩoseyn) is a village in Hoseynabad Rural District, in the Central District of Shush County, Khuzestan Province, Iran. At the 2006 census, its population was 419, in 65 families.
