= Veyleh, Gahvareh =

Veyleh ويله
- Village
- Location within Iran
- Coordinates: 34°22′43″N 46°21′32″E
- Country: Iran
- Province: Kermanshah
- County: Dalahu
- Bakhsh: Gahvareh
- Rural District: Gurani

Population (2006)
  - Total: 85
- Time zone: UTC+3:30 (IRST)
  - Summer (DST): UTC+4:30 (IRDT)

Veyleh (Persian: ويله; also known as Veyleh-ye Do) is a village in Gurani Rural District, Gahvareh District, Dalahu County, Kermanshah Province, Iran. At the 2006 census, its population was 85, in 18 families.
