= Harsin =

City in Kermanshah province, Iran

Harsin Kurdish: هەرسین
- City
- Persian: هرسین
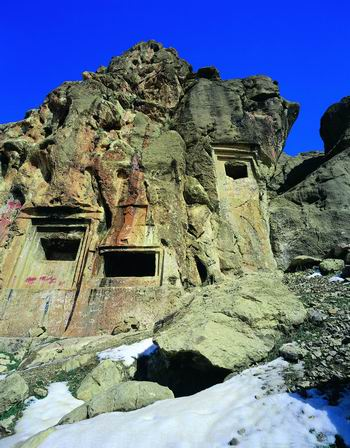
- Eshaqvand rock tombs

- Location within Iran
- Coordinates: 34°16′14″N 47°34′49″E
- Country: Iran
- Province: Kermanshah
- County: Harsin
- District: Central
- Established: 550 BC

Population (2016)
  - Total: 44,146
- Time zone: UTC+3:30 (IRST)

Harsin (Kurdish: هەرسین, romanized: Hersîn, Persian: هرسين, romanized: Harsīn) is a city in the Central District of Harsin County, Kermanshah province, Iran, serving as capital of both the county and the district. Harsin was founded in 550 BC.

== Demographics ==
=== Language and ethnicity ===
The city is populated by different Kurdish tribes including the Osmanvand and the Jalalvand who speak Laki Kurdish.

The Kurds of Harsin have their own subdialect of Laki known either "Harsini" or "Kermanshahi Laki", a vernacular between Xwarini and Laki Proper.

=== Population ===
At the time of the 2006 National Census, the city's population was 51,562 in 12,001 households. The following census in 2011 counted 49,967 people in 13,700 households. The 2016 census measured the population of the city as 44,146 people in 12,814 households.
