= Zardeh, Kangavar =

Zardeh زرده
- Village
- Location within Iran
- Coordinates: 34°32′56″N 45°57′10″E
- Country: Iran
- Province: Kermanshah
- County: Kangavar
- Bakhsh: Central
- Rural District: Fash

Population (2006)
  - Total: 75
- Time zone: UTC+3:30 (IRST)
  - Summer (DST): UTC+4:30 (IRDT)

Zardeh (Persian: زرده; also known as Razdeh and Zarde) is a village in Fash Rural District, in the Central District of Kangavar County, Kermanshah Province, Iran. At the 2006 census, its population was 75, in 18 families.
