= Kalâm-e Saranjâm =

Central text of the religion Yarsanism

Kalâm-e Saranjâm or simply Saranjâm (Kurdish: سەرەنجام یا کەڵام) is the central religious book in Yarsanism written in Gorani and Kurdish and contains old texts from the time of Sultan Sahak. Besides this book, other books can be considered part of the Saranjâm since they also contain texts from the same period. The texts could have been written by saints who were reincarnations of each other or had spiritual access to the period and therefore could contextualize what was said with what happened.

== Content ==
An authentic copy of Kalâm-e Saranjâm exists, written by Shâh Hayâsi Ahl-e Haqq in calligraphy. This text has 180 pages and contains chapters on Shâh Khoshin, Bâbâ Nâ’us, Sultan Shakar, the story of Pire wa Pirali, of Yâdegâr and Shâh Ebrâhimi, of the Haftawâna, The Twelve Imams, the Cheltan, the Qawaltâs, the recommendations of Soltân for the performance of the jem. The rest of the book contains poems. The text was translated to Russian by Vladimir Minorsky but is not available.

=== A hymn on sacrifice ===
The following is an extract from a hymn from Saranjâm:

Oh Friends offer sacrifice,

I shall tell you the rules and recitations of sacrifice,
We prepare and conclude the Soltani Fest,
Because it is the recommendation of the King of the great men in the Eternal Day,
The troops of Shah Khoshin will rejoice,
For the love of Davud as well as Benyamin,
At the time of straitened circumstances (tangi) and the removal of calamity,
It is advisable to offer sacrifice,
The first time Jebra'il brought a ram from the invisible world,
And instead of Ismail sacrificed it,
The tenth of the month of Zolhejah is the Feast of Sacrifice,

It is known to the whole world and the King...

== Bibliography ==
- Hamzee, M. Rezaa (1990), The Yaresan : a sociological, historical, and religio-historical study of a Kurdish community, Islamkundliche Untersuchungen (138)
