= Yarsanism =

Religion founded by Sultan Sahak in the late 14th century

Yarsanism یارسان
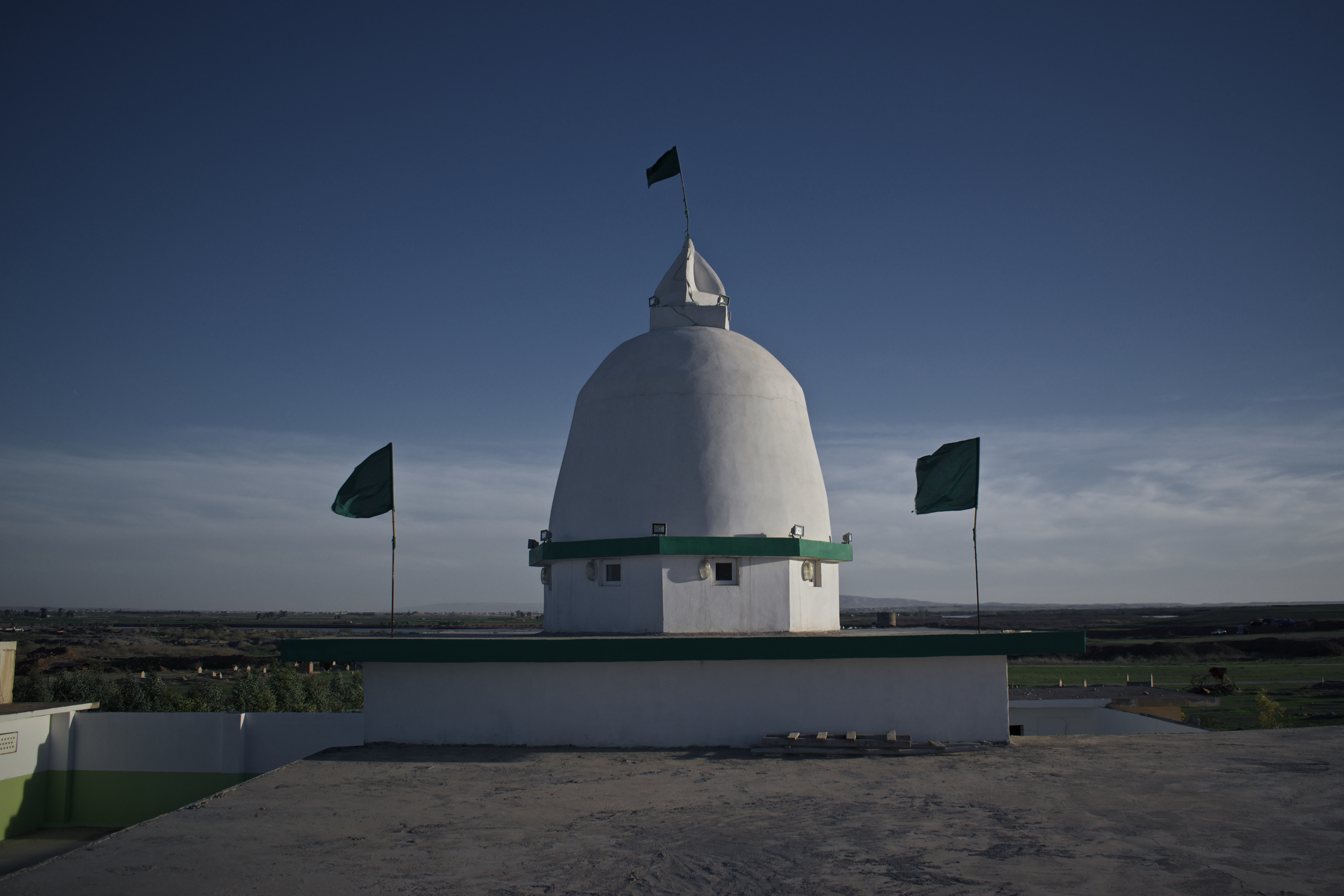
- Yarsan shrine of Shah Hayas in the village of Wardik near Mosul in Iraq
- Type: Ethnic religion
- Classification: Iranian, Abrahamic
- Scripture: Kalâm-e Saranjâm
- Theology: Syncretic
- Region: Iraqi Kurdistan, Iranian Kurdistan
- Language: Kurdish languages, Gorani, Azerbaijani
- Founder: Sultan Sahak
- Origin: late 14th century Western Iran
- Members: c. 500,000 to 1,000,000 (in Iran)
- Other names: Ahl-e Haqq, Kaka'i

Yarsanism (Kurdish: یارسان, romanized: Yarsan), Ahl-e Haqq (Kurdish: ئەهلی حەق, romanized: Ehlî Ḧeq; Persian: اهل حق), or Kaka'i, is a syncretic ethnoreligion founded by Sultan Sahak in the late 14th century in western Iran. The total number of followers of Yarsanism is estimated to be over half a million to one million in Iran. However, according to one source, there are as many as 3 million followers in Iran. The numbers in Iraq are unknown. However, according to one source there are 120 to 150 thousand followers in Iraq. The adherents are mostly Kurds, as well as some Shabaks, Laks, and Lurs.

Some Yarsanis in Iraq are called Kaka'i. Yarsanis say that some people refer to them disparagingly as "Ali Allahi" or "worshipers of Ali", labels which Yarsanis deny. As such, many Yarsanis hide their religious identity, and there are no exact statistics of their population.

The Yarsanis have a distinct religious literature primarily written in the Gorani language. However, few modern Yarsani can read or write Gorani, as their mother tongue is Southern Kurdish or Sorani. Some Yarsanis in Iran speak a Turkic language close to Azeri, while some Yarsanis in Iraq speak Arabic. However, Yarsani tradition claimed that all early Yarsanis used Gorani as their religious language, and that some Yarsani communities were forced to adopt another language.

Their central religious book is called the Kalâm-e Saranjâm, written in the 15th century and based on the teachings of Sultan Sahak.

== Geography ==
The majority of Yarsan followers live in Kermanshah Province and adjacent areas of Lorestan Province and Ilam Province in Iran. They are the predominant religious population in Mahidasht, Bivanij and Zohab districts of Kermanshah, and populate rural areas of Delfan, Holeylan, and Posht-e Kuh in Ilam and Lorestan.

The main urban centers of the religion are Sahneh, Kerend-e Gharb, and Gahvareh, and other important cities include Kermanshah, Sarpol-e Zahab and Qasr-e Shirin.

Yarsani adherents in Lorestan province included the Lak tribes of Nurali, Chavari, Mirbeg, Tarhan, and part of the Owlad Qobad in the counties of Delfan and Kuhdasht. Other areas in Iran with a significant Yarsan population include Hashtgerd and Varamin, near Tehran, and Maragheh and Tabriz in Iranian Azerbaijan, where important Turkic-speaking Yarsan communities live and use Turkic for many of their religious texts. The Yarsani tradition claims that all early communities used Gorani as their religious language, but that over time, some groups were forced to adopt a Turkic language closely akin to Azeri for all purposes, including religion.

In Iraq, Yarsan followers mainly live in Mosul, Kirkuk, Kalar, Khanaqin, Erbil, Sulaymaniyah, and Halabja.

== Beliefs ==
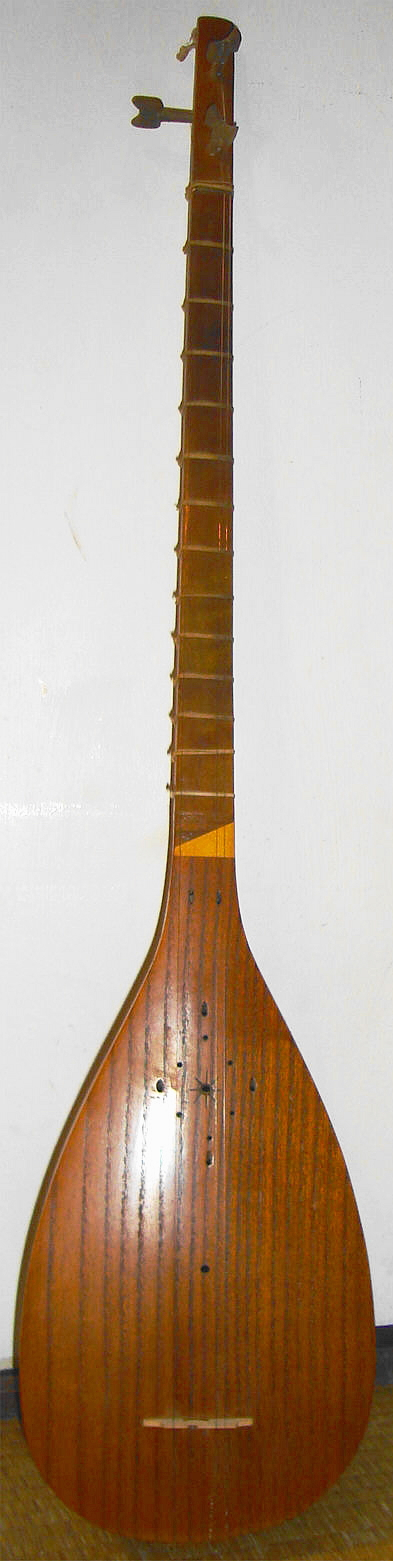
The Tambur is a sacred symbol of Yarsanism and is played during religious ceremonies.

The Yarsani follow the mystical teachings of Sultan Sahak (fl. 14th–15th century). From the Yarsani point of view, the universe is composed of two distinct yet interrelated worlds: the internal (bātinī) and the external (zāhirī), each having its own order and rules. Although humans are aware only of the outer world, their lives are governed by the rules of the inner world. This aspect of the Yarsani faith can be identified as Kurdish esotericism, which emerged under the intense influence of Sufi batiniyya.

Among other important pillars of their belief system are that the Divine Essence has successive manifestations in human form (mazhariyyat) and the belief in transmigration of the soul (dunaduni in Kurdish). Yarsanis believe that every person needs to do what is written within their holy book, the Kalâm-e Saranjâm; otherwise, they are not Yarsanis. There is no compulsion or exclusion in Yarsanism—anyone who chooses to follow its precepts is welcome. The Yarsani faith's features include millenarism, innatism, egalitarianism, metempsychosis, angelology, divine manifestation, and dualism.

=== Divine manifestations ===
The Yarsani are emanationists and incarnationists, believing that the Divine Essence has successive incarnations known as mazhariyyats (similar to Hindu avatars). They believe God manifests as an angel or human in one primary form and seven secondary forms during each epoch of the world. These seven manifestations are known collectively as the Haft Tan (Gurani: ھەفت تان, lit. '[the] Seven Persons') in Gurani. The primary mazhariyyat of the First Epoch was Khawandagar (خاوندگار, 'Lord'), the supreme source of authority and creation.

The primary mazhariyyat of the Second Epoch was Ali ibn Abi Talib, the fourth caliph and first imam of Shia Islam. Yarsanis are sometimes known pejoratively as Ali-Allahi (علی‌الهی, 'Ali is God') because of the prominent place of Ali in the faith. The primary mazhariyyat of the Third Epoch was Shah Khoshin.

In the Fourth Epoch, the primary mazhariyyat is believed to have been Sultan Sahak. It is said that his mother was Dayerak Rezbar or Khatun-e Rezbar, a Kurdish woman and virgin of the Jaff tribe. A legend recounts that, while sleeping under a pomegranate tree, a kernel of fruit fell into her mouth when a bird pecked the fruit directly over her. Sources vary on Rezbar's marital life: some state that she lived her entire life celibate and unmarried, while others state that she had married. Sources that claim she married generally argue that her husband was either a Kurdish man named Şêx Îsa (pronounced [ʃeːx ˈʔiːsɑ]; شێخ عیسا, 'Sheikh Isa')—from a priestly line of the Berzencî tribe—or an Arab sayyid. Whether either man fathered Sahak is debated among Yarsanis; the virgin birth of Sahak is contested by scholars of Yarsanism, and the presumed father is not considered a significant religious figure.

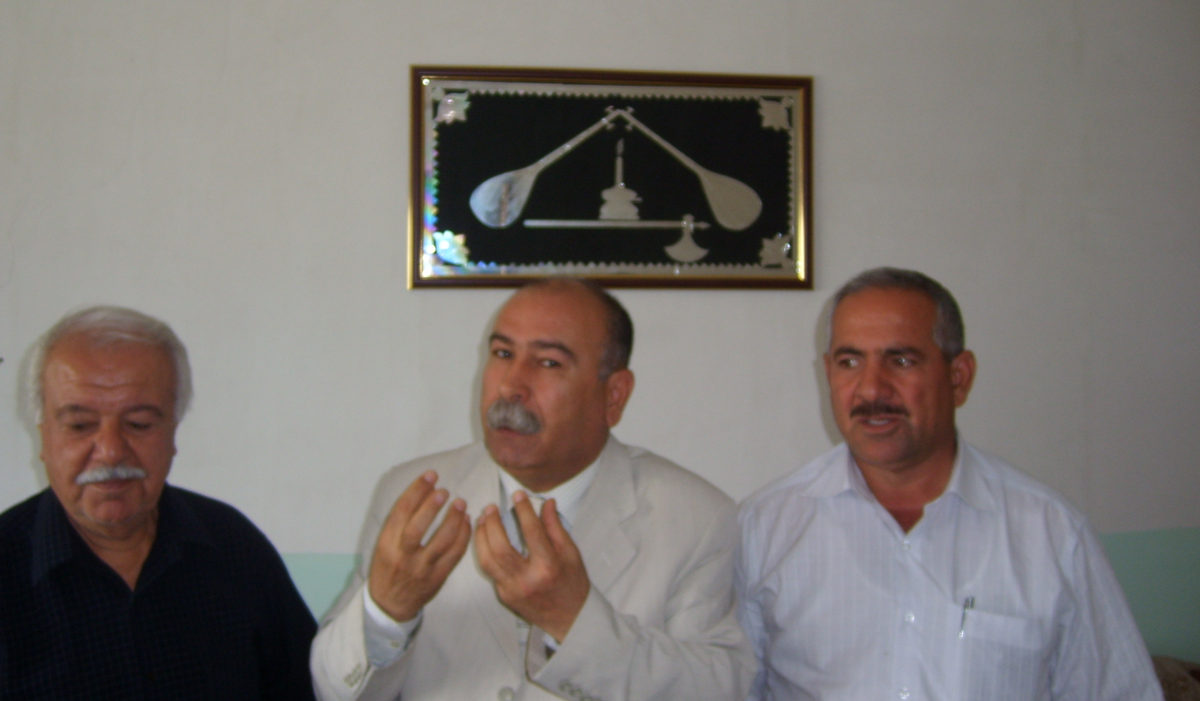
Yarsani men in Silêmanî, Iraqi Kurdistan. The picture on the wall is of the Kurdish tanbur, a Yarsani religious symbol.

=== Haft Tan or seven persons ===
Each Epoch in the Yarsani faith saw the appearance of the seven secondary divine manifestations or Haft Tan. In the First Epoch, they appeared in their true angelic form, while in subsequent Epochs, they appeared in human incarnations. The Haft Tan are charged with responsibility for the affairs of the internal realm.

The secondary mazhariyyats of the First Epoch include the archangels Gabriel, Michael, Israfil and Azrael, and a female angelic being.

The mazhariyyats of the Second Epoch include Salman, Qanbar, Muhammad, Nusayr (who is either Jesus Christ or Theophobus) and Bahlool. It also includes Fatimah, Muhammad's daughter, as the incarnation of the female angel.

The mazhariyyats of the Third Epoch include Shah Fazlullah Veli, Baba Sarhang Dudani and Baba Naous.

In the Fourth Epoch, the Haft Tan or 'seven persons' charged by Sultan Sahak with responsibility for the affairs of the inner realm consist of the following:

The "Haft Tan" (The Seven Archangels) are key figures in the Yarsani belief system and their history. The only female among them is Khatun-e Rezbar, the mother of Sultan Sahak.

1. Pir Benjamin, considered the incarnation of the archangel Gabriel; he has the preceptor title to all Yarsanis (Monday)
2. Pir Musi, the incarnation of the archangel Michael and known as the Recording angel (Tuesday)
3. Mustafā Dawan, the incarnation of archangel Azrael (Wednesday)
4. Sultan Sahak, the incarnation of Divine Essence (Thursday)
5. Baba Yadegar, also known as "Ahmad" and "Reza" (Friday)
6. Khatun-e Razbar (Saturday)
7. Dawud Koswar (David), also informally called Dawu; he is known as "Dalil" (in Kurdish) to all Yarsanis (Sunday)

These seven persons are known as "Haft Tan" which means literally "The Seven Persons".

=== Holy texts ===
The traditions of the Yarsani are preserved in poetry known as Kalâm-e Saranjâm (The Discourse of Conclusion), as well as in divinely revealed narratives passed down orally from generation to generation. These traditions are said to have been written down by Pir Musi, one of the seven companions of Sultan Sahak (also the angel in charge of recording human deeds). The collection consists of the epochs of Khawandagar [God], 'Alī, Shah Khoshin, and Sultan Sahak, the different manifestations of divinity. The epoch of Shah Khoshin takes place in Luristan, and the epoch of Sultan Sahak is placed in Hawraman near the Sirwan River, the land of the Goranî. Also important to the Goranî is the Daftar-e kezana-ye Perdivari (Book of the Treasure of Perdivar), a collection of twenty-six mythological poems or kalams.

The sayings attributed to Sultan Sahak are written in Gorani Kurdish, the sacred language of the Ahl-e Haqq, which is also known as the Hawrami dialects. However, few modern Yarsani can read or write Gorani as their mother tongue, as their mother tongues are Southern Kurdish and Sorani Kurdish, which belong to the other two branches of the Kurdish language family. Some Yarsani literature is written in Persian.

The older texts, known as the Perdiwari texts, date back to the 15th or 16th centuries. The texts are called Perdiwari because Perdiwar was where Sultan Sahak first founded the Yarsani community. The Perdiwari texts are attributed to writers from this first community of Yarsani believers. They include the following texts.

- Dowre-ye Bābā Khoshin
- Dowre-ye Bābā Nā'us
- Dowre-ye Bohlul
- Dowre-ye Bābā Jalil
- Bābā Sarhang
- Dowre-ye Soltān Sahāk
- Kalām-e Ābedin
- Kalām-e Ahmad
- Daftar-e Dāmyāri
- Šandarwi maramo (Kelim wa Duš)
- Bārgah Bārgah
- Dowre-ye Cheltan
- Kamākanān
- Zolāl Zolāl

Widely known non-Perdiwari texts are:

- Daftar-e Sheykh Amir
- Daftar-e Khān Almās
- Daftar-e Ābedin Jāf
- Daftar-e Ilbegi
- Daftar of Qushchioghli
- Daftars of other members of the group of 'Twenty-Four Poets', in Turkic (Azerbaijani)
- Daftar-e Zu'l-Feqār
- Daftar of the Thirty-Six Poets of the Period of Sayyed Brāke

== Sacred sites ==
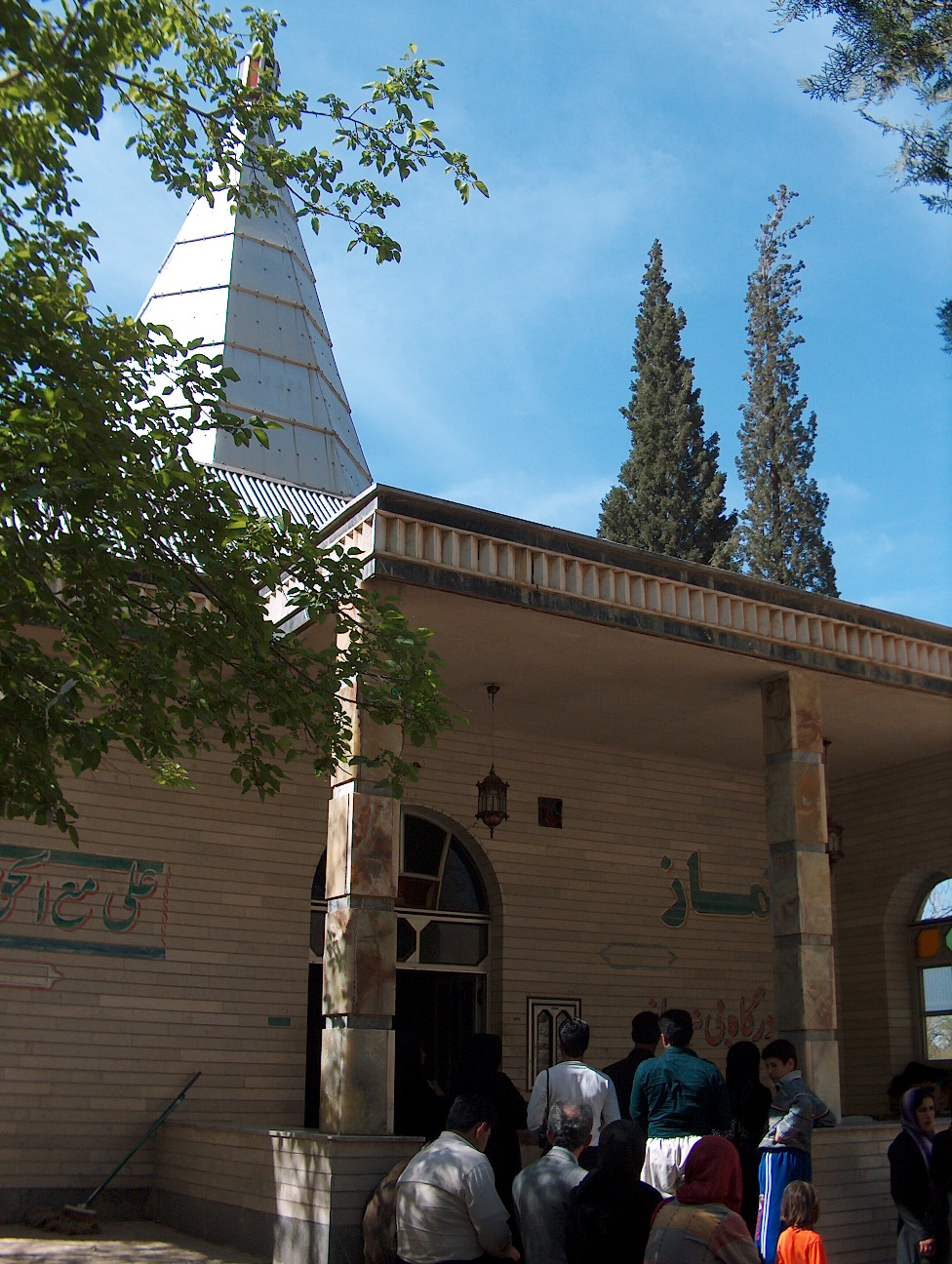
The Tomb of Dawud Koswar in Zardeh, Kermanshah Province, is a sacred shrine in Yarsanism.

Two important sanctuaries of the Yarsani are the Tomb of Bābā Yādgār in Kermanshah Province, Iran, about 40 kilometres (25 mi) away from the provincial capital of Sarpol-e Zahab, as well as the Tomb of Dawud Koswar in Zardeh, about 3 kilometres (1.9 mi) east of Sarpol-e Zahab. Another important shrine is that of Sultan Sahak near the Perdīvar Bridge in Sheykh Hasan, Kermanshah Province. The tombs of Pir Benjamin and Pir Musi in the town of Kerend-e Gharb in Kermanshah Province are also important shrines.

== Demographics ==
In Iran, Yarsanism is practised mostly in the Kurdish provinces of Western Iran. Their population is estimated to be between 500,000 to as high as 3 million.

In Iraq, Yarsainism followers are called Kakais. As per the community estimates there are 75,000 Kakais in Iraq. and they live mostly across northern Iraq. Other estimates by Minority rights group put the population between 110,000 and 250,000. According to a 2019 BBC report, their population in Iraq was once in millions and now it is 200,000.

== Organisation ==
=== Khandans or spiritual houses ===
Yarsanism is organised into spiritual houses or Khandans, seven of which were established at the time of Sultan Sahak, and four afterwards, making eleven Khandans in all. The Khandans were established when, along with the Haft Tan, Sultan Sahak also formed the Haft Tawane, a group of seven holy persons charged with the affairs of the outer world. They were Say-yed Mohammad, Say-yed Abu'l Wafa, Haji Babusi, Mir Sur, Say-yed Mostafa, Sheykh Shahab al-Din, and Sheykh Habib Shah. Each of the Haft Tawane was charged with responsibility for the guidance of a number of followers, and these followers formed the original seven Khandans, namely Shah Ebrahim, Baba Yadegar, Ali Qalandar, Khamush, Mir Sur, Sey-yed Mosaffa, and Hajji Babu Isa. After Sultan Sahak's time another four khandans were established, namely Atesh Bag, Baba Heydar, Zolnour, and Shah Hayas.

Every Yarsani therefore belongs to one specific khandan, which is led by a spiritual leader called a say-yed, to whom each member must swear obedience. The say-yed is the spiritual leader of the community and is normally present during the ceremonies attended by the followers. Say-yeds are the only ones allowed to have full access to the religious texts of Yarsanism, and have traditionally competed with each other to have the largest number of followers. The position of Say-yed is hereditary, being passed down through the generations from the original founders. As the say-yed are considered spiritual 'parents', it is the tradition for them not to marry their followers.

== Relationship with other religious groups ==
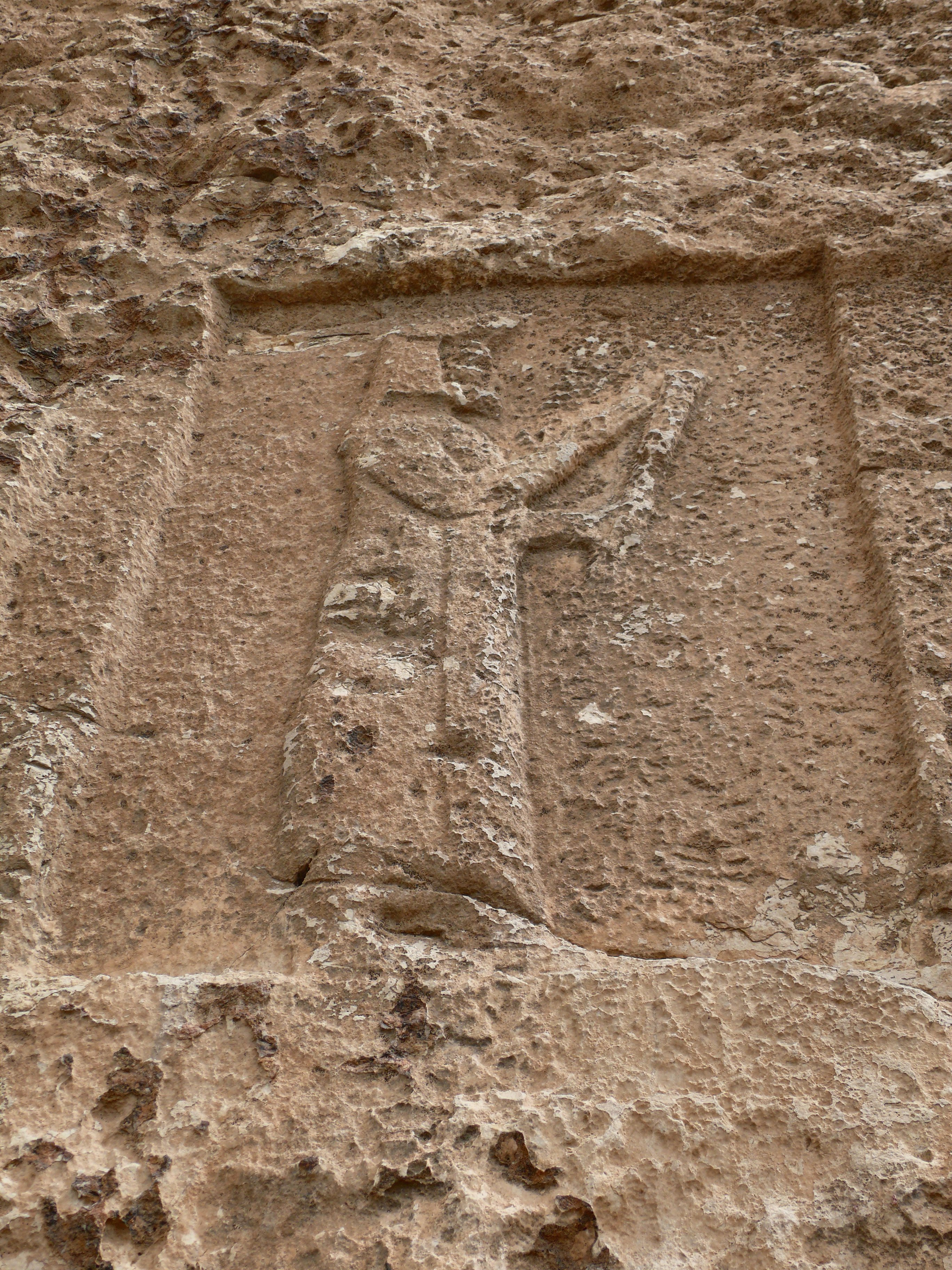
Rock carving at Dukkan-e Davood

An excerpt from the French Review of the Muslim World describes the difficulty in nomenclature for Yarsanism and related Shi'ite mysticism. The English translation reads:

First of all, we must clear up the confusion resulting from the variety of names given to the sect of "Ahlé-Haqq", which are liable to be misunderstood. Like any religion, the one we are dealing with considers itself to be the only true and orthodox one, and it is natural that its adherents give themselves the name of "People of Truth" (Ahlé-Haqq or Ahlé-Haqîqat). This term lacks precision, as other sects, for example the Horoufis, occasionally apply it to themselves. Still, the name Ahlé-Haqq to refer to the sect of our particular interest has every advantage over appellations such as "Gholat", "Alî-Allâhi", and "Noséïri" that the Muslims and most European travellers use in speaking of them. The first term, which encompasses all of the extremist Shi’ites, is too broad and too vague. The second term, "deifiers of Ali", has the same fault and emphasizes what is only a detail in the religious system under discussion. Finally, the name "Noséïri" belongs to that well-defined Syrian religion, which, despite some resemblances with the doctrines of the Ahlé-Haqq (the worship of Ali, the communion, etc.), appears to present a complex of quite different old beliefs.

=== Relations with Islam ===
Ahl-e Haqq view Islam as a product of a cycle of divine essence, which was made manifest in Ali, and established the stage of shari'at (Islamic law). This was followed by the cycle of tariqat (Sufi teachings), then ma'rifat (Sufi gnosis), and finally the current cycle of haqiqat (Ultimate Truth), which was made manifest in Sultan Sahak. The final stage supersedes the previous ones, which frees Ahl-e Haqq from observing the shari'a rules incumbent on Muslims. Ahl-i Haqq class other Muslims as either Ahl-i Tashayyu (followers of Shi'ism) or Ahl-i Tasannun (followers of Sunnism). The Ahl-i Haqq neither observe Muslim rites, such as daily prayers and fasting during the month of Ramadan, nor share Islamic theology and sacred space, such as belief in the Day of Resurrection and sanctity of the mosque.

== Persecution ==
Extremist Sunni Islamic groups, such as the Islamic State of Iraq and the Levant (ISIS) and al-Qaeda, regard the followers of Yarsanism as unbelievers who have to convert to Islam or die. These militants have persecuted Yarsanis during the Iraq conflict, possibly prompting some Iraqi Yarsan community leaders to declare in 2013 that their people were actually Muslims to avoid sectarian attacks. In 2016, after witnessing the massacres committed against the Yazidis, Nezar Kakai formed the Kaka'i Battalion, a 680-strong Peshmerga unit, dedicated to protecting the community and preventing attacks by ISIS.

== See also ==
- Ali-Illahism
- Yazidism
- Yazdânism

== Bibliography ==
- Hamzeh'ee, M. Reza (1990). The Yaresan: a sociological, historical, and religio-historical study of a Kurdish community. Berlin: K. Schwarz. ISBN 3-922968-83-X. OCLC 23438701.
- Kreyenbroek, Philip G.; Kanakis, Yiannis (2020). "God first and last": religious traditions and music of the Yaresan of Guran. Vol. 1: Religious Traditions. Wiesbaden: Harrassowitz Verlag. doi:10.2307/j.ctv1453kqk. ISBN 978-3-447-11424-0. OCLC 1158495389.
- Mir-Hosseini, Z. (May 1994). "Inner Truth and Outer History: The Two Worlds of the Ahl-e Haqq of Kurdistan". International Journal of Middle East Studies. 26 (2). Cambridge University Press: 267–285. doi:10.1017/S0020743800060244.

Collections of Yarsani texts published in Iran and Iraq:

- Ṣafizāde, Ṣ. (1375/1996), Nāme-ye Saranjām yā Kalām-e Xazāne [The Book of Saranjām or the Kalām of the Treasury], Tehran.
- Ḥosseyni, Sayyed M. (1382/2003), Dīwān-e Gewre [The Great Diwan], Kermanshah.
- Ṭāheri, Ṭ. (2007, 2009), Saranjām, 2 Vols., Erbil.
- Anonymous (copied 1387/2008), Daftar-e Diwān-e Gewre-ye Perdiwari [The Book of the Great Collection of Perdiwari (Kalāms)], copied by Kāki ‘Azizpanāhi Tutšāmi, n.pl.
