= Selseleh (tribe) =

Group of tribes in northern Lorestan

The Selseleh (Persian: سلسله) are a collection of tribes living mainly in western Iran, specifically around the Selseleh region in northern Luristan. The tribes speak Luri or Laki, and mostly follow Shia Islam.

== History ==
The tribes of Selseleh were one of the main Lak subdivisions, and lived in the Selseleh region, located north Khorramabad, in the plain of Aleshtar until Nahavand. It included the main tribes of Hasanvand, Yusufvand, Kowlivand, and several more smaller tribes. They traditionally spoke Laki. Minorsky wrote that the tribes of Selseleh formerly lived around Mahidasht before being settled around the plains of Aleshtar in northern Lorestan to support the newly installed Vali dynasty. Oskar Mann and Rabino estimated the Selseleh population at 9,000 families. Minorsky listed the main groups of Lur as the Tarhan, Delfan, Selseleh, and Bala Gariva, and labelled the first three as Lak with the last being truly Lur. Although the Lur tribal divisions (Tarhan, Delfan, Selseleh, and Bala Gariva) were sometimes incorrectly referred to as "confederations", they were geographical divisions.
