= Laki language =

Dialect of the Kurdish language

Laki
- Kurdish: لەکی, Lekî
- Native to: Iran
- Region: Provinces of Hamadan, Ilam, Lorestan and Kermanshah in Iran, and scatteredly elsewhere in Iran
- Ethnicity: Kurds (Lak tribe)
- Native speakers: 680,000 (2021)
- Language family: Indo-European: Indo-Iranian; Iranian; Western Iranian; Northwestern Iranian; Kurdish; Laki
- Writing system: Perso-Arabic script

Language codes
- ISO 639-3: lki
- Glottolog: laki1244
- Linguasphere: 58-AAC-aac

Laki (Kurdish: له‌کی, romanized: Lekî, Persian: لکی) is a language variety that consists of two major sub-varieties: Pish-e Kuh Laki and Posht-e Kuh Laki. Laki is considered a Kurdish dialect by many linguists and is spoken chiefly in the area between Khorramabad and Kermanshah in Iran by about 680,000 native speakers.

== Geography ==
Laki is spoken in Iran and in Turkey. In Iran, the isogloss of Laki spans from Khorramabad to east of Kermanshah, from Holeylan to Harsin. It's the main language in Selseleh, Delfan, Kuhdasht and Khawa counties in Lorestan Province, including Oshtorinan District of Borujerd County, and also around Malayer and Nahavand in Hamadan Province. In Kermanshah Province, it is the main language in Harsin County, Kangavar County, Sahneh County, and in the southern halves of Kermanshah County and Eslamabad-e Gharb County. There are also Laki enclaves in Khorasan, Kerman and around 100,000 speakers in 70 villages around Kelardasht in Mazandaran. In Gilan province, Laki is spoken by around 1,500 people.

In Turkey, the language is spoken by the Şêxbizin tribe, scattered around the country.

== Classification ==
Most scholars agree that Laki is part of the Kurdish language group, yet the classification of Laki as a sub-dialect of Southern Kurdish or as a fourth dialect of Kurdish is unsettled. While differences between Laki and the other Southern Kurdish dialects are minimal, linguist Fattah argues that Laki cannot be considered a dialect of Southern Kurdish since Laki is ergative unlike Southern Kurdish. Other linguists argue that Laki is closely related to Kurdish but refrain from deciding its place among the Northwestern Iranian languages. Glottolog places Laki alongside the three Kurdish languages into a Laki-Kurdish group, while Ethnologue likewise lists Laki as a fourth language within Kurdish.

Laki has also been classified as a Luri dialect, but speakers of Luri claim that Laki is "difficult or impossible to understand". Linguist Shahsavari points that Laki is sometimes seen as 'a transitional dialect between Kurdish and Luri'.

== History ==
=== Oral literature ===
Two significant groups of Laki oral literature are religious oral literature and astronomical literature. The first group includes Shia oral hymns and Yarsan songs, while the second gives an expansive and colorful account of Laki narratives of astronomical events and their consequences, the power of the sun, moon, the week and tales on the stars. A third and less significant group of Laki oral literature are verses on nature and the daily life. In the folklore of rural areas, fal gərtən or 'tell fortunes' are very important.

=== Written literature ===
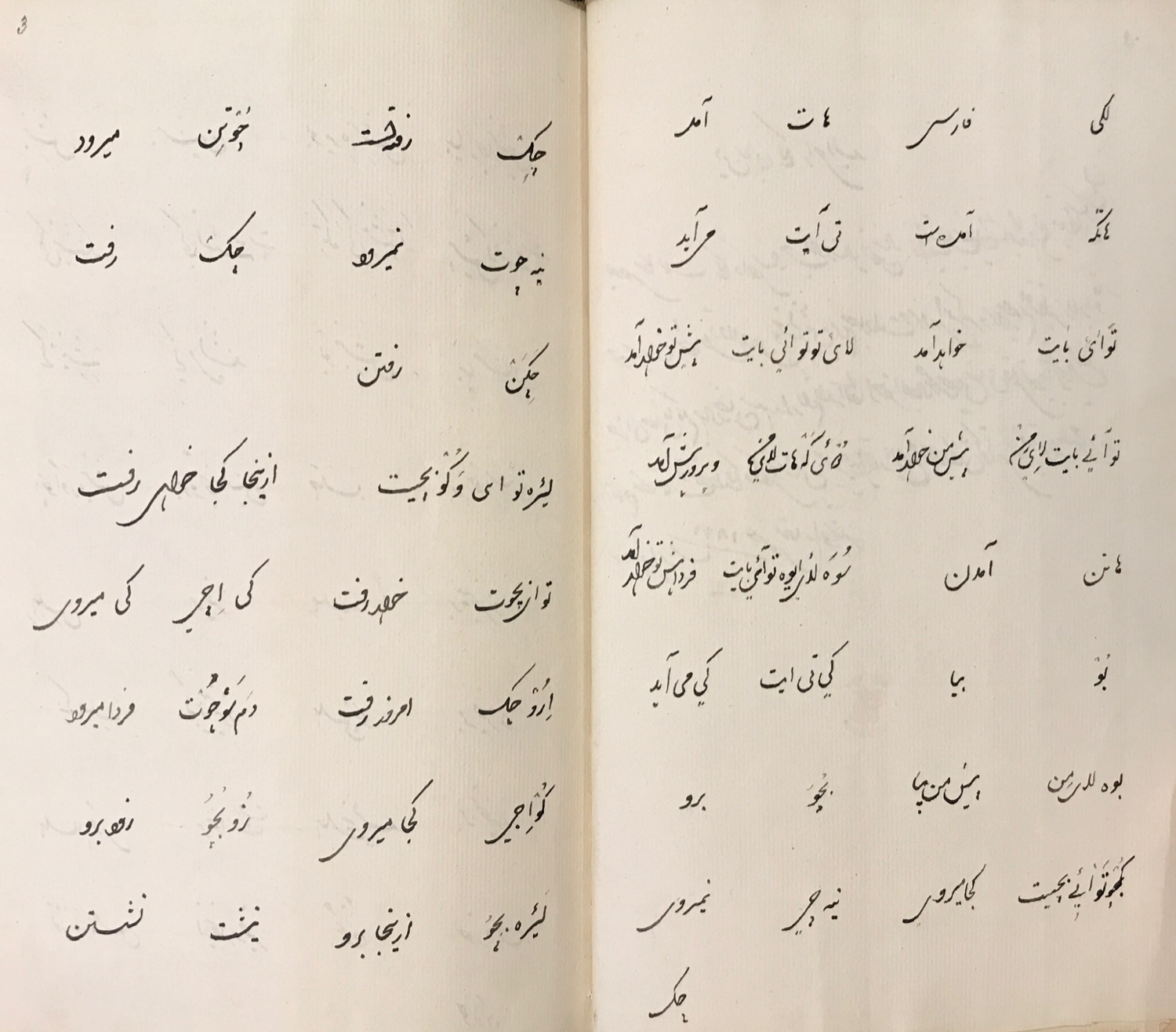
Page of a Persian–Laki dictionary, dated 1811 CE.

The use of Laki in literary writing is a more recent phenomenon and has therefore not been considerably developed. Historically, the use was impeded by the status of Gorani as koiné among Kurds which meant that speakers of Laki wrote their poetry in Gorani. Nonetheless, some early Laki works include the quatrain al-shi'r bi-l-fahlawīya (year 716 in hijri) which was preserved in a 14th-century manuscript, and Jang-i Hamawan which was a freely adapted Laki version of the Shahnameh by Ferdowsi. Mele Perîşan (1356–1431) also wrote his diwan in Gorani influenced by Laki.

The most well-known manzuma in Laki is Darcenge written by Sayid Nushad Abu al-Wafa'i, a fellow of Sultan Sahak and contemporary of Nader Shah. The Darcenge contained questions concerning the events taking place in the world with sophisticated answers. This period also saw many Laki versions of the Kalâm-e Saranjâm.

In addition, there are many manuscripts titled Kule bad meaning 'the continuous wind' scattered around the region. These manuscripts appeared numerously in the late 16th century and early 17th century and were used to express benediction on nature and to request a wind which was appropriate for agricultural reasons. Important names from the 18th to the 20th century include Najaf Kalhuri (1739–1799), Tirkamir (d. 1815), Yaqub Maydashti, Mila Manuchichr Kuliwand and Mila Haqq Ali Siyahpush.

== Laki phonology ==
The phonology of Laki is identical to that of other Southern Kurdish dialects, which diverges from Kurmanji and Sorani by also having the /øː/, /oː/ and /ʉː/.

Vowel phonemes
	Front		Central	Back	
	unrounded	rounded	Central	unrounded	rounded
Close	iː		ʉ ɨ		ʊ uː
Close-mid	eː	øː			o oː
Open-mid	ɛ				
Open	a			ɑː	

== Comparison of cognates ==
English	Laki	Kurmanji Kurdish	Khorramabadi Luri
salt	xöwa	xwê	nəmak
oil	rîm	rûn	reğo
fire	agör	agir	taš
go	sî, re	çû	ra
come	hewt, hat	hat	ōma
fall	ket	ket	oftā
say	vöt, gôt	got	got
hungry	vörsönî, versörnî	birçî	gosna
here	îre	vir	īčö
there	ûre	wir	ūčö

== Bibliography ==
- Ahmadzadeh, Hashem (2021), "From the Wandering Poets to the Stateless Novelists: A Short Introduction to Kurdish Literary History", in Bozarslan, Hamit (ed.), The Cambridge History of the Kurds, Oxford University Press, ISBN 9781108473354
- Anonby, Erik John (2003), "Update on Luri: How many languages?" (PDF), Journal of the Royal Asiatic Society of Great Britain & Ireland, 13 (2): 180, doi:10.1017/S1356186303003067, S2CID 162293895, archived from the original (PDF) on 6 October 2018
- Anonby, Erik John (2004), Kurdish or Luri? Laki's disputed identity in the Luristan province of Iran, CiteSeerX 10.1.1.621.4714
- Anonby, Erik John (2021), "Atlas of the Languages of Iran A working classification", Languages of Iran
- Belelli, Sara (2021). "The Laki variety of Harsin". Bamberg Studies in Kurdish Linguistics. University of Bamberg Press.
- Dehqan, Mustafa (2008), "Zîn-ə Hördemîr: A Lekî Satirical Verse from Lekistan", Journal of the Royal Asiatic Society, 18 (3), Cambridge University Press: 295–309, doi:10.1017/S1356186308008523, S2CID 163008614
- Dehqan, Mustafa (2016), "A Kurdish Poem by Sayyid Ya'qūb Māydashtī", Nûbihar
- Department of Studies and Planning of Lorestan Province, سیمای عشایر استان لرستان (PDF) (in Persian), تهیه وتنظیم : اداره مطالعات وبرنامه ریزی, archived from the original (PDF) on 20 April 2021
- Dr. Mikaîlî (2020), "Îskana kurdên şexbezenî (şêxbizin) li Anatolîyê" (PDF), Bîrnebûn (in Kurdish) (76), ISSN 1402-7488, archived from the original (PDF) on 2020-10-18
- Fattah, Ismaïl Kamandâr (2000), Les dialectes Kurdes méridionaux, Acta Iranica, ISBN 9042909188
- Hamzeh’ee, M. Rezaa (2009), Lak Tribe, Iranica Online
- Hamzeh’ee, M. Rezaa (1990), The Yaresan: A Sociological, Historical and Religio-historical Study of a Kurdish Community, K. Schwarz, ISBN 9783922968832
- Mirdehghan, Mahinnaz; Moradkhani, Simin (2010), "Personal Pronouns in the Kakavandi Laki Dialect of Harsin (Kermanshah, Iran)", Iranian Studies, 43 (4): 513–531, doi:10.1080/00210862.2010.495569, S2CID 162366860
- Schmitt, Rüdiger (2000), Die iranischen Sprachen in Gegenwart und Geschichte (in German), 200, ISBN 3895001503
- Shahsavari, Faramarz (2010), "Lakī and Kurdish*", Iran & the Caucasus, 14 (1): 79–82, doi:10.1163/157338410X12743419189423
- Vajehyab, لکی (in Persian)
- Windfuhr, Gernot (2009), The Iranian Languages, London & New York: Routledge, ISBN 978-0-7007-1 131-4
