= Seyyed Mohammad, Chaharmahal and Bakhtiari =

Seyyed Mohammad سيدمحمد
- Village
- Location within Iran
- Coordinates: 31°37′48″N 50°39′58″E
- Country: Iran
- Province: Chaharmahal and Bakhtiari
- County: Lordegan
- Bakhsh: Manj
- Rural District: Manj

Population (2006)
  - Total: 606
- Time zone: UTC+3:30 (IRST)
  - Summer (DST): UTC+4:30 (IRDT)

Seyyed Mohammad (Persian: سيدمحمد, also Romanized as Seyyed Moḩammad; also known as Emāmzādeh Seyyed Moḩammad) is a village in Manj Rural District, Manj District, Lordegan County, Chaharmahal and Bakhtiari Province, Iran. At the 2006 census, its population was 606, in 109 families.
