= Bivanij Rural District =

Rural district in Kermanshah province, Iran

Bivanij Rural District Persian: دهستان بيونيج
- Rural District
- Location within Iran
- Coordinates: 34°24′30″N 46°10′40″E
- Country: Iran
- Province: Kermanshah
- County: Dalahu
- District: Central
- Capital: Deh-e Jami

Population (2016)
  - Total: 1,036
- Time zone: UTC+3:30 (IRST)

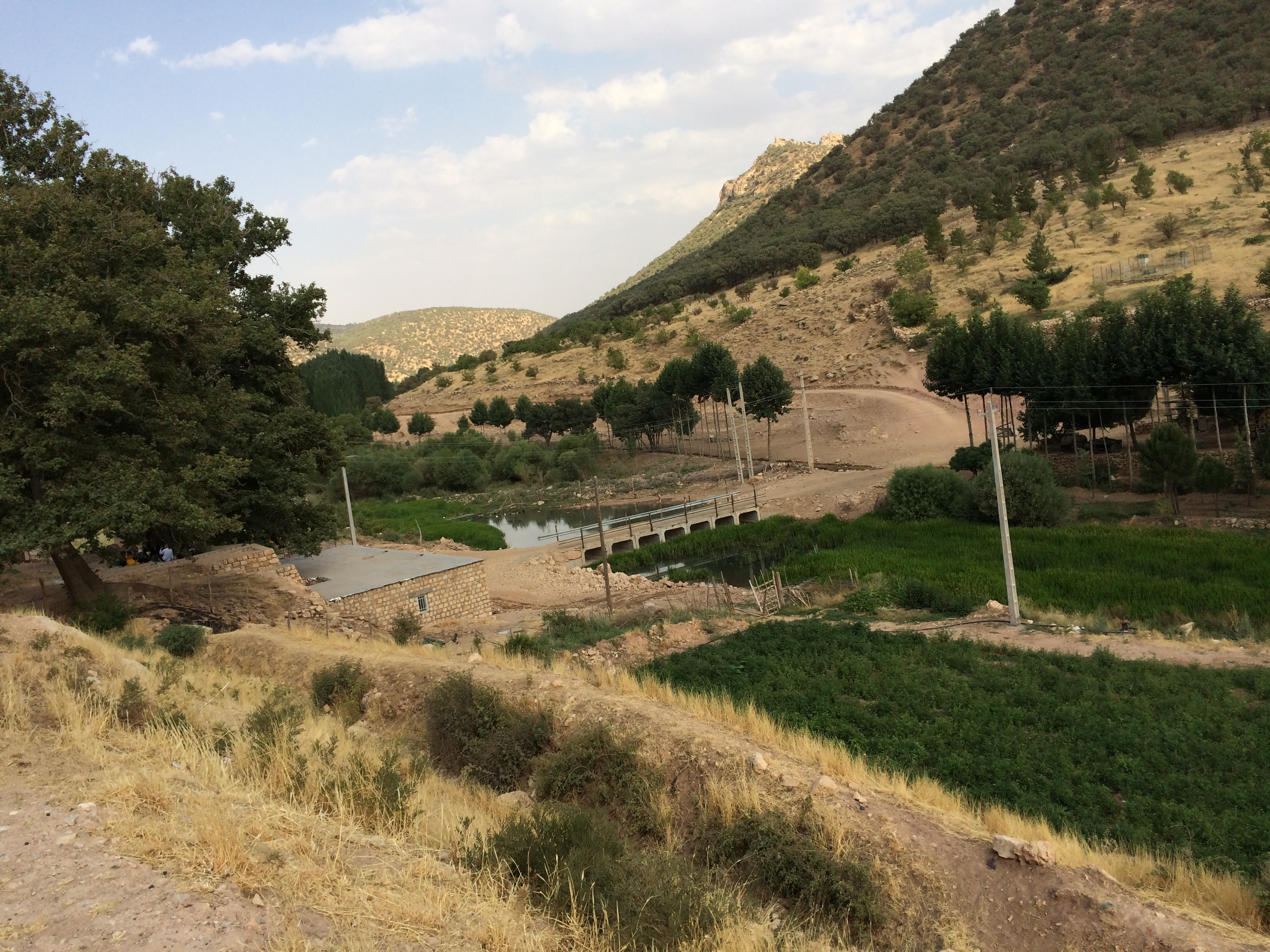

Bivanij Rural District (Persian: دهستان بيونيج) is in the Central District of Dalahu County, Kermanshah province, Iran. Its capital is the village of Deh-e Jami.

== Demographics ==
=== Population ===
At the time of the 2006 National Census, the rural district's population was 1,458 in 323 households. There were 1,208 inhabitants in 321 households at the following census of 2011. The 2016 census measured the population of the rural district as 1,036 in 316 households. The most populous of its 20 villages was Deh-e Jami, with 209 people.
