= Ban Zardeh Rural District =

Rural district in Kermanshah province, Iran

Ban Zardeh Rural District Persian: دهستان بان زرده
- Rural District
- Location within Iran
- Coordinates: 34°30′35″N 45°59′41″E
- Country: Iran
- Province: Kermanshah
- County: Dalahu
- District: Central
- Capital: Rizhaw

Population (2016)
  - Total: 3,212
- Time zone: UTC+3:30 (IRST)

Ban Zardeh Rural District (Persian: دهستان بان زرده) is in the Central District of Dalahu County, Kermanshah province, Iran. It is administered from the city of Rizhaw. (Note: Formerly the village of Shahrak-e Rijab)

== Demographics ==
=== Population ===
At the time of the 2006 National Census, the rural district's population was 6,700 in 1,416 households. There were 7,017 inhabitants in 1,744 households at the following census of 2011. The 2016 census measured the population of the rural district as 3,212 in 878 households. The most populous of its 10 villages was Zardeh, with 1,087 people.
