= Howmeh-ye Kerend Rural District =

Rural district in Kermanshah province, Iran

Howmeh-ye Kerend Rural District Persian: دهستان حومه كرند
- Rural District
- Location within Iran
- Coordinates: 34°18′24″N 46°12′55″E
- Country: Iran
- Province: Kermanshah
- County: Dalahu
- District: Central
- Capital: Telesm

Population (2016)
  - Total: 4,262
- Time zone: UTC+3:30 (IRST)

Howmeh-ye Kerend Rural District (Persian: دهستان حومه كرند) is in the Central District of Dalahu County, Kermanshah province, Iran. Its capital is the village of Telesm.

== Demographics ==
=== Population ===
At the time of the 2006 National Census, the rural district's population was 5,682 in 1,285 households. There were 5,205 inhabitants in 1,296 households at the following census of 2011. The 2016 census measured the population of the rural district as 4,262 in 1,177 households. The most populous of its 33 villages was Gav Sur, with 768 people.
