= Central District (Dalahu County) =

District in Kermanshah province, Iran

Central District (Dalahu County) Persian: بخش مرکزی شهرستان دالاهو
- District
- Location within Iran
- Coordinates: 34°21′10″N 46°09′56″E
- Country: Iran
- Province: Kermanshah
- County: Dalahu
- Capital: Kerend-e Gharb

Population (2016)
  - Total: 20,215
- Time zone: UTC+3:30 (IRST)

The Central District of Dalahu County (Persian: بخش مرکزی شهرستان دالاهو) is in Kermanshah province, Iran. Its capital is the city of Kerend-e Gharb.

== History ==
After the 2011 National Census, the village of Shahrak-e Rijab, after merging with several other villages, was elevated to city status as Rizhaw.

== Demographics ==
=== Population ===
At the time of the 2006 census, the district's population was 21,734 in 5,065 households. The following census in 2011 counted 21,741 people in 5,720 households. The 2016 census measured the population of the district as 20,215 inhabitants in 5,828 households.

=== Administrative divisions ===
Central District (Dalahu County) Population
Administrative Divisions	2006	2011	2016
Ban Zardeh RD	6,700	7,017	3,212
Bivanij RD	1,458	1,208	1,036
Howmeh-ye Kerend RD	5,682	5,205	4,262
Kerend-e Gharb (city)	7,894	8,311	7,798
Rizhaw (city) (Note: Formerly the village of Shahrak-e Rijab)			3,907
Total	21,734	21,741	20,215
RD = Rural District
