= Shahmar =

Shahmar or Shah Mar (Persian: شاه مار) may refer to:

== Given name ==
- Shahmar Alakbarov (1943–1992), Azerbaijani actor
- Shahmar Movsumov (born 1972), Azerbaijani government official

== Places ==
- Shahmar Beyglu, Ardabil province
- Shahmar, East Azerbaijan
- Shahmar-e Baba Morad, Dalahu County, Kermanshah province
- Shahmar-e Mirza Morad, Dalahu County, Kermanshah province
- Shahmar, Gilan-e Gharb, Kermanshah province
- Shah Mar, Sahneh, Kermanshah province
