= Takhtgah =

Takhtgah or Takhtegah (Persian: تختگاه) may refer to:

- Takhtgah-e Hoseyn Soltan
- Takhtgah-e Jahan Bakhsh
- Takhtgah-e Safi Yar Soltan
- Takhtgah-e Surat Khanom

== See also ==
- Sar Takhtgah
