= Bansulab =

Bansulab (Persian: بان سولاب) may refer to:

- Bansulab-e Hattem
- Bansulab-e Kalbali
- Bansulab-e Nam Khas
- Bansulab-e Shir Mohammad
- Bansulab-e Shirzad
