= Gura Jub =

Gura Jub (Persian: گوراجوب) may refer to:

- Gura Jub-e Baba Karam
- Gura Jub-e Morad Beyg
- Gura Jub-e Qeshlaq
- Gura Jub-e Zeyyed Ali
