= Banyaran =

Banyaran or Baniaran or Ban Yaran (Persian: بان ياران) may refer to:

- Banyaran-e Amir Haqmorad
- Banyaran-e Aziz Morad
- Banyaran-e Mirza Hoseyn
- Banyaran-e Teymur
