= Qaleh Qazi =

Qaleh Qazi or Qaleh-ye Qazi or Qaleh-i-Qazi (Persian: قلعه قاضي), also rendered as Ghaleh Ghazi, may refer to various places in Iran:

- Qaleh Qazi, East Azerbaijan
- Qaleh Qazi, Hamadan
- Qaleh Qazi, Hormozgan
- Qaleh-ye Qazi, Kerman
- Qaleh Qazi-ye Olya, Kermanshah Province
- Qaleh Qazi-ye Sofla, Kermanshah Province
- Qaleh-ye Qazi, Khuzestan
- Qaleh Qazi District, in Hormozgan Province
- Qaleh Qazi Rural District, in Hormozgan Province
