= Kaneh Rashid =

Kaneh Rashid (Persian: كنه رشيد) may refer to:

- Kaneh Rashid-e Allah Feqid
- Kaneh Rashid-e Arab
- Kaneh Rashid-e Babakhan
- Kaneh Rashid-e Gol Morad
