= Dareh Rash-e Mohammad Soltan =

Dareh Rash-e Mohammad Soltan داره رش محمدسلطان
- Village
- Location within Iran
- Coordinates: 34°31′54″N 46°17′49″E
- Country: Iran
- Province: Kermanshah
- County: Dalahu
- Bakhsh: Gahvareh
- Rural District: Qalkhani

Population (2006)
  - Total: 251
- Time zone: UTC+3:30 (IRST)
  - Summer (DST): UTC+4:30 (IRDT)

Dareh Rash-e Mohammad Soltan (Persian: داره رش محمدسلطان, also Romanized as Dāreh Rash-e Moḩammad Solṭān; also known as Dāreh Rash, Dāreh Rashī, Dār-e Rash, Dār Rash, Darreh Rashīd, and Darreh-ye Rashīd) is a village in Qalkhani Rural District, Gahvareh District, Dalahu County, Kermanshah Province, Iran. At the 2006 census, its population was 251, in 49 families.
