= Gol Anjir =

Gol Anjir گل انجير
- Village
- Location within Iran
- Coordinates: 34°29′08″N 46°23′29″E
- Country: Iran
- Province: Kermanshah
- County: Dalahu
- Bakhsh: Gahvareh
- Rural District: Gurani

Population (2006)
  - Total: 102
- Time zone: UTC+3:30 (IRST)
  - Summer (DST): UTC+4:30 (IRDT)

Gol Anjir (Persian: گل انجير, also Romanized as Gol Anjīr) is a village in Gurani Rural District, Gahvareh District, Dalahu County, Kermanshah Province, Iran. At the 2006 census, its population was 102, in 22 families.
