= Chalab-e Qatakeh Bares =

Chalab-e Qatakeh Bares چالاب قتكه بارس
- Village
- Country: Iran
- Province: Kermanshah
- County: Dalahu
- Bakhsh: Gahvareh
- Rural District: Qalkhani

Population (2006)
  - Total: 34
- Time zone: UTC+3:30 (IRST)
  - Summer (DST): UTC+4:30 (IRDT)

Chalab-e Qatakeh Bares (Persian: چالاب قتكه بارس, also Romanized as Chālāb-e Qatakeh Bāres) is a village in Qalkhani Rural District, Gahvareh District, Dalahu County, Kermanshah Province, Iran. At the 2006 census, its population was 34, in 6 families.
