= Sar Takht =

Sar Takht or Sartakht or Sar-e Takht (Persian: سرتخت) may refer to:

- Sar Takht, Isfahan
- Sar Takht, Shahr-e Babak, Kerman Province
- Sartakht, Zarand, Kerman Province
- Sar Takht, Kermanshah
- Sar Takht-e Do Rahan, Khuzestan Province
- Sar Takht, Lorestan
- Sar Takht, Semnan

== See also ==
- Sar Takhtgah
