= Qaleh Dumi Zar =

Qaleh Dumi Zar قلعه دومي زر
- Village
- Country: Iran
- Province: Kermanshah
- County: Dalahu
- Bakhsh: Gahvareh
- Rural District: Qalkhani

Population (2006)
  - Total: 62
- Time zone: UTC+3:30 (IRST)
  - Summer (DST): UTC+4:30 (IRDT)

Qaleh Dumi Zar (Persian: قلعه دومي زر, also Romanized as Qal‘eh Dūmī Zar) is a village in Qalkhani Rural District, Gahvareh District, Dalahu County, Kermanshah Province, Iran. At the 2006 census, its population was 62, in 11 families.
