= Beryah Khani =

Beryah Khani بريه خاني
- Village
- Location within Iran
- Coordinates: 34°17′16″N 46°24′00″E
- Country: Iran
- Province: Kermanshah
- County: Dalahu
- Bakhsh: Gahvareh
- Rural District: Gurani

Population (2006)
  - Total: 211
- Time zone: UTC+3:30 (IRST)
  - Summer (DST): UTC+4:30 (IRDT)

Beryah Khani (Persian: بريه خاني, also Romanized as Beryah Khānī and Beryeh Khānī; also known as Beryā Khānī, Būrīākhānī, and Būryā Khānī) is a village in Gurani Rural District, Gahvareh District, Dalahu County, Kermanshah Province, Iran. At the 2006 census, its population was 211, in 40 families.
