= Darvit =

Darvit درويت
- Village
- Location within Iran
- Coordinates: 34°25′40″N 46°17′19″E
- Country: Iran
- Province: Kermanshah
- County: Dalahu
- Bakhsh: Gahvareh
- Rural District: Qalkhani

Population (2006)
  - Total: 304
- Time zone: UTC+3:30 (IRST)
  - Summer (DST): UTC+4:30 (IRDT)

Darvit (Persian: درويت, also Romanized as Darvīt; also known as Darvīd) is a village in Qalkhani Rural District, Gahvareh District, Dalahu County, Kermanshah Province, Iran. At the 2006 census, its population was 304, in 66 families.
