= Darreh Nijeh =

Darreh Nijeh دره نيجه
- Village
- Location within Iran
- Coordinates: 34°26′45″N 46°16′15″E
- Country: Iran
- Province: Kermanshah
- County: Dalahu
- Bakhsh: Gahvareh
- Rural District: Qalkhani

Population (2006)
  - Total: 57
- Time zone: UTC+3:30 (IRST)
  - Summer (DST): UTC+4:30 (IRDT)

Darreh Nijeh (Persian: دره نيجه, also Romanized as Darreh Nījeh) is a village in Qalkhani Rural District, Gahvareh District, Dalahu County, Kermanshah Province, Iran. At the 2006 census, its population was 57 people, in 13 families.
