= Movali Najaf Chalaveh =

Movali Najaf Chalaveh موالي نجف چالاوه
- Village
- Country: Iran
- Province: Kermanshah
- County: Dalahu
- Bakhsh: Gahvareh
- Rural District: Qalkhani

Population (2006)
  - Total: 195
- Time zone: UTC+3:30 (IRST)
  - Summer (DST): UTC+4:30 (IRDT)

Movali Najaf Chalaveh (Persian: موالي نجف چالاوه, also Romanized as Movālī Najaf Chālāveh) is a village in Qalkhani Rural District, Gahvareh District, Dalahu County, Kermanshah Province, Iran. At the 2006 census, its population was 195, in 42 families.
