= Jamasab =

Jamasab جاماسب
- Village
- Location within Iran
- Coordinates: 34°27′55″N 46°23′08″E
- Country: Iran
- Province: Kermanshah
- County: Dalahu
- Bakhsh: Gahvareh
- Rural District: Gurani

Population (2006)
  - Total: 57
- Time zone: UTC+3:30 (IRST)
  - Summer (DST): UTC+4:30 (IRDT)

Jamasab (Persian: جاماسب, also Romanized as Jāmāsab) is a village in Gurani Rural District, Gahvareh District, Dalahu County, Kermanshah Province, Iran. At the 2006 census, its population was 57, in 14 families.
