= Rukovan =

Rukovan روكوان
- Village
- Location within Iran
- Coordinates: 34°26′18″N 46°25′47″E
- Country: Iran
- Province: Kermanshah
- County: Dalahu
- Bakhsh: Gahvareh
- Rural District: Gurani

Population (2006)
  - Total: 43
- Time zone: UTC+3:30 (IRST)
  - Summer (DST): UTC+4:333 (IRDT)

Rukovan (Persian: روكوان, also Romanized as Rūkovān) is a village in Gurani Rural District, Gahvareh District, Dalahu County, Kermanshah Province, Iran. At the 2006 census, its population was 43, in 9 families.
