= Dangeh-ye Khodayar =

Dangeh-ye Khodayar دنگه خدايار
- Village
- Country: Iran
- Province: Kermanshah
- County: Dalahu
- Bakhsh: Gahvareh
- Rural District: Qalkhani

Population (2006)
  - Total: 55
- Time zone: UTC+3:30 (IRST)
  - Summer (DST): UTC+4:30 (IRDT)

Dangeh-ye Khodayar (Persian: دنگه خدايار, also Romanized as Dangeh-ye Khodāyār) is a village in Qalkhani Rural District, Gahvareh District, Dalahu County, Kermanshah Province, Iran. At the 2006 census, its population was 55, in 10 families.
