= Kelineh-ye Paydar =

Kelineh-ye Paydar كلينه پايدار
- Village
- Location within Iran
- Coordinates: 34°30′27″N 46°25′32″E
- Country: Iran
- Province: Kermanshah
- County: Dalahu
- Bakhsh: Gahvareh
- Rural District: Gurani

Population (2006)
  - Total: 112
- Time zone: UTC+3:30 (IRST)
  - Summer (DST): UTC+4:30 (IRDT)

Kelineh-ye Paydar (Persian: كلينه پايدار, also Romanized as Kelīneh-ye Paydār and Kelīneh-ye Pāydār) is a village in Gurani Rural District, Gahvareh District, Dalahu County, Kermanshah Province, Iran. At the 2006 census, its population was 112, in 27 families.
