= Ali Barani =

Ali Barani علي باراني
- Village
- Location within Iran
- Coordinates: 34°28′44″N 46°17′07″E
- Country: Iran
- Province: Kermanshah
- County: Dalahu
- Bakhsh: Gahvareh
- Rural District: Qalkhani

Population (2006)
  - Total: 223
- Time zone: UTC+3:30 (IRST)
  - Summer (DST): UTC+4:30 (IRDT)

Ali Barani (Persian: علي باراني, also Romanized as ‘Alī Bārānī) is a village in Qalkhani Rural District, Gahvareh District, Dalahu County, Kermanshah Province, Iran. At the 2006 census, its population was 223, in 41 families.
