= Shavil-e Sadeq Khan =

Shavil-e Sadeq Khan شويل صادق خان
- Village
- Location within Iran
- Coordinates: 34°34′36″N 46°14′09″E
- Country: Iran
- Province: Kermanshah
- County: Dalahu
- Bakhsh: Gahvareh
- Rural District: Qalkhani

Population (2006)
  - Total: 179
- Time zone: UTC+3:30 (IRST)
  - Summer (DST): UTC+4:30 (IRDT)

Shavil-e Sadeq Khan (Persian: شويل صادق خان, also Romanized as Shavīl-e Şādeq Khān; also known as Shavīl) is a village in Qalkhani Rural District, Gahvareh District, Dalahu County, Kermanshah Province, Iran. At the 2006 census, its population was 179, in 41 families.
