= Baba Shah Ahmad =

Baba Shah Ahmad باوەشامە – Bawe Şame
- Village
- Location within Iran
- Coordinates: 34°21′05″N 46°23′15″E
- Country: Iran
- Province: Kermanshah
- County: Dalahu
- Bakhsh: Gahvareh
- Rural District: Gurani

Population (2006)
  - Total: 122
- Time zone: UTC+3:30 (IRST)
  - Summer (DST): UTC+4:30 (IRDT)

Baba Shah Ahmad (Kurdish: باوەشام, Bawe Şame, Persian: باباشاه احمد, also Romanized as Bābā Shāh Aḩmad) is a village in Gurani Rural District, Gahvareh District, Dalahu County, Kermanshah province, Iran. At the 2006 census, its population was 122, in 29 families.

== Religious Significance ==
Baba Shah Ahmad (Bawe Şame) is one of the holy places of the Yarsan followers.
