= Alikeh =

Alikeh عليكه
- Village
- Location within Iran
- Coordinates: 34°26′25″N 46°24′05″E
- Country: Iran
- Province: Kermanshah
- County: Dalahu
- Bakhsh: Gahvareh
- Rural District: Gurani

Population (2006)
  - Total: 81
- Time zone: UTC+3:30 (IRST)
  - Summer (DST): UTC+4:30 (IRDT)

Alikeh (Persian: عليكه, also Romanized as ‘Alīkeh; also known as ‘Alīgeh) is a village in Gurani Rural District, Gahvareh District, Dalahu County, Kermanshah Province, Iran. At the 2006 census, its population was 81, in 19 families.
