= Biameh-ye Sofla =

Biameh-ye Sofla بيامه سفلي
- Village
- Location within Iran
- Coordinates: 34°30′17″N 46°15′35″E
- Country: Iran
- Province: Kermanshah
- County: Dalahu
- Bakhsh: Gahvareh
- Rural District: Qalkhani

Population (2006)
  - Total: 403
- Time zone: UTC+3:30 (IRST)
  - Summer (DST): UTC+4:30 (IRDT)

Biameh-ye Sofla (Persian: بيامه سفلي, also Romanized as Bīāmeh-ye Soflá; also known as Beyāmeh-ye Soflá) is a village in Qalkhani Rural District, Gahvareh District, Dalahu County, Kermanshah Province, Iran. At the 2006 census, its population was 403, in 87 families.
