= Bi Mush =

Bi Mush بيموش
- Village
- Location within Iran
- Coordinates: 34°24′30″N 46°20′30″E
- Country: Iran
- Province: Kermanshah
- County: Dalahu
- Bakhsh: Gahvareh
- Rural District: Gurani

Population (2006)
  - Total: 295
- Time zone: UTC+3:30 (IRST)
  - Summer (DST): UTC+4:30 (IRDT)

Bi Mush (Persian: بيموش, also Romanized as Bī Mūsh) is a village in Gurani Rural District, Gahvareh District, Dalahu County, Kermanshah Province, Iran. At the 2006 census, its population was 295, in 62 families.
