= Baravand =

Baravand or Barevand (Persian: بروند) may refer to:

- Baravand, Hamadan
- Baravand-e Barishah, Kermanshah Province
- Baravand-e Olya, Kermanshah Province
- Baravand-e Sofla, Kermanshah Province
