= Choqa Chubin =

Choqa Chubin چقاچوبين
- Village
- Location within Iran
- Coordinates: 34°23′16″N 46°20′32″E
- Country: Iran
- Province: Kermanshah
- County: Dalahu
- Bakhsh: Gahvareh
- Rural District: Gurani

Population (2006)
  - Total: 231
- Time zone: UTC+3:30 (IRST)
  - Summer (DST): UTC+4:30 (IRDT)

Choqa Chubin (Persian: چقاچوبين, also Romanized as Choqā Chūbīn; also known as Choghā Chūbīn) is a village in Gurani Rural District, Gahvareh District, Dalahu County, Kermanshah Province, Iran. At the 2006 census, its population was 231, in 48 families.
