= Gerdekan Kureh =

Gerdekan Kureh گردكان كوره
- Village
- Location within Iran
- Coordinates: 34°38′00″N 46°12′00″E
- Country: Iran
- Province: Kermanshah
- County: Dalahu
- Bakhsh: Gahvareh
- Rural District: Qalkhani

Population (2006)
  - Total: 297
- Time zone: UTC+3:30 (IRST)
  - Summer (DST): UTC+4:30 (IRDT)

Gerdekan Kureh (Persian: گردكان كوره, also Romanized as Gerdekān Kūreh; also known as Gerdekānkūr-e Shahbāz) is a village in Qalkhani Rural District, Gahvareh District, Dalahu County, Kermanshah Province, Iran. At the 2006 census, its population was 297, in 54 families.
