= Biameh-ye Olya =

Biameh-ye Olya بيامه عليا
- Village
- Location within Iran
- Coordinates: 34°30′53″N 46°14′35″E
- Country: Iran
- Province: Kermanshah
- County: Dalahu
- Bakhsh: Gahvareh
- Rural District: Qalkhani

Population (2006)
  - Total: 187
- Time zone: UTC+3:30 (IRST)
  - Summer (DST): UTC+4:30 (IRDT)

Biameh-ye Olya (Persian: بيامه عليا, also Romanized as Bīāmeh-ye ‘Olyā; also known as Beyāmeh-ye ‘Olyā and Bīāmeh-ye Bālā) is a village in Qalkhani Rural District, Gahvareh District, Dalahu County, Kermanshah Province, Iran. At the 2006 census, its population was 187, in 42 families.
