= Meleh Yaqub =

Meleh Yaqub مله يعقوب
- Village
- Location within Iran
- Coordinates: 34°27′10″N 46°19′23″E
- Country: Iran
- Province: Kermanshah
- County: Dalahu
- Bakhsh: Gahvareh
- Rural District: Qalkhani

Population (2006)
  - Total: 69
- Time zone: UTC+3:30 (IRST)
  - Summer (DST): UTC+4:30 (IRDT)

Meleh Yaqub (Persian: مله يعقوب, also Romanized as Meleh Ya‘qūb; also known as Kāvālī Bānyāran-e Yār Moḩammad and Mollā Ya‘qūb) is a village in Qalkhani Rural District, Gahvareh District, Dalahu County, Kermanshah Province, Iran. At the 2006 census, its population was 69, in 19 families.
