= Biraqavand =

Biraqavand بيراق وند
- Village
- Location within Iran
- Coordinates: 34°33′26″N 46°21′31″E
- Country: Iran
- Province: Kermanshah
- County: Dalahu
- Bakhsh: Gahvareh
- Rural District: Qalkhani

Population (2006)
  - Total: 536
- Time zone: UTC+3:30 (IRST)
  - Summer (DST): UTC+4:30 (IRDT)

Biraqavand (Persian: بيراق وند, also Romanized as Bīrāqavand; also known as Bīdāghvand and Bīrqavand) is a village in Qalkhani Rural District, Gahvareh District, Dalahu County, Kermanshah Province, Iran. At the 2006 census, its population was 536, in 120 families.
