= Gur-e Gavarz =

Gur-e Gavarz گورگاورز
- Village
- Location within Iran
- Coordinates: 34°27′49″N 46°17′18″E
- Country: Iran
- Province: Kermanshah
- County: Dalahu
- Bakhsh: Gahvareh
- Rural District: Qalkhani

Population (2006)
  - Total: 159
- Time zone: UTC+3:30 (IRST)
  - Summer (DST): UTC+4:30 (IRDT)

Gur-e Gavarz (Persian: گورگاورز, also Romanized as Gūr-e Gāvarz) is a village in Qalkhani Rural District, Gahvareh District, Dalahu County, Kermanshah Province, Iran. At the 2006 census, its population was 159, in 40 families.
