= Cheshmeh-ye Seyyed Yaqub =

Cheshmeh-ye Seyyed Yaqub چشمه سيديعقوب
- Village
- Country: Iran
- Province: Kermanshah
- County: Dalahu
- Bakhsh: Gahvareh
- Rural District: Gurani

Population (2006)
  - Total: 33
- Time zone: UTC+3:30 (IRST)
  - Summer (DST): UTC+4:30 (IRDT)

Cheshmeh-ye Seyyed Yaqub (Persian: چشمه سيديعقوب, also Romanized as Cheshmeh-ye Seyyed Yaʿqūb) is a village in Gurani Rural District, Gahvareh District, Dalahu County, Kermanshah Province, Iran. At the 2006 census, its population was 33, in 6 families.
