= Mir Havaryari =

Mir Havaryari ميرهوارياري
- Village
- Location within Iran
- Coordinates: 34°34′39″N 46°19′25″E
- Country: Iran
- Province: Kermanshah
- County: Dalahu
- Bakhsh: Gahvareh
- Rural District: Qalkhani

Population (2006)
  - Total: 13
- Time zone: UTC+3:30 (IRST)
  - Summer (DST): UTC+4:30 (IRDT)

Mir Havaryari (Persian: ميرهوارياري, also Romanized as Mīr Havāryārī; also known as Mīr Havār) is a village in Qalkhani Rural District, Gahvareh District, Dalahu County, Kermanshah Province, Iran. At the 2006 census, its population was 13, in 4 families.
