= Guraju =

Guraju (Persian: گوراجو) may refer to:

- Guraju Morad Bak
- Guraju Qeshlaq
- Guraju Safar Shah
