= Choqa Bur-e Darabi =

Choqa Bur-e Darabi چقابوردارابي
- Village
- Location within Iran
- Coordinates: 34°20′03″N 46°30′40″E
- Country: Iran
- Province: Kermanshah
- County: Dalahu
- Bakhsh: Gahvareh
- Rural District: Gurani

Population (2006)
  - Total: 135
- Time zone: UTC+3:30 (IRST)
  - Summer (DST): UTC+4:30 (IRDT)

Choqa Bur-e Darabi (Persian: چقابوردارابي, also Romanized as Choqā Būr-e Dārābī; also known as Chaqā Būr-e Dārāb and Choqā Būr-e Dārāb) is a village in Gurani Rural District, Gahvareh District, Dalahu County, Kermanshah Province, Iran. At the 2006 census, its population was 135, in 33 families.
