= Darmaran-e Sofla =

Darmaran-e Sofla درمران سفلي
- Village
- Location within Iran
- Coordinates: 34°35′56″N 46°19′08″E
- Country: Iran
- Province: Kermanshah
- County: Dalahu
- Bakhsh: Gahvareh
- Rural District: Qalkhani

Population (2006)
  - Total: 161
- Time zone: UTC+3:30 (IRST)
  - Summer (DST): UTC+4:30 (IRDT)

Darmaran-e Sofla (Persian: درمران سفلي, also Romanized as Darmarān-e Soflá) is a village in Qalkhani Rural District, Gahvareh District, Dalahu County, Kermanshah Province, Iran. At the 2006 census, its population was 161, in 33 families.
