= Bileh Hu-ye Sofla =

Bileh Hu-ye Sofla بيله هوسفلي
- Village
- Location within Iran
- Coordinates: 34°29′38″N 46°18′07″E
- Country: Iran
- Province: Kermanshah
- County: Dalahu
- Bakhsh: Gahvareh
- Rural District: Qalkhani

Population (2006)
  - Total: 58
- Time zone: UTC+3:30 (IRST)
  - Summer (DST): UTC+4:30 (IRDT)

Bileh Hu-ye Sofla (Persian: بيله هوسفلي, also Romanized as Bīleh Hū-ye Soflá) is a village in Qalkhani Rural District, Gahvareh District, Dalahu County, Kermanshah Province, Iran. At the 2006 census, its population was 58, in 11 families.
