= Safar Shah =

Safar Shah صفرشاه
- Village
- Location within Iran
- Coordinates: 34°18′31″N 46°22′13″E
- Country: Iran
- Province: Kermanshah
- County: Dalahu
- Bakhsh: Gahvareh
- Rural District: Gurani

Population (2006)
  - Total: 278
- Time zone: UTC+3:30 (IRST)
  - Summer (DST): UTC+4:30 (IRDT)

Safar Shah (Persian: صفرشاه, also Romanized as Şafar Shāh and Şefr Shāh; also known as Gūrājū Şafar Shāh and Kūrāb Şafar Shāh) is a village in Gurani Rural District, Gahvareh District, Dalahu County, Kermanshah Province, Iran. At the 2006 census, its population was 278, in 71 families.
