= Ban Zelan =

Ban Zelan (Persian: بان زلان) may refer to:

- Ban Zelan-e Bala
- Ban Zelan-e Sofla
