= Baravand-e Sofla =

Baravand-e Sofla بروندسفلي
- Village
- Location within Iran
- Coordinates: 34°29′41″N 46°13′45″E
- Country: Iran
- Province: Kermanshah
- County: Dalahu
- Bakhsh: Gahvareh
- Rural District: Qalkhani

Population (2006)
  - Total: 362
- Time zone: UTC+3:30 (IRST)
  - Summer (DST): UTC+4:30 (IRDT)

Baravand-e Sofla (Persian: بروندسفلي, also Romanized as Barāvand-e Soflá and Barevand-e Soflá; also known as Barāvand-e Pā’īn) is a village in Qalkhani Rural District, Gahvareh District, Dalahu County, Kermanshah Province, Iran. At the 2006 census, its population was 362, in 81 families.
