= Kamran, Iran =

Kamran (Persian: كامران) may refer to:

- Kamran-e Beyg Reza
- Kamran-e Rahman
