= Kaneh Rashid-e Arab =

Kaneh Rashid-e Arab كنه رشيدعرب
- Village
- Location within Iran
- Coordinates: 34°24′00″N 46°28′00″E
- Country: Iran
- Province: Kermanshah
- County: Dalahu
- Bakhsh: Gahvareh
- Rural District: Gurani

Population (2006)
  - Total: 38
- Time zone: UTC+3:30 (IRST)
  - Summer (DST): UTC+4:30 (IRDT)

Kaneh Rashid-e Arab (Persian: كنه رشيدعرب, also Romanized as Kaneh Rashīd-e ʿArab) is a village in Gurani Rural District, Gahvareh District, Dalahu County, Kermanshah Province, Iran. At the 2006 census, its population was 38, in 9 families.
