= Tukan =

Tukan may refer to:

- Tukan, Beloretsky District, Republic of Bashkortostan, a rural locality in Russia
- Tukan, Iran, a village in Kermanshah Province, Iran

== Other uses ==
- ProFe D-10 Tukan, a two-seat motor glider
- Volkswagen Tukan, a compact pickup truck
