= Takhtgah-e Surat Khanom =

Takhtgah-e Surat Khanom تختگاه صورت خانم
- Village
- Location within Iran
- Coordinates: 34°29′28″N 46°26′48″E
- Country: Iran
- Province: Kermanshah
- County: Dalahu
- Bakhsh: Gahvareh
- Rural District: Gurani

Population (2006)
  - Total: 92
- Time zone: UTC+3:30 (IRST)
  - Summer (DST): UTC+4:30 (IRDT)

Takhtgah-e Surat Khanom (Persian: تختگاه صورت خانم, also Romanized as Takhtgāh-e Şūrat Khānom; also known as Takhtgāh-e Şūrat) is a village in Gurani Rural District, Gahvareh District, Dalahu County, Kermanshah Province, Iran. At the 2006 census, its population was 92, in 25 families.
