= Kachek Bel =

Kachek Bel (Persian: كچكبل), also known as Kajak Bel and Kuchek Bel, may refer to:

- Kachek Bel-e Olya
- Kachek Bel-e Sofla
