= Dasht-e Murt-e Sofla =

Dasht-e Murt-e Sofla دشت مورت سفلي
- Village
- Location within Iran
- Coordinates: 34°37′26″N 46°15′43″E
- Country: Iran
- Province: Kermanshah
- County: Dalahu
- Bakhsh: Gahvareh
- Rural District: Qalkhani

Population (2006)
  - Total: 305
- Time zone: UTC+3:30 (IRST)
  - Summer (DST): UTC+4:30 (IRDT)

Dasht-e Murt-e Sofla (Persian: دشت مورت سفلي, also Romanized as Dasht-e Mūrt-e Soflá) is a village in Qalkhani Rural District, Gahvareh District, Dalahu County, Kermanshah Province, Iran. At the 2006 census, its population was 305, in 57 families.
