= Kamran-e Beyg Reza =

Kamran-e Beyg Reza كامران بيگ رضا
- Village
- Country: Iran
- Province: Kermanshah
- County: Dalahu
- Bakhsh: Gahvareh
- Rural District: Qalkhani

Population (2006)
  - Total: 210
- Time zone: UTC+3:30 (IRST)
  - Summer (DST): UTC+4:30 (IRDT)

Kamran-e Beyg Reza (Persian: كامران بيگ رضا, also Romanized as Kāmrān-e Beyg Rez̤ā) is a village in Qalkhani Rural District, Gahvareh District, Dalahu County, Kermanshah Province, Iran. At the 2006 census, its population was 210, in 50 families.
