= Banyaran-e Amir Haqmorad =

Banyaran-e Amir Haqmorad بان ياران اميرحق مراد
- Village
- Location within Iran
- Coordinates: 34°29′12″N 46°21′26″E
- Country: Iran
- Province: Kermanshah
- County: Dalahu
- Bakhsh: Gahvareh
- Rural District: Gurani

Population (2006)
  - Total: 111
- Time zone: UTC+3:30 (IRST)
  - Summer (DST): UTC+4:30 (IRDT)

Banyaran-e Amir Haqmorad (Persian: بان ياران اميرحق مراد, also Romanized as Bānyārān-e Amīr Ḩaqmorād; also known as Bānyārān-e Seyyed Ḩasan and Bānyārān Morād) is a village in Gurani Rural District, Gahvareh District, Dalahu County, Kermanshah Province, Iran. At the 2006 census, its population was 111, in 32 families.
