= Bi Nahr =

Bi Nahr or Binahr (Persian: بي نهر) may refer to:

- Bi Nahr-e Olya
- Bi Nahr-e Sofla
