= Bansulab-e Nam Khas =

Bansulab-e Nam Khas بان سولاب نام خاص
- Village
- Location within Iran
- Coordinates: 34°32′14″N 46°20′13″E
- Country: Iran
- Province: Kermanshah
- County: Dalahu
- Bakhsh: Gahvareh
- Rural District: Qalkhani

Population (2006)
  - Total: 40
- Time zone: UTC+3:30 (IRST)
  - Summer (DST): UTC+4:30 (IRDT)

Bansulab-e Nam Khas (Persian: بان سولاب نام خاص, also Romanized as Bānsūlāb-e Nām Khāş; also known as Bānsūlāb-e Nāvkhāş) is a village in Qalkhani Rural District, Gahvareh District, Dalahu County, Kermanshah Province, Iran. At the 2006 census, its population was 40, in 10 families.
