= Baba Kuseh-ye Sofla =

Baba Kuseh-ye Sofla باباكوسه سفلي
- Village
- Location within Iran
- Coordinates: 34°34′15″N 46°24′00″E
- Country: Iran
- Province: Kermanshah
- County: Dalahu
- Bakhsh: Gahvareh
- Rural District: Qalkhani

Population (2006)
  - Total: 92
- Time zone: UTC+3:30 (IRST)
  - Summer (DST): UTC+4:30 (IRDT)

Baba Kuseh-ye Sofla (Persian: باباكوسه سفلي, also Romanized as Bābā Kūseh-ye Soflá; also known as Bābā Kūseh) is a village in Qalkhani Rural District, Gahvareh District, Dalahu County, Kermanshah Province, Iran. At the 2006 census, its population was 92, in 19 families.
