= Zavoleh =

Zavoleh or Zavaleh (Persian: زاوله) may refer to:

- Zavoleh-ye Olya
- Zavoleh-ye Sofla
