= Qaleh Qazi-ye Olya =

Qaleh Qazi-ye Olya قلعه قاضي عليا
- Village
- Location within Iran
- Coordinates: 34°21′06″N 46°30′15″E
- Country: Iran
- Province: Kermanshah
- County: Dalahu
- Bakhsh: Gahvareh
- Rural District: Gurani

Population (2006)
  - Total: 33
- Time zone: UTC+3:30 (IRST)
  - Summer (DST): UTC+4:30 (IRDT)

Qaleh Qazi-ye Olya (Persian: قلعه قاضي عليا, also Romanized as Qal‘eh Qāẕī-ye ‘Olyā) is a village in Gurani Rural District, Gahvareh District, Dalahu County, Kermanshah Province, Iran. At the 2006 census, its population was 33, in 7 families.
