= Kandrash =

Kandrash (Persian: شكنرد) may refer to:

- Kandrash-e Babakhan
- Kandrash-e Gol Morad
