= Ban Nokhod =

Ban Nokhvod بان نخود
- Village
- Location within Iran
- Coordinates: 34°27′41″N 46°22′24″E
- Country: Iran
- Province: Kermanshah
- County: Dalahu
- Bakhsh: Gahvareh
- Rural District: Gurani

Population (2006)
  - Total: 80
- Time zone: UTC+3:30 (IRST)
  - Summer (DST): UTC+4:30 (IRDT)

Ban Nokhvod (Persian: بان نخود, also Romanized as Bān Nokhvod; also known as Bān-e Khvod, Bān Khvod, Bā Nokhvod, Karamkhānī, and Pānkhūd) is a village in Gurani Rural District, Gahvareh District, Dalahu County, Kermanshah Province, Iran. At the 2006 census, its population was 80, in 22 families.
