= Darmaran-e Olya =

Darmaran-e Olya درمران عليا
- Village
- Location within Iran
- Coordinates: 34°35′11″N 46°20′10″E
- Country: Iran
- Province: Kermanshah
- County: Dalahu
- Bakhsh: Gahvareh
- Rural District: Qalkhani

Population (2006)
  - Total: 76
- Time zone: UTC+3:30 (IRST)
  - Summer (DST): UTC+4:30 (IRDT)

Darmaran-e Olya (Persian: درمران عليا, also Romanized as Darmarān-e 'Olyā) is a village in Qalkhani Rural District, Gahvareh District, Dalahu County, Kermanshah province, Iran. At the 2006 census, its population was 76, in 14 families.
