= Bi Nahr-e Olya =

Bi Nahr-e Olya بي نهرعليا
- Village
- Location within Iran
- Coordinates: 34°28′38″N 46°16′29″E
- Country: Iran
- Province: Kermanshah
- County: Dalahu
- Bakhsh: Gahvareh
- Rural District: Qalkhani

Population (2006)
  - Total: 268
- Time zone: UTC+3:30 (IRST)
  - Summer (DST): UTC+4:30 (IRDT)

Bi Nahr-e Olya (Persian: بي نهرعليا, also Romanized as Bī Nahr-e ‘Olyā; also known as Bīnahr-e ‘Olyā) is a village in Qalkhani Rural District, Gahvareh District, Dalahu County, Kermanshah Province, Iran. At the 2006 census, its population was 268, in 57 families.
