= Tut Shami =

Village in Kermanshah province, Iran

Tut Shami Persian: توتشامي
- Village
- Location within Iran
- Coordinates: 34°21′48″N 46°20′06″E
- Country: Iran
- Province: Kermanshah
- County: Dalahu
- District: Gahvareh
- Rural District: Gurani

Population (2016)
  - Total: 312
- Time zone: UTC+3:30 (IRST)

Tut Shami (Persian: توتشامي) (Note: Also romanized as Tūt Shāmī and Tutşamî; also known as Naūt Shāmī and Tūt Shāhī; and Kurdish: تۊشامی, romanized as Tüşamî) is a village in Gurani Rural District of Gahvareh District, Dalahu County, Kermanshah province, Iran.

== Demographics ==
=== Ethnicity ===
Tut Shami is important to the Yarsani religion as it is the residence of the Haydarî family, one of the leading spiritual leaders or sayyeds of the Goran Kurds.

=== Population ===
At the time of the 2006 National Census, the village's population was 318 in 79 households. The following census in 2011 counted 296 people in 86 households. The 2016 census measured the population of the village as 312 people in 85 households. It was the most populous village in its rural district.
