= Zavoleh-ye Sofla =

Zavoleh-ye Sofla زاوله سفلي
- Village
- Location within Iran
- Coordinates: 34°30′08″N 46°16′55″E
- Country: Iran
- Province: Kermanshah
- County: Dalahu
- Bakhsh: Gahvareh
- Rural District: Qalkhani

Population (2006)
  - Total: 146
- Time zone: UTC+3:30 (IRST)
  - Summer (DST): UTC+4:30 (IRDT)

Zavoleh-ye Sofla (Persian: زاوله سفلي, also Romanized as Zāvoleh-ye Soflá; also known as Zavaleh, Zāvoleh, and Zāvoleh-ye Pā’īn) is a village in Qalkhani Rural District, Gahvareh District, Dalahu County, Kermanshah Province, Iran. At the 2006 census, its population was 146, in 29 families.
