= Gura Jub-e Baba Karam =

Gura Jub-e Baba Karam گوراجوب باباكرم
- Village
- Location within Iran
- Coordinates: 34°20′14″N 46°21′40″E
- Country: Iran
- Province: Kermanshah
- County: Dalahu
- Bakhsh: Gahvareh
- Rural District: Gurani

Population (2006)
  - Total: 125
- Time zone: UTC+3:30 (IRST)
  - Summer (DST): UTC+4:30 (IRDT)

Gura Jub-e Baba Karam (Persian: گوراجوب باباكرم, also Romanized as Gūrā Jūb-e Bābā Karam) is a village in Gurani Rural District, Gahvareh District, Dalahu County, Kermanshah Province, Iran. At the 2006 census, its population was 125, in 33 families.
