= Bansulab-e Kalbali =

Bansulab-e Kalbali بان سولاب كلب علي
- Village
- Location within Iran
- Coordinates: 34°30′42″N 46°21′03″E
- Country: Iran
- Province: Kermanshah
- County: Dalahu
- Bakhsh: Gahvareh
- Rural District: Qalkhani

Population (2006)
  - Total: 87
- Time zone: UTC+3:30 (IRST)
  - Summer (DST): UTC+4:30 (IRDT)

Bansulab-e Kalbali (Persian: بان سولاب كلب علي, also Romanized as Bānsūlāb-e Kalb‘alī and Bān Sūlāb-e Kalb‘alī; also known as Bān Sūleh-ye Kalb‘alī) is a village in Qalkhani Rural District, Gahvareh District, Dalahu County, Kermanshah Province, Iran. At the 2006 census, its population was 87, in 23 families.
