= Azmeh Miran =

Village in Kermanshah province, Iran

Azmeh Miran Persian: ازمه ميران
- Village
- Location within Iran
- Coordinates: 34°36′46″N 46°12′33″E
- Country: Iran
- Province: Kermanshah
- County: Dalahu
- District: Gahvareh
- Rural District: Qalkhani

Population (2016)
  - Total: 633
- Time zone: UTC+3:30 (IRST)

Azmeh Miran (Persian: ازمه ميران) (Note: Also romanized as Azmeh Mīrān; also known as Azmīrān) is a village in Qalkhani Rural District of Gahvareh District, Dalahu County, Kermanshah province, Iran.

== Demographics ==
=== Population ===
At the time of the 2006 National Census, the village's population was 609 in 119 households. The following census in 2011 counted 633 people in 147 households. The 2016 census measured the population of the village as 633 people in 163 households. It was the most populous village in its rural district.
