= Banyaran-e Teymur =

Banyaran-e Teymur بان ياران تيمور
- Village
- Location within Iran
- Coordinates: 34°28′06″N 46°20′25″E
- Country: Iran
- Province: Kermanshah
- County: Dalahu
- Bakhsh: Gahvareh
- Rural District: Qalkhani

Population (2006)
  - Total: 78
- Time zone: UTC+3:30 (IRST)
  - Summer (DST): UTC+4:30 (IRDT)

Banyaran-e Teymur (Persian: بان ياران تيمور, also Romanized as Bānyārān-e Teymūr; also known as Banīārān-e Seyyed Kākī, Bān Yārān-e Teymūr, Bānyārān Kākī, Deh-e Teymūr, Takya Taimūr, and Takyeh-ye Teymūr) is a village in Qalkhani Rural District, Gahvareh District, Dalahu County, Kermanshah Province, Iran. At the 2006 census, its population was 78, in 21 families. In it there is a shrine to Hazrat Teimur an important figure in Yarsanism.
