= Bileh Hu =

Bileh Hu (Persian: بيله هو) may refer to:

- Bileh Hu-ye Olya
- Bileh Hu-ye Sofla
