= Posht Tappeh =

Posht Tappeh or Poshttappeh (Persian: پشت تپه) may refer to:

- Posht Tappeh, Kermanshah
- Posht Tappeh, Lorestan
