= Takhtgah-e Jahan Bakhsh =

Takhtgah-e Jahan Bakhsh تختگاه جهانبخش
- Village
- Location within Iran
- Coordinates: 34°29′06″N 46°27′11″E
- Country: Iran
- Province: Kermanshah
- County: Dalahu
- Bakhsh: Gahvareh
- Rural District: Gurani

Population (2006)
  - Total: 263
- Time zone: UTC+3:30 (IRST)
  - Summer (DST): UTC+4:30 (IRDT)

Takhtgah-e Jahan Bakhsh (Persian: تختگاه جهانبخش, also romanized as Takhtgāh-e Jahān Bakhsh; also known as Takhtegāh-e Dāneyālī, Takhtgāh-e Dānīāl, Takhtgāh-e Dānīālī, Takht Gāh-e Jahānbakhsh Solţān, and Takhtgān) is a village in Gurani Rural District, Gahvareh District, Dalahu County, Kermanshah Province, Iran. At the 2006 census, its population was 263, in 72 families.
