= Kholeh Kahush =

Kholeh Kahush (Persian: خله كفش), also known as Kholeh Gush, may refer to:

- Kholeh Kahush-e Olya
- Kholeh Kahush-e Sofla
