= Kamran-e Rahman =

Kamran-e Rahman كامران رحمان
- Village
- Country: Iran
- Province: Kermanshah
- County: Dalahu
- Bakhsh: Gahvareh
- Rural District: Qalkhani

Population (2006)
  - Total: 121
- Time zone: UTC+3:30 (IRST)
  - Summer (DST): UTC+4:30 (IRDT)

Kamran-e Rahman (Persian: كامران رحمان, also Romanized as Kāmrān-e Raḥmān) is a village in Qalkhani Rural District, Gahvareh District, Dalahu County, Kermanshah Province, Iran. At the 2006 census, its population was 121, in 24 families.
