= Dasht-e Murt =

Dasht-e Murt (Persian: دشت مورت) may refer to:

- Dasht-e Murt-e Olya, a village in Qalkhani Rural District, Gahvareh District, Dalahu County, Kermanshah Province, Iran.
- Dasht-e Murt-e Sofla, a village in Qalkhani Rural District, Gahvareh District, Dalahu County, Kermanshah Province, Iran
