= Kachek Bel-e Olya =

Kachek Bel-e Olya كچكبل عليا
- Village
- Location within Iran
- Coordinates: 34°23′00″N 46°28′20″E
- Country: Iran
- Province: Kermanshah
- County: Dalahu
- Bakhsh: Gahvareh
- Rural District: Gurani

Population (2006)
  - Total: 194
- Time zone: UTC+3:30 (IRST)
  - Summer (DST): UTC+4:30 (IRDT)

Kachek Bel-e Olya (Persian: كچكبل عليا, also Romanized as Kachek Bel-e ‘Olyā; also known as Kajak Bel-e ‘Olyā and Kūchek Bel-e ‘Olyā) is a village in Gurani Rural District, Gahvareh District, Dalahu County, Kermanshah Province, Iran. At the 2006 census, its population was 194, in 42 families.
