= Cheqa =

Cheqa or Choqa or Chaqa (Persian: چقا) may refer to:

- Chaqa, Isfahan
- Choqa, Kermanshah
- Cheqa, Markazi
- Chogha (disambiguation)

== See also ==
- Chaqa and Cheqa and Choqa are common elements in Iranian place names; see:
