= Barishah-e Beyg Morad =

Barishah-e Beyg Morad بريشاه بيگ مراد
- Village
- Location within Iran
- Coordinates: 34°29′49″N 46°19′09″E
- Country: Iran
- Province: Kermanshah
- County: Dalahu
- Bakhsh: Gahvareh
- Rural District: Qalkhani

Population (2006)
  - Total: 121
- Time zone: UTC+3:30 (IRST)
  - Summer (DST): UTC+4:30 (IRDT)

Barishah-e Beyg Morad (Persian: بريشاه بيگ مراد, also Romanized as Barīshāh-e Beyg Morād; also known as Barīshāh, Barī Shāh, and Barshāh) is a village in Qalkhani Rural District, Gahvareh District, Dalahu County, Kermanshah Province, Iran. At the 2006 census, its population was 121, in 28 families.
