= Kholeh Kahush-e Olya =

Kholeh Kahush-e Olya خله كفش عليا
- Village
- Location within Iran
- Coordinates: 34°26′06″N 46°20′51″E
- Country: Iran
- Province: Kermanshah
- County: Dalahu
- Bakhsh: Gahvareh
- Rural District: Gurani

Population (2006)
  - Total: 43
- Time zone: UTC+3:30 (IRST)
  - Summer (DST): UTC+4:30 (IRDT)

Kholeh Kahush-e Olya (Persian: خله كفش عليا, also Romanized as Kholeh Kāhūsh-e ‘Olyā; also known as Kholeh Gūsh-e ‘Olyā) is a village in Gurani Rural District, Gahvareh District, Dalahu County, Kermanshah Province, Iran. At the 2006 census, its population was 43, in 10 families.
