= Qaleh Zanjir =

Qaleh Zanjir (Persian: قلعه زنجير) may refer to:

- Qaleh Zanjir-e Olya
- Qaleh Zanjir-e Sofla
