= Qaleh Zanjir-e Sofla =

Qaleh Zanjir-e Sofla قلعه زنجيرسفلي
- Village
- Location within Iran
- Coordinates: 34°35′53″N 46°12′51″E
- Country: Iran
- Province: Kermanshah
- County: Dalahu
- Bakhsh: Gahvareh
- Rural District: Qalkhani

Population (2006)
  - Total: 177
- Time zone: UTC+3:30 (IRST)
  - Summer (DST): UTC+4:30 (IRDT)

Qaleh Zanjir-e Sofla (Persian: قلعه زنجيرسفلي, also Romanized as Qal‘eh Zanjīr-e Soflá; also known as Qal‘eh Zanjīr) is a village in Qalkhani Rural District, Gahvareh District, Dalahu County, Kermanshah Province, Iran. At the 2006 census, its population was 177, in 38 families.
