= Takhtgah-e Hoseyn Soltan =

Takhtgah-e Hoseyn Soltan تختگاه حسين سلطان
- Village
- Location within Iran
- Coordinates: 34°27′57″N 46°28′46″E
- Country: Iran
- Province: Kermanshah
- County: Dalahu
- Bakhsh: Gahvareh
- Rural District: Gurani

Population (2006)
  - Total: 253
- Time zone: UTC+3:30 (IRST)
  - Summer (DST): UTC+4:30 (IRDT)

Takhtgah-e Hoseyn Soltan (Persian: تختگاه حسين سلطان, also Romanized as Takhtgāh-e Ḩoseyn Solţān; also known as Takhtgāh-e Ḩoseynī) is a village in Gurani Rural District, Gahvareh District, Dalahu County, Kermanshah Province, Iran. At the 2006 census, its population was 253, in 57 families.
