= Kaneh Rashid-e Allah Feqid =

Kaneh Rashid-e Allah Feqid كنه رشيدالله فقيد
- Village
- Location within Iran
- Coordinates: 34°25′21″N 46°28′06″E
- Country: Iran
- Province: Kermanshah
- County: Dalahu
- Bakhsh: Gahvareh
- Rural District: Gurani

Population (2006)
  - Total: 61
- Time zone: UTC+3:30 (IRST)
  - Summer (DST): UTC+4:30 (IRDT)

Kaneh Rashid-e Allah Feqid (Persian: كنه رشيدالله فقيد, also Romanized as Kaneh Rashīd-e Allah Feqīd; also known as ‘Ālgeh, ‘Ālgeh Faqīh, and Kaneh Rashīd-e Algah) is a village in Gurani Rural District, Gahvareh District, Dalahu County, Kermanshah Province, Iran. At the 2006 census, its population was 61, in 13 families.
