= Ban Zelan-e Bala =

Ban Zelan-e Bala بانزه‌ڵانی بان Banzeĺanî Ban
- Village
- Location within Iran
- Coordinates: 34°30′33″N 46°23′56″E
- Country: Iran
- Province: Kermanshah
- County: Dalahu
- Bakhsh: Gahvareh
- Rural District: Gurani

Population (2006)
  - Total: 192
- Time zone: UTC+3:30 (IRST)
  - Summer (DST): UTC+4:30 (IRDT)

Ban Zelan-e Bala (Kurdish: بانزه‌ڵانی بان, Ban Zelan, romanized: Banzeĺanî Ban, Persian: بان زلان بالا, also Romanized as Bān Zelān-e Bālā; also known as Bān Zelān-e ‘Olyā) is a village in Gurani Rural District, Gahvareh District, Dalahu County, Kermanshah Province, Iran. At the 2006 census, its population was 192, in 42 families.
