= Posht Tappeh, Kermanshah =

Posht Tappeh پشت تپه
- Village
- Location within Iran
- Coordinates: 34°20′44″N 46°30′11″E
- Country: Iran
- Province: Kermanshah
- County: Dalahu
- Bakhsh: Gahvareh
- Rural District: Gurani

Population (2006)
  - Total: 121
- Time zone: UTC+3:30 (IRST)
  - Summer (DST): UTC+4:30 (IRDT)

Posht Tappeh (Persian: پشت تپه, also Romanized as Poshttapeh) is a village in the Gurani Rural District, Gahvareh District, Dalahu County, Kermanshah Province, Iran. At the 2006 census, its population was 121, in 22 families.
