= Shahmar-e Baba Morad =

Shahmar-e Baba Morad شاه ماربابامراد
- Village
- Location within Iran
- Coordinates: 34°30′34″N 46°24′57″E
- Country: Iran
- Province: Kermanshah
- County: Dalahu
- Bakhsh: Gahvareh
- Rural District: Gurani

Population (2006)
  - Total: 121
- Time zone: UTC+3:30 (IRST)
  - Summer (DST): UTC+4:30 (IRDT)

Shahmar-e Baba Morad (Persian: شاه ماربابامراد, also Romanized as Shāhmār-e Bābā Morād; also known as Shāhmār and Sheykh Morad-e Tofangchī) is a village in Gurani Rural District, Gahvareh District, Dalahu County, Kermanshah Province, Iran. At the 2006 census, its population was 121, in 25 families.
