= Baravand-e Olya =

Baravand-e Olya بروندعليا
- Village
- Location within Iran
- Coordinates: 34°30′50″N 46°12′53″E
- Country: Iran
- Province: Kermanshah
- County: Dalahu
- Bakhsh: Gahvareh
- Rural District: Qalkhani

Population (2006)
  - Total: 87
- Time zone: UTC+3:30 (IRST)
  - Summer (DST): UTC+4:30 (IRDT)

Baravand-e Olya (Persian: بروندعليا, also Romanized as Barāvand-e ‘Olyā and Barevand-e ‘Olyā; also known as Barāvand and Barāvand-e Bālā) is a village in Qalkhani Rural District, Gahvareh District, Dalahu County, Kermanshah Province, Iran. At the 2006 census, its population was 87, in 18 families.
