= Dasht-e Murt-e Olya =

Dasht-e Murt-e Olya دشت مورت عليا
- Village
- Location within Iran
- Coordinates: 34°37′07″N 46°15′42″E
- Country: Iran
- Province: Kermanshah
- County: Dalahu
- Bakhsh: Gahvareh
- Rural District: Qalkhani

Population (2006)
  - Total: 94
- Time zone: UTC+3:30 (IRST)
  - Summer (DST): UTC+4:30 (IRDT)

Dasht-e Murt-e Olya (Persian: دشت مورت عليا, also Romanized as Dasht-e Mūrt-e ‘Olyā) is a village in Qalkhani Rural District, Gahvareh District, Dalahu County, Kermanshah Province, Iran. At the 2006 census, its population was 94, in 16 families.
