= Kachek Bel-e Sofla =

Kachek Bel-e Sofla كچكبل سفلي
- Village
- Location within Iran
- Coordinates: 34°23′02″N 46°28′00″E
- Country: Iran
- Province: Kermanshah
- County: Dalahu
- Bakhsh: Gahvareh
- Rural District: Gurani

Population (2006)
  - Total: 116
- Time zone: UTC+3:30 (IRST)
  - Summer (DST): UTC+4:30 (IRDT)

Kachek Bel-e Sofla (Persian: كچكبل سفلي, also Romanized as Kachek Bel-e Soflá; also known as Kajak Bel-e Soflá and Kūchek Bel-e Soflá) is a village in Gurani Rural District, Gahvareh District, Dalahu County, Kermanshah Province, Iran. At the 2006 census, its population was 116, in 22 families.
