= Bansulab-e Hattem =

Bansulab-e Hattem بان سولاب حاتم
- Village
- Country: Iran
- Province: Kermanshah
- County: Dalahu
- Bakhsh: Gahvareh
- Rural District: Qalkhani

Population (2006)
  - Total: 175
- Time zone: UTC+3:30 (IRST)
  - Summer (DST): UTC+4:30 (IRDT)

Bansulab-e Hattem (Persian: بان سولاب حاتم, also Romanized as Bānsūlāb-e Ḩāttem) is a village in Qalkhani Rural District, Gahvareh District, Dalahu County, Kermanshah Province, Iran. At the 2006 census, its population was 175, in 39 families.
