= Tukan, Iran =

Tukan توكان
- Village
- Location within Iran
- Coordinates: 34°22′34″N 46°28′07″E
- Country: Iran
- Province: Kermanshah
- County: Dalahu
- Bakhsh: Gahvareh
- Rural District: Gurani

Population (2006)
  - Total: 91
- Time zone: UTC+3:30 (IRST)
  - Summer (DST): UTC+4:30 (IRDT)

Tukan (Persian: توكان, also Romanized as Tūkān) is a village in Gurani Rural District, Gahvareh District, Dalahu County, Kermanshah Province, Iran. At the 2006 census, its population was 91, in 18 families.
