= Shahmar-e Mirza Morad =

Shahmar-e Mirza Morad شاه مارميرزامراد
- Village
- Location within Iran
- Coordinates: 34°30′40″N 46°24′50″E
- Country: Iran
- Province: Kermanshah
- County: Dalahu
- Bakhsh: Gahvareh
- Rural District: Gurani

Population (2006)
  - Total: 262
- Time zone: UTC+3:30 (IRST)
  - Summer (DST): UTC+4:30 (IRDT)

Shahmar-e Mirza Morad (Persian: شاه مارميرزامراد, also Romanized as Shāhmār-e Mīrzā Morād) is a village in Gurani Rural District, Gahvareh District, Dalahu County, Kermanshah Province, Iran. At the 2006 census, its population was 262, in 52 families.
