= Ban Zelan-e Sofla =

Ban Zelan-e Sofla بانزه‌ڵانی خوار Banzeĺanî Xwar
- Village
- Location within Iran
- Coordinates: 34°30′31″N 46°23′03″E
- Country: Iran
- Province: Kermanshah
- County: Dalahu
- Bakhsh: Gahvareh
- Rural District: Gurani

Population (2006)
  - Total: 48
- Time zone: UTC+3:30 (IRST)
  - Summer (DST): UTC+4:30 (IRDT)

Ban Zelan-e Sofla (Kurdish: بانزه‌ڵانی خوار, Ban Zelan, romanized: Banzeĺanî Xwar, Persian: بان زلان سفلي, also Romanized as Bān Zelān-e Soflá) is a village in Gurani Rural District, Gahvareh District, Dalahu County, Kermanshah Province, Iran. At the 2006 census, its population was 48, in 11 families.
