= Bi Nahr-e Sofla =

Bi Nahr-e Sofla بي نهرسفلي
- Village
- Location within Iran
- Coordinates: 34°29′02″N 46°17′23″E
- Country: Iran
- Province: Kermanshah
- County: Dalahu
- Bakhsh: Gahvareh
- Rural District: Qalkhani

Population (2006)
  - Total: 107
- Time zone: UTC+3:30 (IRST)
  - Summer (DST): UTC+4:30 (IRDT)

Bi Nahr-e Sofla (Persian: بي نهرسفلي, also Romanized as Bī Nahr-e Soflá; also known as Bīnahr-e Soflá) is a village in Qalkhani Rural District, Gahvareh District, Dalahu County, Kermanshah Province, Iran. At the 2006 census, its population was 107, in 25 families.
