= Banyaran-e Aziz Morad =

Banyaran-e Aziz Morad بان ياران عزيزمراد
- Village
- Country: Iran
- Province: Kermanshah
- County: Dalahu
- Bakhsh: Gahvareh
- Rural District: Gurani

Population (2006)
  - Total: 80
- Time zone: UTC+3:30 (IRST)
  - Summer (DST): UTC+4:30 (IRDT)

Banyaran-e Aziz Morad (Persian: بان ياران عزيزمراد, also Romanized as Bānyārān-e ʿAzīz Morād) is a village in Gurani Rural District, Gahvareh District, Dalahu County, Kermanshah Province, Iran. At the 2006 census, its population was 80, in 20 families.
