= Bansulab-e Shirzad =

Bansulab-e Shirzad بان سولاب شيرزاد
- Village
- Location within Iran
- Coordinates: 34°31′04″N 46°22′40″E
- Country: Iran
- Province: Kermanshah
- County: Dalahu
- Bakhsh: Gahvareh
- Rural District: Qalkhani

Population (2006)
  - Total: 27
- Time zone: UTC+3:30 (IRST)
  - Summer (DST): UTC+4:30 (IRDT)

Bansulab-e Shirzad (Persian: بان سولاب شيرزاد, also Romanized as Bānsūlāb-e Shīrzād; also known as Bān Sūleh-ye Shīrzād and Kotak Bozorg) is a village in Qalkhani Rural District, Gahvareh District, Dalahu County, Kermanshah Province, Iran. At the 2006 census, its population was 27, in 8 families.
