= Chougha =

Chogha or Chagha or Chegha (Persian: چغا) is a Persian word for a tell. It may also refer to:

- Chagha, Isfahan
- Chagha, Lorestan
- Cheqa (disambiguation)
- Choghabur (disambiguation)
- Choga (garment), a long-sleeved overcoat

== See also ==
- Chagha and Chegha and Chogha are common elements in Iranian place names; see:
