= Kholeh Kahush-e Sofla =

Kholeh Kahush-e Sofla خله كفش سفلي
- Village
- Location within Iran
- Coordinates: 34°26′23″N 46°21′04″E
- Country: Iran
- Province: Kermanshah
- County: Dalahu
- Bakhsh: Gahvareh
- Rural District: Gurani

Population (2006)
  - Total: 8
- Time zone: UTC+3:30 (IRST)
  - Summer (DST): UTC+4:30 (IRDT)

Kholeh Kahush-e Sofla (Persian: خله كفش سفلي, also Romanized as Kholeh Kāhūsh-e Soflá; also known as Kholeh Gūsh-e Soflá) is a village in Gurani Rural District, Gahvareh District, Dalahu County, Kermanshah Province, Iran. At the 2006 census, its population was 8, in 5 families.
