= Gura Jub-e Zeyyed Ali =

Gura Jub-e Zeyyed Ali گوراجوب زيدعلي
- Village
- Location within Iran
- Coordinates: 34°20′25″N 46°21′22″E
- Country: Iran
- Province: Kermanshah
- County: Dalahu
- Bakhsh: Gahvareh
- Rural District: Gurani

Population (2006)
  - Total: 59
- Time zone: UTC+3:30 (IRST)
  - Summer (DST): UTC+4:30 (IRDT)

Gura Jub-e Zeyyed Ali (Persian: گوراجوب زيدعلي, also Romanized as Gūrā Jūb-e Zeyyed ‘Alī; also known as Gūrā Jūb-e Rīz‘alī, Zeyd ‘Alī, and Zeydarī) is a village in Gurani Rural District, Gahvareh District, Dalahu County, Kermanshah Province, Iran. At the 2006 census, its population was 59, in 14 families.
