= Choghabur-e Kaki =

Choghabur-e Kaki چغابوركاكي
- Village
- Location within Iran
- Coordinates: 34°20′10″N 46°28′46″E
- Country: Iran
- Province: Kermanshah
- County: Dalahu
- Bakhsh: Gahvareh
- Rural District: Gurani

Population (2006)
  - Total: 94
- Time zone: UTC+3:30 (IRST)
  - Summer (DST): UTC+4:30 (IRDT)

Choghabur-e Kaki (Persian: چغابوركاكي, also Romanized as Choghābūr-e Kākī; also known as Choqābūr-e Kākī) is a village in Gurani Rural District, Gahvareh District, Dalahu County, Kermanshah Province, Iran. At the 2006 census, its population was 94, in 22 families.
