= Darmaran =

Darmaran (Persian: درمران) may refer to:

- Darmaran-e Olya
- Darmaran-e Sofla
