= Qaleh Qazi-ye Sofla =

Qaleh Qazi-ye Sofla قلعه قاضي سفلي
- Village
- Location within Iran
- Coordinates: 34°20′38″N 46°29′38″E
- Country: Iran
- Province: Kermanshah
- County: Dalahu
- Bakhsh: Gahvareh
- Rural District: Gurani

Population (2006)
  - Total: 116
- Time zone: UTC+3:30 (IRST)
  - Summer (DST): UTC+4:30 (IRDT)

Qaleh Qazi-ye Sofla (Persian: قلعه قاضي سفلي, also Romanized as Qal‘eh Qāẕī-ye Soflá) is a village in Gurani Rural District, Gahvareh District, Dalahu County, Kermanshah Province, Iran. At the 2006 census, its population was 116, in 22 families.
