= Takhtgah-e Safi Yar Soltan =

Takhtgah-e Safi Yar Soltan تختگاه صفيارسلطان
- Village
- Location within Iran
- Coordinates: 34°29′36″N 46°26′37″E
- Country: Iran
- Province: Kermanshah
- County: Dalahu
- Bakhsh: Gahvareh
- Rural District: Gurani

Population (2006)
  - Total: 88
- Time zone: UTC+3:30 (IRST)
  - Summer (DST): UTC+4:30 (IRDT)

Takhtgah-e Safi Yar Soltan (Persian: تختگاه صفيارسلطان, also Romanized as Takhtgāh-e Şafī Yār Solţān and Takhtgāh-e Şafīyār Solţān) is a village in Gurani Rural District, Gahvareh District, Dalahu County, Kermanshah Province, Iran. At the 2006 census, its population was 88, in 18 families.
