= Banyaran-e Mirza Hoseyn =

Banyaran-e Mirza Hoseyn بان ياران ميرزاحسين
- village
- Location within Iran
- Coordinates: 34°28′48″N 46°19′39″E
- Country: Iran
- Province: Kermanshah
- County: Dalahu
- Bakhsh: Gahvareh
- Rural District: Qalkhani
- Elevation: 1,456 m (4,777 ft)

Population (2006)
  - Total: 56
- Time zone: UTC+3:30 (IRST)
  - Summer (DST): UTC+4:30 (IRDT)

Banyaran-e Mirza Hoseyn (Persian: بان ياران ميرزاحسين, also Romanized as Bānyārān-e Mīrzā Ḩoseyn) is a village in Qalkhani Rural District, Gahvareh District, Dalahu County, Kermanshah Province, Iran. At the 2006 census, its population was 56, in 15 families.
