= Choghabur-e Rahman =

Choghabur-e Rahman چغابوررحمان
- Village
- Location within Iran
- Coordinates: 34°21′00″N 46°27′59″E
- Country: Iran
- Province: Kermanshah
- County: Dalahu
- Bakhsh: Gahvareh
- Rural District: Gurani

Population (2006)
  - Total: 117
- Time zone: UTC+3:30 (IRST)
  - Summer (DST): UTC+4:30 (IRDT)

Choghabur-e Rahman (Persian: چغابوررحمان, also Romanized as Choghābūr-e Raḩmān; also known as Choqābūr-e Raḩmān) is a village in Gurani Rural District, Gahvareh District, Dalahu County, Kermanshah Province, Iran. At the 2006 census, its population was 117, in 24 families.
