= Baba Kuseh =

Baba Kuseh (Persian: باباكوسه) may refer to:

- Baba Kuseh-ye Olya
- Baba Kuseh-ye Sofla
