= Barisha =

Barisha, Bariša or Baricha may refer to:

- Barisha, Harem District, a village in Idlib Governorate, Syria
- Barisha, Kolkata, a residential locale in Calcutta
- Barisha, Jisr ash-Shugur, a village in Idlib Governorate, Syria
- Barisha, Latakia, a village in Latakia Governorate, Syria

== See also ==
- Barisa, a village in Papua New Guinea
- Barishah (disambiguation), villages in Kermanshah Province, Iran
- Barisho, a town in Kenya
