= Kaneh Rashid-e Babakhan =

Kaneh Rashid-e Babakhan كنه رشيدباباخان
- Village
- Location within Iran
- Coordinates: 34°24′19″N 46°28′15″E
- Country: Iran
- Province: Kermanshah
- County: Dalahu
- Bakhsh: Gahvareh
- Rural District: Gurani

Population (2006)
  - Total: 51
- Time zone: UTC+3:30 (IRST)
  - Summer (DST): UTC+4:30 (IRDT)

Kaneh Rashid-e Babakhan (Persian: كنه رشيدباباخان, also Romanized as Kaneh Rashīd-e Bābākhān; also known as Kandrash-e Bābākhān) is a village in Gurani Rural District, Gahvareh District, Dalahu County, Kermanshah Province, Iran. At the 2006 census, its population was 51, in 13 families.
