= Gura Jub-e Morad Beyg =

Gura Jub-e Morad Beyg گه‌وره‌جووێ مێراوه‌ Gewrecû-ŷ Mêrawe
- Village
- Location within Iran
- Coordinates: 34°19′23″N 46°21′35″E
- Country: Iran
- Province: Kermanshah
- County: Dalahu
- Bakhsh: Gahvareh
- Rural District: Gurani

Population (2006)
  - Total: 247
- Time zone: UTC+3:30 (IRST)
  - Summer (DST): UTC+4:30 (IRDT)

Gura Jub-e Morad Beyg (Kurdish: Gewrecû-ŷ Mêrawe ,گه‌وره‌جووێ مێراوه‌, Persian: گوراجوب مرادبيگ, also Romanized as Gūrā Jūb-e Morād Beyg; also known as Gūrājū Morād Bak) is a village in Gurani Rural District, Gahvareh District, Dalahu County, Kermanshah Province, Iran. At the 2006 census, its population was 247, in 70 families.
