= Sar Takhtgah =

Sar Takhtgah سرتختگاه
- Village
- Location within Iran
- Coordinates: 34°27′42″N 46°29′22″E
- Country: Iran
- Province: Kermanshah
- County: Dalahu
- Bakhsh: Gahvareh
- Rural District: Gurani

Population (2006)
  - Total: 195
- Time zone: UTC+3:30 (IRST)
  - Summer (DST): UTC+4:30 (IRDT)

Sar Takhtgah (Persian: سرتختگاه, also Romanized as Sar Takhtgāh and Sartakhtgāh) is a village in Gurani Rural District, Gahvareh District, Dalahu County, Kermanshah Province, Iran. At the 2006 census, its population was 195, in 52 families.
