= Zavoleh-ye Olya =

Village in Kermanshah province, Iran

Zavoleh-ye Olya Persian: زاوله عليا
- Village
- Location within Iran
- Coordinates: 34°30′12″N 46°16′36″E
- Country: Iran
- Province: Kermanshah
- County: Dalahu
- District: Gahvareh
- Rural District: Qalkhani

Population (2016)
  - Total: 159
- Time zone: UTC+3:30 (IRST)

Zavoleh-ye Olya (Persian: زاوله عليا) (Note: Also romanized as Zāvoleh-ye ‘Olyā) is a village in, and the capital of, Qalkhani Rural District of Gahvareh District, Dalahu County, Kermanshah province, Iran.

== Demographics ==
=== Population ===
At the time of the 2006 National Census, the village's population was 218 in 41 households. The following census in 2011 counted 192 people in 48 households. The 2016 census measured the population of the village as 159 people in 44 households.
