= Barishah =

Barishah or Bari Shah (Persian: بريشاه) may refer to:

- Barishah-e Beyg Morad
- Barishah-e Khuybar
