= Choghabur =

Choghabur (Persian: چغابور) may refer to:

- Choghabur-e Kaki
- Choghabur-e Rahman
