= Karamkhani =

Karamkhani (Persian: كرم خاني) may refer to:

- Karamkhani, Gilan
- Karamkhani, Kermanshah
