= Barishah-e Khuybar =

Barishah-e Khuybar بريشاه خوبيار
- Village
- Location within Iran
- Coordinates: 34°31′35″N 46°12′13″E
- Country: Iran
- Province: Kermanshah
- County: Dalahu
- Bakhsh: Gahvareh
- Rural District: Qalkhani

Population (2006)
  - Total: 295
- Time zone: UTC+3:30 (IRST)
  - Summer (DST): UTC+4:30 (IRDT)

Barishah-e Khuybar (Persian: بريشاه خوبيار, also Romanized as Barīshāh-e Khūybār; also known as Barāvand-e Barīshāh) is a village in Qalkhani Rural District, Gahvareh District, Dalahu County, Kermanshah Province, Iran. At the 2006 census, its population was 295, in 59 families.
