= Bavian =

Bavian may refer to:

- Khinnis Reliefs, Assyrian archaeological site in Iraq, also known as Bavian
- Bavian, Iran
- Bavian (short story collection)
