= Gura Jub-e Qeshlaq =

Gura Jub-e Qeshlaq گوراجوب قشلاق
- Village
- Location within Iran
- Coordinates: 34°19′50″N 46°22′14″E
- Country: Iran
- Province: Kermanshah
- County: Dalahu
- Bakhsh: Gahvareh
- Rural District: Gurani

Population (2006)
  - Total: 60
- Time zone: UTC+3:30 (IRST)
  - Summer (DST): UTC+4:30 (IRDT)

Gura Jub-e Qeshlaq (Persian: گوراجوب قشلاق, also Romanized as Gūrā Jūb-e Qeshlāq; also known as Gūrājū Qeshlāq) is a village in Gurani Rural District, Gahvareh District, Dalahu County, Kermanshah Province, Iran. At the 2006 census, its population was 60, in 16 families.
