= Shahyar =

Shahyar (Persian: شهیار) may refer to:

- Shahyar Ghanbari (b. 1950), Iranian songwriter
- Shahyar, Iran, a village in Kermanshah Province, Iran
