= Kaneh Rashid-e Gol Morad =

Kaneh Rashid-e Gol Morad كنه رشيدگل مراد
- Village
- Location within Iran
- Coordinates: 34°24′54″N 46°27′05″E
- Country: Iran
- Province: Kermanshah
- County: Dalahu
- Bakhsh: Gahvareh
- Rural District: Gurani

Population (2006)
  - Total: 72
- Time zone: UTC+3:30 (IRST)
  - Summer (DST): UTC+4:30 (IRDT)

Kaneh Rashid-e Gol Morad (Persian: كنه رشيدگل مراد, also Romanized as Kaneh Rashīd-e Gol Morād; also known as Kandrash-e Gol Morād) is a village in Gurani Rural District, Gahvareh District, Dalahu County, Kermanshah Province, Iran. At the 2006 census, its population was 72, in 13 families.
