= Tell (archaeology) =

Ancient settlement mound

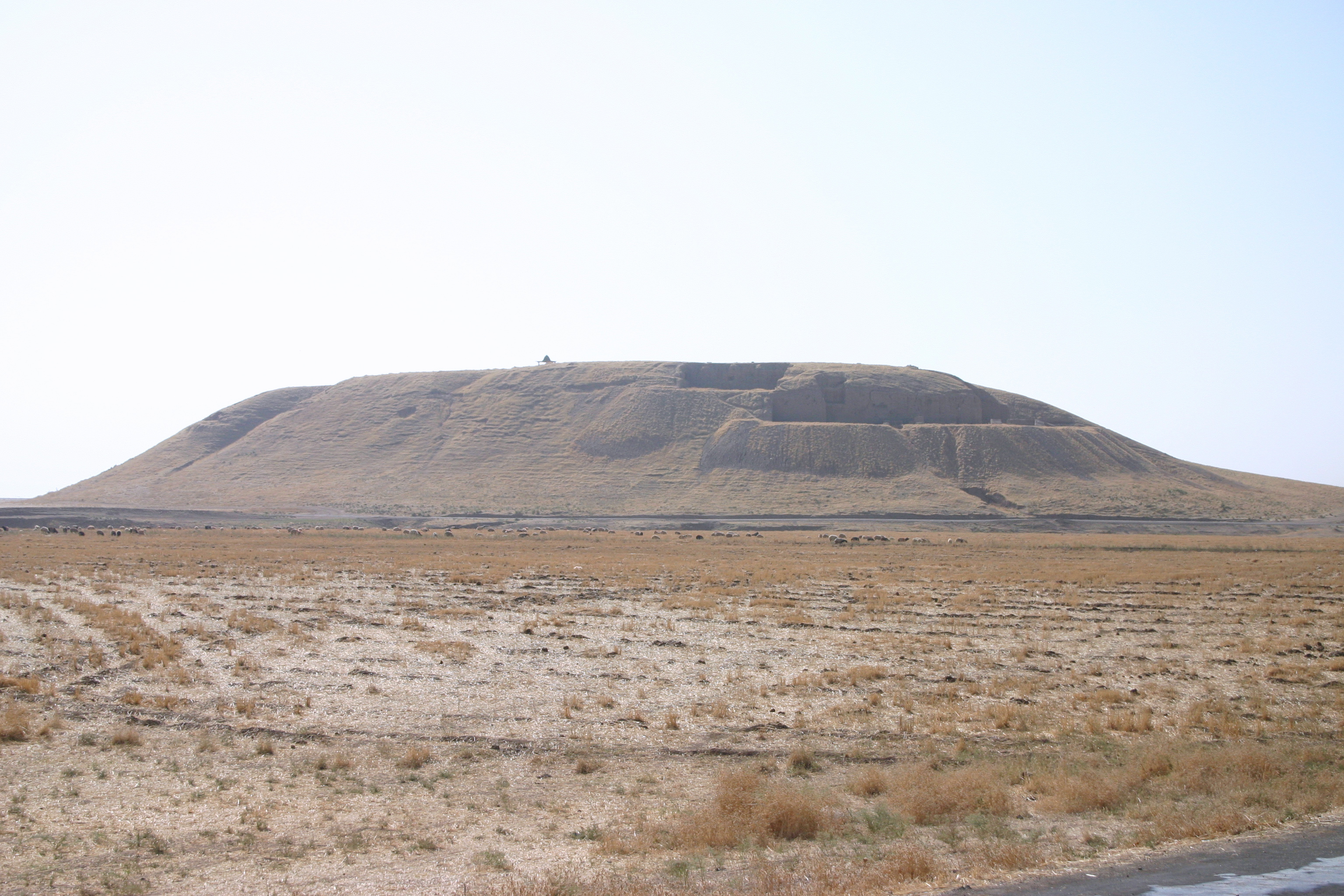
Tell Barri, northeastern Syria, from the west; this is 32 meters (105 feet) high, and its base covers 37 hectares (91 acres)

In archaeology, a tell (Note: Oded Borowski notes that, when transliterating a Hebrew toponym, the English spelling is tel, as opposed to conversion from Arabic, when the word is written "tell". (Borowski 2021)) (from Arabic: تَلّ, tall 'mound, small hill') is an artificial topographical feature, a mound (Note: "Artificial mounds are a characteristic feature of permanent and semipermanent settlement locations in past cultural landscapes, particularly on sedimentary plains, but also in arid and semiarid regions." (Orengo et al. 2020, p. 18240)) consisting of the accumulated and stratified debris of a succession of consecutive settlements at the same site, the refuse of generations of people who built and inhabited them, and natural sediment. (Note: "It is a paradox that a tell cannot by definition begin life as a tell – its earliest incarnation is as a flat site, like other flat sites in its vicinity. Such places did not take on the visual characteristics of tells for some generations but remained in statu nascendi. There is a critical time between the first reoccupation of a placed and the physical manifestation of a mound-a period of generations, if not centuries… The physical transformation of a tell-to-be into a tell depends upon two long-term physical concentrations – of people and house daub.. The nucleation of people in households living close to one another is the first prerequisite of tell-becoming." (Chapman 2000, p. 207))

Tells are most commonly associated with the ancient Near East but are also found elsewhere, such as in Southern Europe and parts of Central Europe, from Greece and Bulgaria to Hungary and Spain, and in North Africa. Within the Near East they are concentrated in less arid regions, including Upper Mesopotamia, the Southern Levant, Anatolia and Iran, which had more continuous settlement. Eurasian tells date to the Neolithic, the Chalcolithic and the Bronze and Iron Ages. In the Southern Levant the time of the tells ended with the conquest by Alexander the Great, which ushered in the Hellenistic period with its own, different settlement-building patterns. Many tells across the Near East continue to be occupied and used today.

== Etymology ==
The word tell is first attested in English in an 1840 report in the Journal of the Royal Geographical Society. It is derived from the Arabic تَلّ (tall) meaning "mound" or "hillock". Variant spellings include tall, tel, til and tal.

The Arabic word has many cognates in other Semitic languages, such as Akkadian tīlu(m) (𒋾𒇻/𒋾𒄿𒈝). The Akkadian form is similar to Sumerian DUL, which can also refer to a pile of any material, such as grain, but it is not known whether the similarity reflects a borrowing from that language or if the Sumerian term itself was a loanword from an earlier Semitic substrate language. If Akkadian tīlu is related to another word in that language, til'u, meaning "woman's breast", there exists a similar term in the South Semitic classical Ethiopian language of Geʽez, namely təla, "breast". Hebrew תֵּל (tél) first appears in the biblical book of Deuteronomy (c. 700–500 BCE), describing a heap or small mound and appearing in the books of Joshua and Jeremiah with the same meaning.

There are lexically unrelated equivalents for this geophysical concept of a town-mound in other Southwest Asian languages, including kom in Egyptian Arabic, tepe or tappeh (Turkish/Persian: تپه), hüyük or höyük (Turkish) and chogha (Persian: چغا, from Turkish çokmak and derivatives çoka etc.).

Equivalent words for town-mound often appear in place names, and the word "tell" itself is one of the most common prefixes for Palestinian toponyms. The Arabic word khirbet, also spelled khirbat (خربة), meaning "ruin", also occurs in the names of many archaeological tells, such as Khirbet et-Tell (roughly meaning "heap of ruins").

== Formation ==
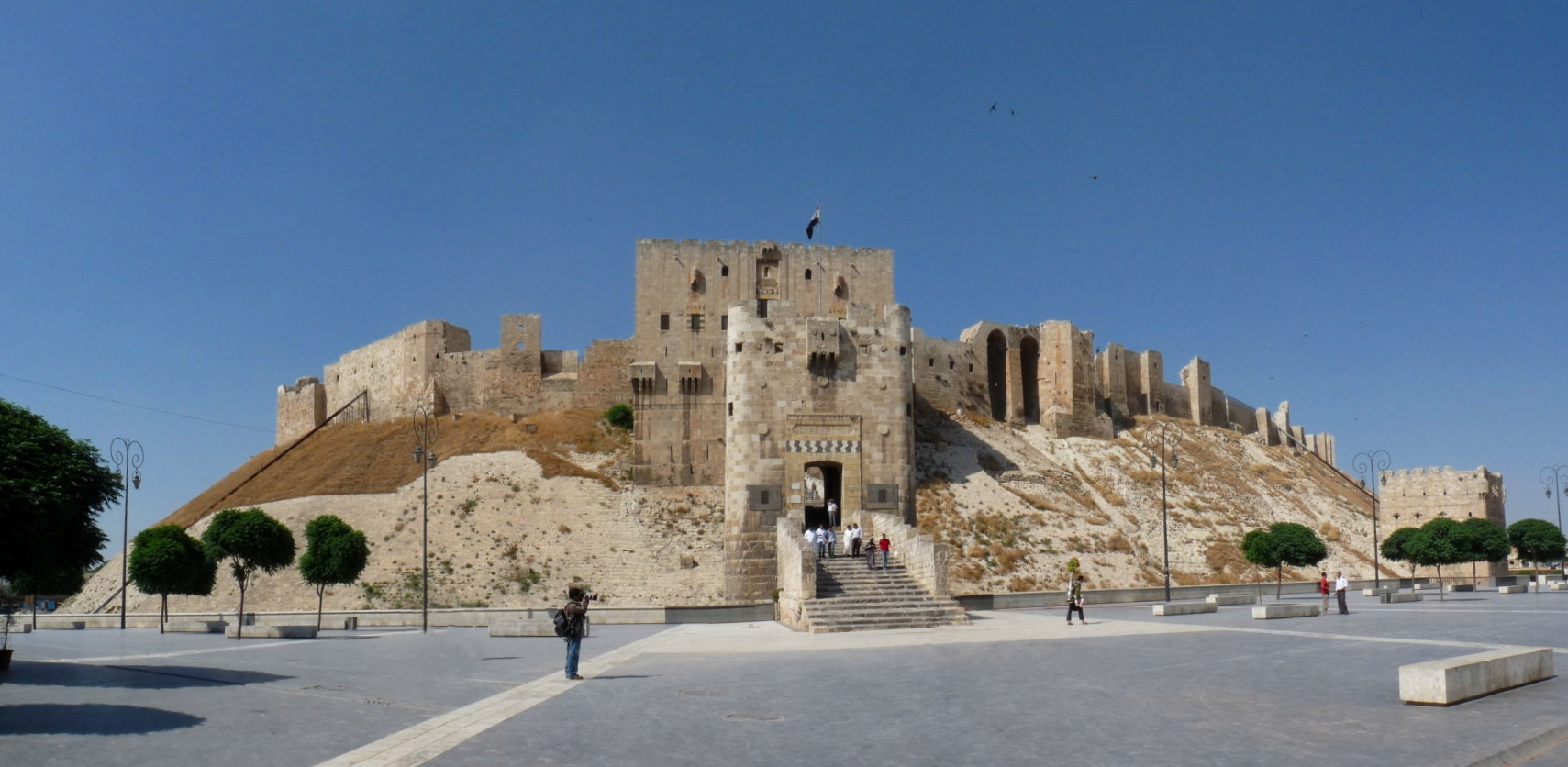
The Citadel of Aleppo, northern Syria, on top of a tell occupied since at least the third millennium BCE

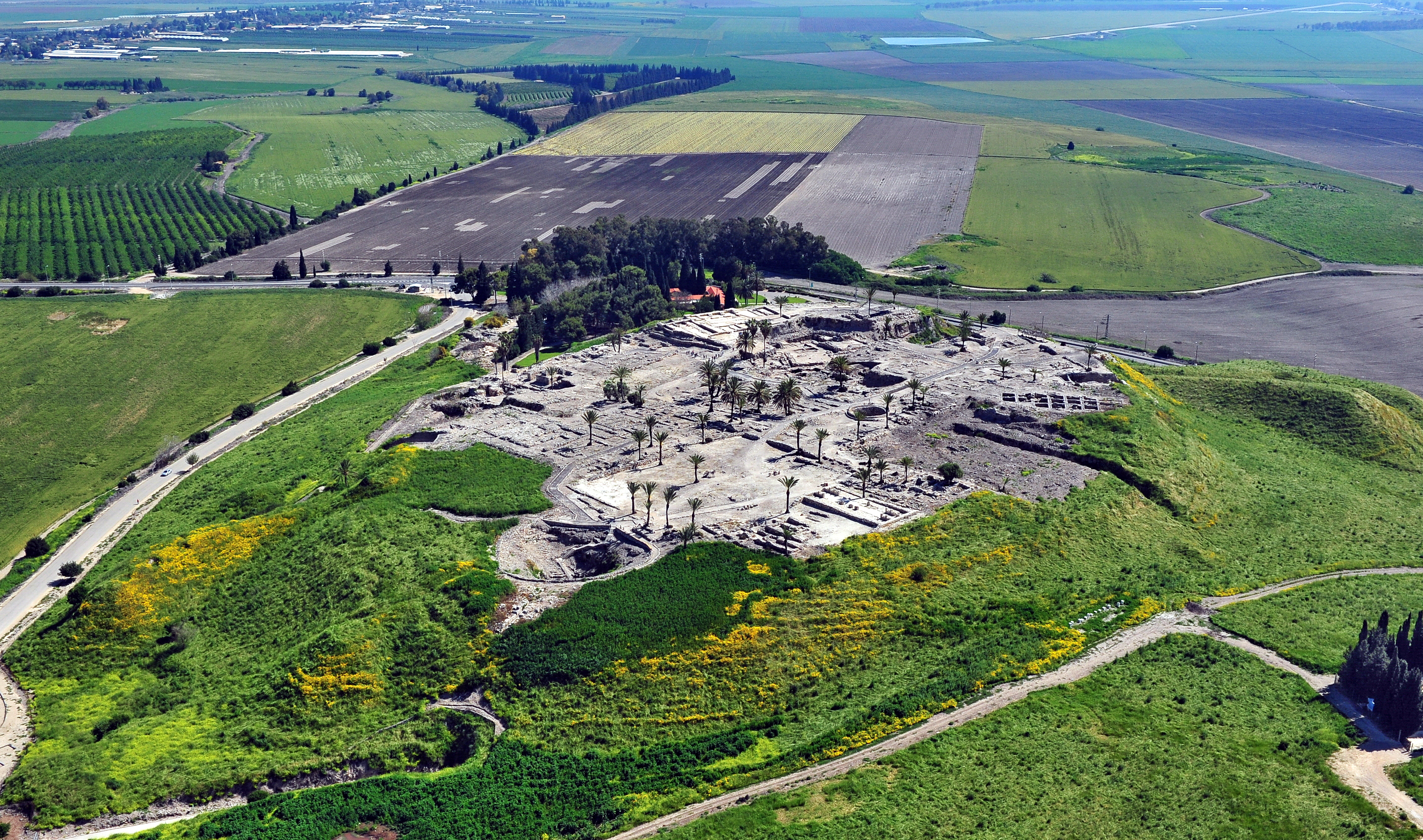
Tel Megiddo, northern Israel

A tell can form only if natural and man-made material accumulates faster than it is removed by erosion and human-caused truncation, which explains the limited geographical area they occur in.

Tells are formed from a variety of remains, including organic and cultural refuse, collapsed mudbricks and other building materials, water-laid sediments, residues of biogenic and geochemical processes and aeolian sediment. A classic tell looks like a low, truncated cone with sloping sides and a flat, mesa-like top. They can be more than 43 m (141 ft) high.

== Occurrence ==
=== Southwest Asia ===
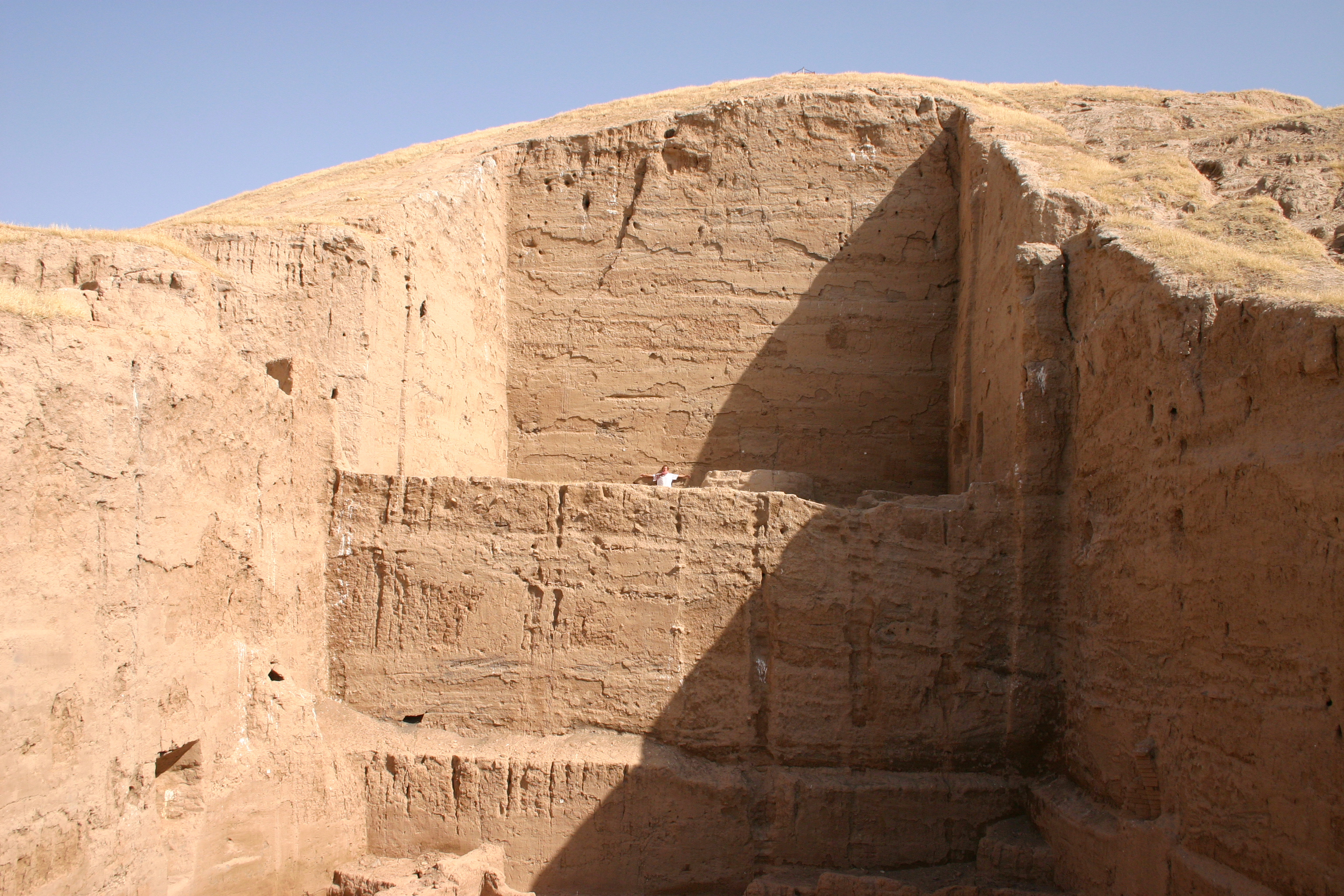
Tell Barri, northeastern Syria

The earliest known examples of tells are in the Jordan Valley, such as at the 10-meter-high mound, dating back to the proto-Neolithic period, at Tell es-Sultan (Jericho) in the West Bank. More than 5,000 tells have been detected in the Southern Levant, covering Jordan, Israel, and Palestine. Of these, Paul Lapp calculated in the 1960s that 98% had yet to be touched by archaeologists.

In Syria, tells are abundant in the Upper Mesopotamia region, scattered along the Euphrates, including Tell al-'Abr, Tell Bazi, Tell Kabir, Tell Mresh, Tell Saghir and Tell Banat. The last is thought to be the site of the oldest war memorial (known as the White Monument), dating from the 3rd millennium BCE.

=== Europe ===
Tells can be found in Europe in countries such as Spain, Hungary, Romania, Bulgaria, North Macedonia, and Greece.

Northeastern Bulgaria has a rich archaeological heritage of eneolithic (4900–3800 BCE) tells from the 5th millennium BCE.

In Neolithic Greece there is a contrast between the northern Thessalian plain, where rainfall was sufficient to permit densely populated settlements based on dry-farming, and the more dispersed sites in southern Greece, such as the Peloponesus, where early villages sprang up around the smaller arable tracts close to springs, lakes, and marshes. Two models account for the tell structures of this part of southern Europe, one developed by Paul Halstead and the other by John Chapman. Chapman envisaged the tell as witness to a nucleated communal society, whereas Halstead emphasized the idea that they arose as individual household structures. Thessalian tells often reflect small hamlets with a population of around 40–80.

The Toumbas of Macedonia and the Magoulas of Thessaly are the local names for tell sites in these regions of Greece.

== See also ==
- List of tells
- Acropolis
- Archaeological site
- Midden
- Dih (archaeology)
