= Gahvareh =

City in Kermanshah province, Iran

Gahvareh Persian: گهواره
- City
- Location within Iran
- Coordinates: 34°20′40″N 46°25′02″E
- Country: Iran
- Province: Kermanshah
- County: Dalahu
- District: Gahvareh

Population (2016)
  - Total: 4,050
- Time zone: UTC+3:30 (IRST)

Gahvareh (Persian: گهواره) (Note: Also romanized as Gahvāreh; also known as Gavāra and Gawareh) is a city in, and the capital of, Gahvareh District of Dalahu County, Kermanshah province, Iran. It also serves as the administrative center for Gurani Rural District.

== Demographics ==
=== Ethnicity ===
The city is populated by Kurds.

=== Population ===
At the time of the 2006 National Census, the city's population was 4,708 in 1,147 households. The following census in 2011 counted 4,619 people in 1,258 households. The 2016 census measured the population of the city as 4,050 people in 1,205 households.
