= Umm Rish =

Umm Rish أم الريش
- Village
- Location in Syria
- Coordinates: 35°53′42″N 36°23′51″E
- Country: Syria
- Governorate: Idlib
- District: Jisr al-Shughur District
- Subdistrict: Jisr al-Shughur Nahiyah

Population (2004)
  - Total: 2,425
- Time zone: UTC+2 (EET)
  - Summer (DST): UTC+3 (EEST)
- City Qrya Pcode: C4194

Umm Rish, also rendered as Barisha, (Arabic: أم الريش) is a Syrian village located in Jisr al-Shughur Nahiyah in Jisr al-Shughur District, Idlib. According to the Syria Central Bureau of Statistics (CBS), Umm Rish had a population of 2425 in the 2004 census.
