= Tukan, Beloretsky District, Republic of Bashkortostan =

Tukan Тукан
- Selo
- Location within Bashkortostan Location within Russia
- Coordinates: 53°50′N 57°27′E
- Country: Russia
- Region: Bashkortostan
- District: Beloretsky District
- Time zone: UTC+5:00

Tukan (Russian: Тукан; Bashkir: Туҡан, Tuqan) is a rural locality (a selo) and the administrative centre of Tukansky Selsoviet, Beloretsky District, Bashkortostan, Russia. The population was 723 as of 2010. There are 33 streets.

== Geography ==
Tukan is located 81 km west of Beloretsk (the district's administrative centre) by road. Maygashlya is the nearest rural locality.
