= Sartakht, Zarand =

Sartakht سرتخت
- Village
- Location within Iran
- Coordinates: 30°37′31″N 56°20′23″E
- Country: Iran
- Province: Kerman
- County: Zarand
- Bakhsh: Central
- Rural District: Jorjafak

Population (2006)
  - Total: 65
- Time zone: UTC+3:30 (IRST)
  - Summer (DST): UTC+4:30 (IRDT)

Sartakht (Persian: سرتخت) is a village in Jorjafak Rural District, in the Central District of Zarand County, Kerman Province, Iran. At the 2006 census, its population was 65, in 17 families.
