= Sar Takht, Shahr-e Babak =

Sar Takht سرتخت
- Village
- Location within Iran
- Coordinates: 30°28′13″N 55°08′13″E
- Country: Iran
- Province: Kerman
- County: Shahr-e Babak
- Bakhsh: Dehaj
- Rural District: Jowzam

Population (2006)
  - Total: 140
- Time zone: UTC+3:30 (IRST)
  - Summer (DST): UTC+4:30 (IRDT)

Sar Takht (Persian: سرتخت, also Romanized as Sar-e Takht) is a village in Jowzam Rural District, Dehaj District, Shahr-e Babak County, Kerman Province, Iran. At the 2006 census, its population was 140, in 42 families.
