= Choqa Said =

Choqa Said چقاسعيد
- Village
- Location within Iran
- Coordinates: 34°15′50″N 47°36′51″E
- Country: Iran
- Province: Kermanshah
- County: Harsin
- Bakhsh: Central
- Rural District: Howmeh

Population (2006)
  - Total: 530
- Time zone: UTC+3:30 (IRST)
  - Summer (DST): UTC+4:30 (IRDT)

Choqa Said (Persian: چقاسعيد, also Romanized as Choqā Sa‘īd; also known as Choghā Sa‘īd and Choqā) is a village in Howmeh Rural District, in the Central District of Harsin County, Kermanshah province, Iran. At the 2006 census, its population was 530, in 127 families.
