= Qanat Qazi =

Qanat Qazi قنات قاضي
- Village
- Location within Iran
- Coordinates: 28°36′59″N 56°34′59″E
- Country: Iran
- Province: Kerman
- County: Arzuiyeh
- Bakhsh: Central
- Rural District: Dehsard

Population (2006)
  - Total: 18
- Time zone: UTC+3:30 (IRST)
  - Summer (DST): UTC+4:30 (IRDT)

Qanat Qazi (Persian: قنات قاضي, also Romanized as Qanāt Qāẕī and Qanāt-e Qāzī' also known as Ghal’eh Ghazi, Kahn-e Ghāzī, Kaleh Kūzi, Qal‘eh-i-Qāzi, and Qal‘eh-ye Qāzī) is a village in Dehsard Rural District, in the Central District of Arzuiyeh County, Kerman Province, Iran. At the 2006 census, its population was 18, in 4 families.
