= Shahmar, East Azerbaijan =

Shahmar شاهمار
- Village
- Location within Iran
- Coordinates: 38°54′57″N 45°36′51″E
- Country: Iran
- Province: East Azerbaijan
- County: Jolfa
- Bakhsh: Central
- Rural District: Shoja

Population (2006)
  - Total: 1,161
- Time zone: UTC+3:30 (IRST)
  - Summer (DST): UTC+4:30 (IRDT)

Shahmar (Persian: شاهمار, also Romanized as Shāhmār) is a village in Shoja Rural District, in the Central District of Jolfa County, East Azerbaijan Province, Iran. At the 2006 census, its population was 1,161, in 303 families.
