= Shahmar, Gilan-e Gharb =

Shahmar شاهمار
- Village
- Location within Iran
- Coordinates: 34°17′31″N 45°53′02″E
- Country: Iran
- Province: Kermanshah
- County: Gilan-e Gharb
- Bakhsh: Central
- Rural District: Direh

Population (2006)
  - Total: 205
- Time zone: UTC+3:30 (IRST)
  - Summer (DST): UTC+4:30 (IRDT)

Shahmar (Persian: شاهمار, also Romanized as Shāhmār; also known as Shāhmār-e Dīreh) is a village in Direh Rural District, in the Central District of Gilan-e Gharb County, Kermanshah Province, Iran. At the 2006 census, its population was 205, in 49 families.
