= Qaleh-ye Qazi, Khuzestan =

Village in Khuzestan, Iran

Qaleh-ye Qazi قلعه قاضي
- Village
- Location within Iran
- Coordinates: 32°16′09″N 48°26′54″E
- Country: Iran
- Province: Khuzestan
- County: Dezful
- Bakhsh: Central
- Rural District: Shamsabad

Population (2006)
  - Total: 181
- Time zone: UTC+3:30 (IRST)
  - Summer (DST): UTC+4:30 (IRDT)

Qaleh-ye Qazi (Persian: قلعه قاضي, also Romanized as Qal‘eh-ye Qāẕī and Qal‘eh Qāzi; also known as Ghal‘eh Ghazī) is a village in Shamsabad Rural District, in the Central District of Dezful County, Khuzestan Province, Iran. At the 2006 census, its population was 181, in 45 families.
