= Shahmar Movsumov =

Azerbaijani politician

Shahmar Movsumov Shahmar Movsumov

Assistant to the President of Azerbaijan
- Incumbent
- Assumed office November 29, 2019
- President: Ilham Aliyev

Executive Director of the State Oil Fund of Azerbaijan
- In office May 15, 2006 – November 29, 2019
- President: Ilham Aliyev
- Preceded by: Samir Sharifov
- Succeeded by: Israfil Mammadov

Executive Director of the Central Bank of Azerbaijan
- In office 2005–2006

Personal details
- Born: 31 January 1972 (age 54) Nakhchivan, Nakhichevan ASSR, Azerbaijan SSR
- Education: Moscow State Institute of International Relations (1990–1995); Harvard Kennedy School (2003–2004)
- Awards

Shahmar Arif oghlu Movsumov (Şahmar Arif oğlu Mövsümov, born January 31, 1972) is the Assistant to the President of the Republic of Azerbaijan, Head of the Department of Economic Issues and Innovative Development Policy of the Presidential Administration of Azerbaijan.

== Biography ==
Shahmar Movsumov was born on January 31, 1972, in Nakhchivan. From 1990 to 1995 he studied at the Faculty of International Economic Relations of Moscow State Institute of International Relations. In 2003–2004 he received master's degree in public administration from Harvard Kennedy School.

== Career ==
From 1995 to 2005 Shahmar Movsumov worked at the Central Bank of Azerbaijan as chief economist, group leader, chief of department, deputy director of the department, director of the department, chief adviser to the chairman of the board.

In 2005–2006 he worked as executive director of the Central Bank of Azerbaijan. From May 15, 2006, to November 29, 2019, he was the executive director of the State Oil Fund of Azerbaijan. He was the Chairman of the Government Commission of the Extractive Industries Transparency Initiative in 2006–2017 and from 2006 to 2016, he was a member of the International Board of the Extractive Industries Transparency Initiative. Since 2013, the Bank has been an independent member of the supervisory board of VTB OJSC.

In 2014–2019, Shahmar Movsumov was a member of the supervisory board of Southern Gas Corridor CJSC. In 2016–2019, he was a member of the Financial Stability Board of the Republic of Azerbaijan. In 2017–2019, he was the chairman of the Extractive Industries Transparency Commission. Since March 14, 2018, he is the chairman of the supervisory board of the International Bank of Azerbaijan. He was a member of the board of the International Forum of Sovereign Wealth Funds in 2018–2019.

Since November 29, 2019, Shahmar Movsumov is the assistant to the President of the Republic of Azerbaijan, head of the Department of Economic Issues and Innovative Development Policy of the Presidential Administration of Azerbaijan. He has been a member of the Economic Council of the Republic of Azerbaijan since September 9, 2020.

== Awards ==
- "Taraggi" Medal — December 29, 2009
