= Shah Mar, Sahneh =

Shah Mar شاهمار
- Village
- Location within Iran
- Coordinates: 34°37′09″N 47°26′36″E
- Country: Iran
- Province: Kermanshah
- County: Sahneh
- Bakhsh: Dinavar
- Rural District: Dinavar

Population (2006)
  - Total: 186
- Time zone: UTC+3:30 (IRST)
  - Summer (DST): UTC+4:30 (IRDT)

Shah Mar (Persian: شاهمار, also Romanized as Shāh Mār; also known as Shahyār) is a village in Dinavar Rural District, Dinavar District, Sahneh County, Kermanshah Province, Iran. At the 2006 census, its population was 186, in 50 families.
