= Cheqa, Isfahan =

Village in Isfahan province, Iran

Cheqa Persian: چقا
- Village
- Location within Iran
- Coordinates: 32°50′56″N 50°18′00″E
- Country: Iran
- Province: Isfahan
- County: Fereydunshahr
- District: Central
- Rural District: Barf Anbar

Population (2016)
  - Total: 971
- Time zone: UTC+3:30 (IRST)

Cheqa (Persian: چقا) (Note: Also romanized as Chaqa, Chaqā, and Cheqā; also known as Chaghā and Cheqā’) is a village in Barf Anbar Rural District of the Central District in Fereydunshahr County, Isfahan province, Iran.

== Demographics ==
=== Population ===
At the time of the 2006 National Census, the village's population was 1,200 in 257 households. The following census in 2011 counted 1,090 people in 307 households. The 2016 census measured the population of the village as 971 people in 287 households.
