= Gurani Rural District =

Rural district in Kermanshah province, Iran

Gurani Rural District Persian: دهستان گوراني
- Rural District
- Location within Iran
- Coordinates: 34°23′18″N 46°24′28″E
- Country: Iran
- Province: Kermanshah
- County: Dalahu
- District: Gahvareh
- Capital: Gahvareh

Population (2016)
  - Total: 4,599
- Time zone: UTC+3:30 (IRST)

Gurani Rural District (Persian: دهستان گوراني) is in Gahvareh District of Dalahu County, Kermanshah province, Iran. It is administered from the city of Gahvareh.

== Demographics ==
=== Population ===
At the time of the 2006 National Census, the rural district's population was 6,514 in 1,499 households. There were 5,093 inhabitants in 1,350 households at the following census of 2011. The 2016 census measured the population of the rural district as 4,599 in 1,328 households. The most populous of its 62 villages was Tut Shami, with 312 people.
