= Qalkhani Rural District =

Rural district in Kermanshah province, Iran

Qalkhani Rural District Persian: دهستان قلخاني
- Rural District
- Location within Iran
- Coordinates: 34°31′41″N 46°13′15″E
- Country: Iran
- Province: Kermanshah
- County: Dalahu
- District: Gahvareh
- Capital: Zavoleh-ye Olya

Population (2016)
  - Total: 6,957
- Time zone: UTC+3:30 (IRST)

Qalkhani Rural District (Persian: دهستان قلخاني) is in Gahvareh District of Dalahu County, Kermanshah province, Iran. Its capital is the village of Zavoleh-ye Olya.

== Demographics ==
=== Population ===
At the time of the 2006 National Census, the rural district's population was 9,354 in 1,954 households. There were 8,050 inhabitants in 1,974 households at the following census of 2011. The 2016 census measured the population of the rural district as 6,957 in 1,864 households. The most populous of its 54 villages was Azmeh Miran, with 633 people.
