= Gahvareh District =

District in Kermanshah province, Iran

Gahvareh District Persian: بخش گهواره
- District
- Location within Iran
- Coordinates: 34°26′52″N 46°16′26″E
- Country: Iran
- Province: Kermanshah
- County: Dalahu
- Capital: Gavareh

Population (2016)
  - Total: 15,606
- Time zone: UTC+3:30 (IRST)

Gahvareh District (Persian: بخش گهواره) is in Dalahu County, Kermanshah province, Iran. Its capital is the city of Gahvareh.

== Demographics ==
=== Population ===
At the time of the 2006 National Census, the district's population was 20,576 in 4,600 households. The following census in 2011 counted 17,762 people in 4,582 households. The 2016 census measured the population of the district as 15,606 inhabitants in 4,397 households.

=== Administrative divisions ===
Gahvareh District Population
| Administrative Divisions | 2006 | 2011 | 2016 |
|---|---|---|---|
| Gurani RD | 6,514 | 5,093 | 4,599 |
| Qalkhani RD | 9,354 | 8,050 | 6,957 |
| Gahvareh (city) | 4,708 | 4,619 | 4,050 |
| Total | 20,576 | 17,762 | 15,606 |
RD = Rural District
