= Dalahu County =

County in Kermanshah province, Iran

Dalahu County Persian: شهرستان دالاهو
- County
- Location of Dalahu County in Kermanshah province (center, yellow)

- Location of Kermanshah province in Iran
- Coordinates: 34°23′N 46°13′E
- Country: Iran
- Province: Kermanshah
- Capital: Kerend-e Gharb
- Districts: Central, Gahvareh

Population (2016)
  - Total: 35,987
- Time zone: UTC+3:30 (IRST)

Dalahu County (Persian: شهرستان دالاهو) (Note: Also romanized as Ŝāhrestāne Dālāhu) is in Kermanshah province, Iran. Its capital is the city of Kerend-e Gharb. Dalahu was separated from Eslamabad-e Gharb County in 2004.

== History ==
After the 2011 National Census, the village of Shahrak-e Rijab, after merging with several other villages, was elevated to city status as Rizhaw.

== Demographics ==
=== Population ===
At the time of the 2006 census, the county's population was 42,310 in 9,665 households. The following census in 2011 counted 39,837 people in 10,364 households. The 2016 census measured the population of the county as 35,987 in 10,266 households.

=== Administrative divisions ===
Dalahu County's population history and administrative structure over three consecutive censuses are shown in the following table.

Dalahu County Population
Administrative Divisions	2006	2011	2016
Central District	21,734	21,741	20,215
Ban Zardeh RD	6,700	7,017	3,212
Bivanij RD	1,458	1,208	1,036
Howmeh-ye Kerend RD	5,682	5,205	4,262
Kerend-e Gharb (city)	7,894	8,311	7,798
Rizhaw (city) (Note: Formerly the village of Shahrak-e Rijab)			3,907
Gahvareh District	20,576	17,762	15,606
Gurani RD	6,514	5,093	4,599
Qalkhani RD	9,354	8,050	6,957
Gahvareh (city)	4,708	4,619	4,050
Total	42,310	39,837	35,987
RD = Rural District

== See also ==
- Sarpol-e Zahab County
- Qasr-e Shirin County

Media related to Dalahu County at Wikimedia Commons
