= Sheykhabad =

Sheykhabad or Shaikhabad or Sheikh Abad or Shaikabad (Persian: شيخ اباد) may refer to:

== Fars Province ==
- Sheykhabad, Fars, a village in Darab County
- Shaikhabad, Sepidan, a village in Sepidan County

== Gilan Province ==
- Sheykhabad, Gilan, a village in Amlash County

== Golestan Province ==
- Sheykhabad-e Yolmeh Salian

== Kerman Province ==
- Sheykhabad, Kerman, a village in Anbarabad County
- Sheykhabad, Kahnuj, a village in Kahnuj County

== Kermanshah Province ==
- Sheykhabad-e Olya, a village in Sahneh County
- Sheykhabad-e Sofla, a village in Sahneh County

== Lorestan Province ==
- Sheykhabad, Delfan
- Sheykhabad, Selseleh
- Sheykhabad Sheykheh
- Sheykhabad-e Zangivand

== Mazandaran Province ==
- Sheykhabad, Mazandaran, a village in Amol County

== Razavi Khorasan Province ==
- Sheykhabad, Razavi Khorasan

== South Khorasan Province ==
- Sheykhabad, South Khorasan, a village in Khusf County

== West Azerbaijan Province ==
- Shaikhabad, West Azerbaijan, a village in Miandoab County

== Yazd Province ==
- Sheykhabad, Yazd, a village in Khatam County
