= Samangan =

Samangan (Persian: سمنگان) may refer to:

== Afghanistan ==
- Samangan Province of Afghanistan
- Aybak, Samangan, the capital of Samangan Province

== Iran ==
- Samangan, Kermanshah
- Samangan-e Olya, Kermanshah Province
- Samangan-e Sofla, Kermanshah Province
- Samangan, Fars
- Samangan, Firuzabad, Fars Province
- Samangan, Quchan, Razavi Khorasan Province
- Samangan, Taybad, Razavi Khorasan Province
- Samangan, Torbat-e Jam, Razavi Khorasan Province
- Samangan railway station, a station in Markazi Province on the Rahahane Gharb line
- Sirjan, previously Samangan, capital of Sirjan County, Kerman Province
