= Mir Azizi =

Mir Azizi (Persian: ميرعزيزي), also rendered as Mirazi, may refer to:

- Mir Azizi, Eslamabad-e Gharb
- Mir Azizi-ye Qadim, Kermanshah County
- Mir Azizi, Ravansar
- Mir Azizi, Sahneh
