= Qeshlaq-e Kelid Darreh =

Qeshlaq-e Kelid Darreh قشلاق كليددره
- Village
- Location within Iran
- Coordinates: 34°28′00″N 47°44′00″E
- Country: Iran
- Province: Kermanshah
- County: Sahneh
- Bakhsh: Central
- Rural District: Sahneh

Population (2006)
  - Total: 67
- Time zone: UTC+3:30 (IRST)
  - Summer (DST): UTC+4:30 (IRDT)

Qeshlaq-e Kelid Darreh (Persian: قشلاق كليددره, also Romanized as Qeshlāq-e Kelīd Darreh) is a village in Sahneh Rural District, in the Central District of Sahneh County, Kermanshah Province, Iran. At the 2006 census, its population was 67, in 16 families.
