= Kal Godar =

Kal Godar كل گدار
- Village
- Location within Iran
- Coordinates: 34°36′29″N 47°43′22″E
- Country: Iran
- Province: Kermanshah
- County: Sahneh
- Bakhsh: Central
- Rural District: Khodabandehlu

Population (2006)
  - Total: 69
- Time zone: UTC+3:30 (IRST)
  - Summer (DST): UTC+4:30 (IRDT)

Kal Godar (Persian: كل گدار, also Romanized as Kal Godār) is a village in Khodabandehlu Rural District, in the Central District of Sahneh County, Kermanshah Province, Iran. At the 2006 census, its population was 69, in 16 families.
