= Eyn ol Qas =

Eyn ol Qas عين القاص
- Village
- Location within Iran
- Coordinates: 34°26′49″N 47°40′18″E
- Country: Iran
- Province: Kermanshah
- County: Sahneh
- Bakhsh: Central
- Rural District: Sahneh

Population (2006)
  - Total: 186
- Time zone: UTC+3:30 (IRST)
  - Summer (DST): UTC+4:30 (IRDT)

Eyn ol Qas (Persian: عين القاص, also Romanized as ‘Eyn ol Qāş) is a village in Sahneh Rural District, in the Central District of Sahneh County, Kermanshah Province, Iran. At the 2006 census, its population was 186, in 50 families.
