= Yekdangi =

Yekdangi يكدانگي
- Village
- Location within Iran
- Coordinates: 34°24′03″N 47°29′56″E
- Country: Iran
- Province: Kermanshah
- County: Sahneh
- Bakhsh: Central
- Rural District: Gamasiyab

Population (2006)
  - Total: 242
- Time zone: UTC+3:30 (IRST)
  - Summer (DST): UTC+4:30 (IRDT)

Yekdangi (Persian: يكدانگي, also Romanized as Yekdangī and Yekdāngī) is a village in Gamasiyab Rural District, in the Central District of Sahneh County, Kermanshah Province, Iran. At the 2006 census, its population was 242, in 53 families.
