= Siah Choqa =

Siah Choqa or Seyah Cheqa or Siah Cheqa (Persian: سياه چقا) may refer to:

- Siah Choqa, Hamadan
- Siah Choqa, Kermanshah
- Siah Choqa, Sahneh, Kermanshah Province
- Siah Choqai (disambiguation)
