= Somaqestan-e Sofla =

Somaqestan-e Sofla سماقستان سفلي
- Village
- Location within Iran
- Coordinates: 34°36′00″N 47°35′00″E
- Country: Iran
- Province: Kermanshah
- County: Sahneh
- Bakhsh: Central
- Rural District: Khodabandehlu

Population (2006)
  - Total: 19
- Time zone: UTC+3:30 (IRST)
  - Summer (DST): UTC+4:30 (IRDT)

Somaqestan-e Sofla (Persian: سماقستان سفلي, also Romanized as Somāqestān-e Soflá) is a village in Khodabandehlu Rural District, in the Central District of Sahneh County, Kermanshah Province, Iran. At the 2006 census, its population was 19, in 5 families.
