= Ilkhaniabad =

Ilkhaniabad ايلخاني اباد
- Village
- Location within Iran
- Coordinates: 34°25′33″N 47°33′18″E
- Country: Iran
- Province: Kermanshah
- County: Sahneh
- Bakhsh: Central
- Rural District: Gamasiyab

Population (2006)
  - Total: 375
- Time zone: UTC+3:30 (IRST)
  - Summer (DST): UTC+4:30 (IRDT)

Ilkhaniabad (Persian: ايلخاني اباد, also Romanized as Īlkhānīābād) is a village in Gamasiyab Rural District, in the Central District of Sahneh County, Kermanshah Province, Iran. At the 2006 census, its population was 375, in 82 families.
