= Darreh Maran =

Darreh Maran دره مران
- Village
- Location within Iran
- Coordinates: 34°27′24″N 47°47′34″E
- Country: Iran
- Province: Kermanshah
- County: Sahneh
- Bakhsh: Central
- Rural District: Sahneh

Population (2006)
  - Total: 39
- Time zone: UTC+3:30 (IRST)
  - Summer (DST): UTC+4:30 (IRDT)

Darreh Maran (Persian: دره مران, also Romanized as Darreh Marān and Darreh-ye Marrān) is a village in Sahneh Rural District, in the Central District of Sahneh County, Kermanshah Province, Iran. At the 2006 census, its population was 39, in 9 families.
