= Qeshlaq-e Seyyed Naser =

Qeshlaq-e Seyyed Naser قشلاق سيدناصر
- Village
- Location within Iran
- Coordinates: 34°32′00″N 47°35′00″E
- Country: Iran
- Province: Kermanshah
- County: Sahneh
- Bakhsh: Central
- Rural District: Hojr

Population (2006)
  - Total: 139
- Time zone: UTC+3:30 (IRST)
  - Summer (DST): UTC+4:30 (IRDT)

Qeshlaq-e Seyyed Naser (Persian: قشلاق سيدناصر, also Romanized as Qeshlāq-e Seyyed Nāşer) is a village in Hojr Rural District, in the Central District of Sahneh County, Kermanshah Province, Iran. At the 2006 census, its population was 139, in 34 families.
