= Qeshlaq-e Hammam Darreh =

Qeshlaq-e Hammam Darreh قشلاق حمامدره
- Village
- Location within Iran
- Coordinates: 34°27′53″N 47°46′03″E
- Country: Iran
- Province: Kermanshah
- County: Sahneh
- Bakhsh: Central
- Rural District: Sahneh

Population (2006)
  - Total: 200
- Time zone: UTC+3:30 (IRST)
  - Summer (DST): UTC+4:30 (IRDT)

Qeshlaq-e Hammam Darreh (Persian: قشلاق حمامدره, also Romanized as Qeshlāq-e Ḩammām Darreh; also known as Ḩammām Darreh) is a village in Sahneh Rural District, in the Central District of Sahneh County, Kermanshah Province, Iran. At the 2006 census, its population was 200, in 43 families.
