= Choqa Janali =

Choqa Janali چقاجانعلي
- Village
- Location within Iran
- Coordinates: 34°24′47″N 47°31′00″E
- Country: Iran
- Province: Kermanshah
- County: Sahneh
- Bakhsh: Central
- Rural District: Gamasiyab

Population (2006)
  - Total: 549
- Time zone: UTC+3:30 (IRST)
  - Summer (DST): UTC+4:30 (IRDT)

Choqa Janali (Persian: چقاجانعلي, also Romanized as Choqā Jān‘alī; also known as Chāq Jān‘alī) is a village in Gamasiyab Rural District, in the Central District of Sahneh County, Kermanshah province, Iran. At the 2006 census, its population was 549, in 109 families.
