= Sar Dehlaq =

Sar Dehlaq سردهلق
- Village
- Location within Iran
- Coordinates: 34°33′34″N 47°41′23″E
- Country: Iran
- Province: Kermanshah
- County: Sahneh
- Bakhsh: Central
- Rural District: Khodabandehlu

Population (2006)
  - Total: 203
- Time zone: UTC+3:30 (IRST)
  - Summer (DST): UTC+4:30 (IRDT)

Sar Dehlaq (Persian: سردهلق, also Romanized as Sardehlāq) is a village in Khodabandehlu Rural District, in the Central District of Sahneh County, Kermanshah Province, Iran. At the 2006 census, its population was 203, in 57 families.
