= Gavdaneh Godar =

Gavdaneh Godar گاودانه گدار
- Village
- Location within Iran
- Coordinates: 34°25′35″N 47°39′01″E
- Country: Iran
- Province: Kermanshah
- County: Sahneh
- Bakhsh: Central
- Rural District: Gamasiyab

Population (2006)
  - Total: 204
- Time zone: UTC+3:30 (IRST)
  - Summer (DST): UTC+4:30 (IRDT)

Gavdaneh Godar (Persian: گاودانه گدار, also Romanized as Gāvdāneh Godār) is a village in Gamasiyab Rural District, in the Central District of Sahneh County, Kermanshah Province, Iran. At the 2006 census, its population was 204, in 57 families.
