= Mal Amiri =

Mal Amiri (Persian: مال اميري) may refer to:

- Mal Amiri-ye Hajj Saadat Karam
- Mal Amiri-ye Olya
- Mal Amiri-ye Sofla
