= Deh-e Moradkhan =

Deh-e Moradkhan دهمرادخان
- Village
- Location within Iran
- Coordinates: 34°27′44″N 47°42′14″E
- Country: Iran
- Province: Kermanshah
- County: Sahneh
- Bakhsh: Central
- Rural District: Sahneh

Population (2006)
  - Total: 627
- Time zone: UTC+3:30 (IRST)
  - Summer (DST): UTC+4:30 (IRDT)

Deh-e Moradkhan (Persian: دهمرادخان, also Romanized as Deh-e Morādkhān) is a village in Sahneh Rural District, in the Central District of Sahneh County, Kermanshah Province, Iran. At the 2006 census, its population was 627, in 160 families.
