= Baderban =

Baderban بدربان
- Village
- Location within Iran
- Coordinates: 34°29′23″N 47°29′51″E
- Country: Iran
- Province: Kermanshah
- County: Sahneh
- Bakhsh: Central
- Rural District: Hojr

Population (2006)
  - Total: 422
- Time zone: UTC+3:30 (IRST)
  - Summer (DST): UTC+4:30 (IRDT)

Baderban (Persian: بدربان, also Romanized as Baderbān) is a village in Hojr Rural District, in the Central District of Sahneh County, Kermanshah province, Iran. At the 2006 census, its population was 422, in 108 families.

== People ==
The village people are Shi'a Muslims and some of the people of this village are descendants of Musa al-Kadhim. Some Baderban people live in Kermanshah city. In baderban, people speak Kurdish. Baderban is the gatekeeper of 108 households.

== Monuments ==
- Tepe Sarab Baderban
- Tepe Musa Baderban
- Tepe Baderban
