= Garrus (disambiguation) =

Garrus Vakarian is a fictional character in BioWare's Mass Effect franchise.

Garrus or Garroos or Garus (Persian: گروس) may also refer to:

== Places in Iran ==
- Historical name of Bijar County
- Garrus, East Azerbaijan
- Garus-e Olya, a village in Kermanshah Province, Iran
- Garus-e Sofla, a village in Kermanshah Province, Iran
- Garus, Kohgiluyeh and Boyer-Ahmad

== Other uses ==
- Garus language
