= Takht-e Shirin =

Takht-e Shirin تخت شيرين
- Village
- Location within Iran
- Coordinates: 34°23′53″N 47°29′25″E
- Country: Iran
- Province: Kermanshah
- County: Sahneh
- Bakhsh: Central
- Rural District: Gamasiyab

Population (2006)
  - Total: 245
- Time zone: UTC+3:30 (IRST)
  - Summer (DST): UTC+4:30 (IRDT)

Takht-e Shirin (Persian: تخت شيرين, also Romanized as Takht-e Shīrīn) is a village in Gamasiyab Rural District, in the Central District of Sahneh County, Kermanshah Province, Iran. At the 2006 census, its population was 245, in 58 families.
