= Pir Sarab =

Pir Sarab پيرسراب
- Village
- Location within Iran
- Coordinates: 34°33′27″N 47°37′17″E
- Country: Iran
- Province: Kermanshah
- County: Sahneh
- Bakhsh: Central
- Rural District: Khodabandehlu

Population (2006)
  - Total: 32
- Time zone: UTC+3:30 (IRST)
  - Summer (DST): UTC+4:30 (IRDT)

Pir Sarab (Persian: پيرسراب, also Romanized as Pīr Sarāb) is a village in Khodabandehlu Rural District, in the Central District of Sahneh County, Kermanshah Province, Iran. At the 2006 census, its population was 32, in 10 families.
