= Cheshmeh-ye Qader =

Cheshmeh-ye Qader چشمه قادر
- Village
- Location within Iran
- Coordinates: 34°23′51″N 47°35′24″E
- Country: Iran
- Province: Kermanshah
- County: Sahneh
- Bakhsh: Central
- Rural District: Gamasiyab

Population (2006)
  - Total: 53
- Time zone: UTC+3:30 (IRST)
  - Summer (DST): UTC+4:30 (IRDT)

Cheshmeh-ye Qader (Persian: چشمه قادر, also Romanized as Cheshmeh-ye Qāder) is a village in Gamasiyab Rural District, in the Central District of Sahneh County, Kermanshah Province, Iran. At the 2006 census, its population was 53, in 12 families.
