= Gorgeh Bisheh-ye Olya =

Gorgeh Bisheh-ye Olya گرگه بيشه عليا
- Village
- Location within Iran
- Coordinates: 34°34′08″N 47°40′48″E
- Country: Iran
- Province: Kermanshah
- County: Sahneh
- Bakhsh: Central
- Rural District: Khodabandehlu

Population (2006)
  - Total: 66
- Time zone: UTC+3:30 (IRST)
  - Summer (DST): UTC+4:30 (IRDT)

Gorgeh Bisheh-ye Olya (Persian: گرگه بيشه عليا, also Romanized as Gorgeh Bīsheh-ye ‘Olyā; also known as Gorg-e Bīsheh-ye Bālā, Gorg-e Bīsheh-ye ‘Olyā, Gurgbishāh, and Gurgbishāh Bāla) is a village in Khodabandehlu Rural District, in the Central District of Sahneh County, Kermanshah Province, Iran. At the 2006 census, its population was 66, in 16 families.
