= Bid Sorkh =

Bid Sorkh بيدسرخ
- Village
- Location within Iran
- Coordinates: 34°26′25″N 47°45′31″E
- Country: Iran
- Province: Kermanshah
- County: Sahneh
- Bakhsh: Central
- Rural District: Sahneh

Population (2006)
  - Total: 757
- Time zone: UTC+3:30 (IRST)
  - Summer (DST): UTC+4:30 (IRDT)

Bid Sorkh (Persian: بيدسرخ, also Romanized as Bīd Sorkh) is a village in Sahneh Rural District, in the Central District of Sahneh County, Kermanshah Province, Iran. At the 2006 census, its population was 757, in 181 families.
