= Yek Jofti =

Yek Jofti يك جفتي
- Village
- Location within Iran
- Coordinates: 34°25′27″N 47°32′26″E
- Country: Iran
- Province: Kermanshah
- County: Sahneh
- Bakhsh: Central
- Rural District: Gamasiyab

Population (2006)
  - Total: 124
- Time zone: UTC+3:30 (IRST)
  - Summer (DST): UTC+4:30 (IRDT)

Yek Jofti (Persian: يك جفتي, also Romanized as Yek Joftī; also known as Yek Khoftī) is a village in Gamasiyab Rural District, in the Central District of Sahneh County, Kermanshah Province, Iran. At the 2006 census, its population was 124, in 26 families.
