= Dehlaqin =

Village in Kermanshah province, Iran

Dehlaqin Persian: دهلقين
- Village
- Location within Iran
- Coordinates: 34°31′55″N 47°41′14″E
- Country: Iran
- Province: Kermanshah
- County: Sahneh
- District: Central
- Rural District: Khodabandehlu

Population (2016)
  - Total: 326
- Time zone: UTC+3:30 (IRST)

Dehlaqin (Persian: دهلقين) (Note: Also romanized as Dehlaqīn; also known as Dehlaq and Dehlaq-e Bālā) is a village in, and the capital of, Khodabandehlu Rural District of the Central District of Sahneh County, Kermanshah province, Iran.

== Demographics ==
=== Population ===
At the time of the 2006 National Census, the village's population was 414 in 113 households. The following census in 2011 counted 412 people in 120 households. The 2016 census measured the population of the village as 326 people in 100 households.
