= Baktar =

Baktar (Persian: بكتر) may refer to:

- Baktar-e Olya
- Baktar-e Sofla
