= Baktar-e Sofla =

Baktar-e Sofla بكترسفلي
- Village
- Location within Iran
- Coordinates: 34°38′29″N 47°35′01″E
- Country: Iran
- Province: Kermanshah
- County: Sahneh
- Bakhsh: Central
- Rural District: Khodabandehlu

Population (2006)
  - Total: 95
- Time zone: UTC+3:30 (IRST)
  - Summer (DST): UTC+4:30 (IRDT)

Baktar-e Sofla (Persian: بكترسفلي, also Romanized as Baktar-e Soflá; also known as Baktar and Baktar-e Pā’īn) is a village in Khodabandehlu Rural District, in the Central District of Sahneh County, Kermanshah Province, Iran. At the 2006 census, its population was 95, in 36 families.
