= 31st Armoured Division =

Armoured Division of the Indian army during World War II

- Active: 1940-1945; 1972-
- Country: (British Raj) British India; India
- Allegiance: British Empire; India
- Branch: British Indian Army; Indian Army
- Type: Armoured
- Size: Division
- Nickname: White Tiger Division
- Equipment: Stuart tank M3 Lee; M4 Sherman; T-90S Bhishma
- Engagements: World War II

Commanders
- Notable commanders: Thomas Corbett; Robert Wordsworth

The 31st Indian Armoured Division was an armoured division of the Indian Army during World War II, formed in 1940, originally as the 1st Indian Armoured Division; it consisted of units of the British Army and the British Indian Army. When it was raised, it consisted of two Armoured Brigades (the 1st and 2nd Indian Armoured Brigades) and one Motor Brigade (the 3rd Indian Motor Brigade).

== History ==
In October 1941, by which time the 1st Indian Support Group had joined the division, the 1st Indian Armoured Division was re-named as the 31st Indian Armoured Division. The brigades were re-named the 251st and 252nd Indian Armoured Brigades and the 31st Indian Support Group (the Motor Brigade's name remained unchanged).

In mid-1942, by which time the support group had been disbanded, the 251st Brigade was detached and the rest of the division was shipped to join the Tenth Army and served in Iraq, Syria and Lebanon. At this time the General Officer Commanding was Major General Robert Wordsworth and the Commander Royal Artillery was Brigadier C. P. B. Wilson. The division never saw combat, although the 3rd Indian Motor Brigade was detached to Egypt and saw much action in the Western Desert Campaign during 1941 and 1942 and again in 1944 and 1945 when, reformed as the 43rd Indian Infantry Brigade (Lorried), it was sent to the Italian Campaign as an independent brigade. The closest the rest of the division came to combat was in April 1944 when it was rushed to Egypt to crush a mutiny among the Greek 1st Infantry Brigade.

The tank regiments received M4 Shermans in November 1943, thought to be in preparation for a transfer to Italy, which never came about and only drove them in Iraq, Syria and Egypt. The 31st Indian Armoured Division was re-named the 1 Armoured Division of the soon-to-be independent Indian Army in October 1945.

With the 31st Division re-named, there was no division numbered '31' in the post-independence Indian Army after 1947 for over twenty years. The 31 Armoured Division was re-established as part of the Indian Army in 1972. It was raised at Jhansi and remains headquartered there as part of XXI Corps. It is also known as the White Tiger Division.

== Structure in 1942 ==
=== 252nd Indian Armoured Brigade ===
- Brigade Commander G.Carr-White
  - 14th/20th Hussars
  - 14th Prince of Wales's Own Scinde Horse
  - 1/4th Bombay Grenadiers

=== 3rd Indian Motor Brigade ===
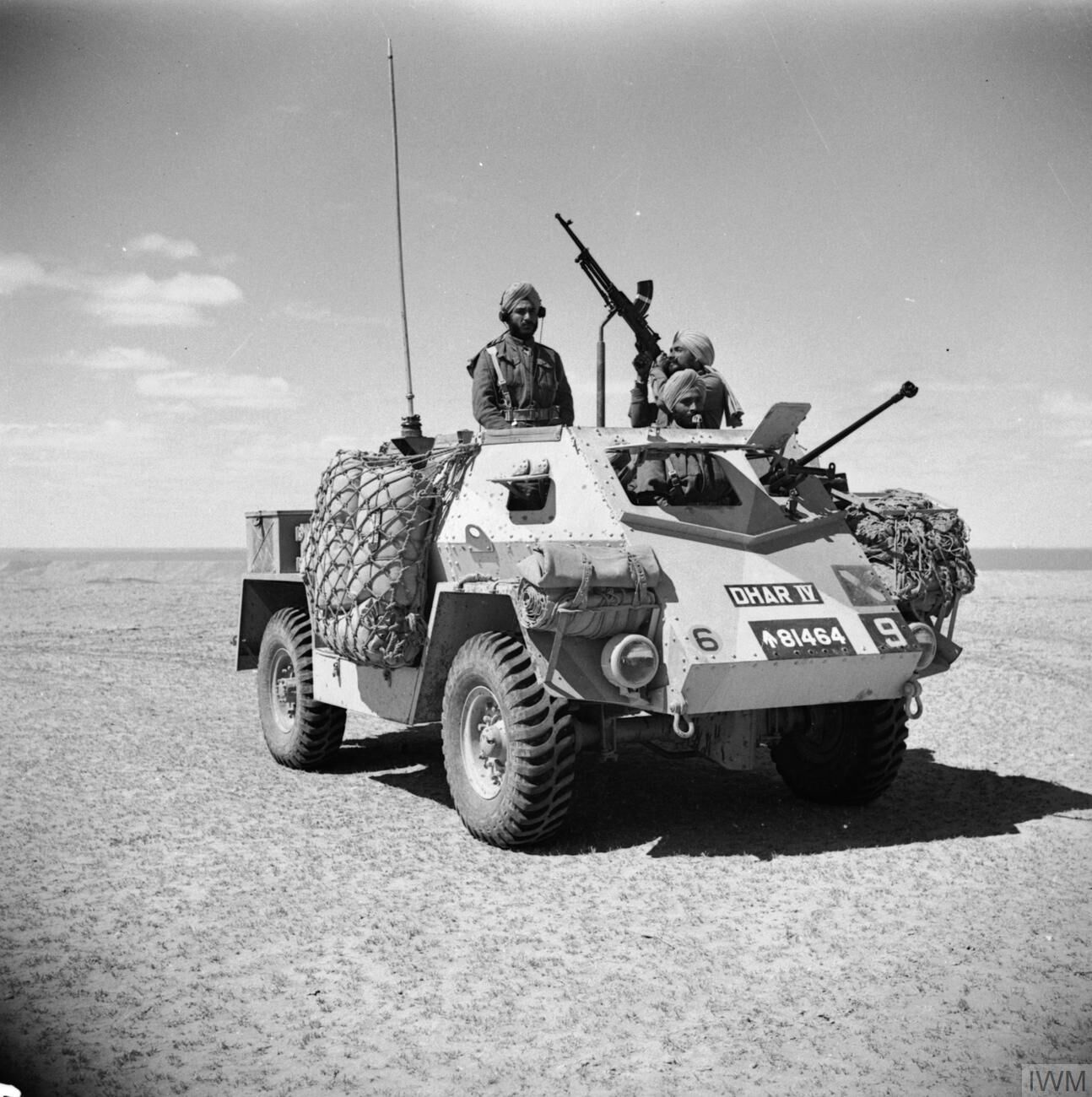
An Indian Pattern Carrier Mk IIA named 'Dhar IV', North Africa of the type used by 3rd Indian Motor Brigade

- Brigade Commander A.A.E. Filose
  - 2nd Lancers (Gardner's Horse)
  - 11th Prince Albert Victor's Own Cavalry (Frontier Force)
  - 18th King Edward's Own Cavalry
  - 31st Field Squadron, KGV's Bengal Sappers & Miners, IE
  - 3rd Motor Brigade Signals Troop
  - 3rd Motor Brigade Troops Transport Company, RIASC
  - 3rd Light Field Ambulance, IMC
  - 3rd Motor Brigade Ordnance Company, IAOC
  - 64th Supply Issue Section, RIASC
  - 28th Field Post Office
- after January 1943
  - 2/6th Gurkha Rifles
  - 2/8th Gurkha Rifles
  - 2/10th Gurkha Rifles

=== Divisional Units ===
  - 13th Duke of Connaught's Own Lancers
  - 15th Field Regiment, Royal Artillery
  - 144th (Surrey & Sussex Yeomanry Queen Mary's) Field Regiment, R.A.
  - 79th Antitank Regiment, R.A.
  - 32nd Field Squadron, QVO Madras Sappers & Miners, Indian Engineers
  - 39th Field Park Squadron, QVO Madras Sappers & Miners, I.E.
  - 31st Indian Armoured Divisional Signals
  - 3rd Supply Issue Section, RIASC
  - 31st Armoured Division Troops Transport Company, RIASC
  - 36th Tank Transport Company, RIASC
  - 2nd Light Field Ambulance, IMS
  - 1st Light Field Hygiene Section, IMS
  - 31st Armoured Division Workshop Company, IAOC
  - 2nd Mobile Workshop Company, IAOC
  - 5th Mobile Workshop Company, IAOC
  - 74th Mobile Workshop Company, IAOC
  - 5th Workshop Squadron, IAOC
  - 31st Armoured Division Recovery Company, IAOC
  - 31st Armoured Division Provost Unit
  - 406th Field Security Service Section
