= Sefid Choqa =

Sefid Choqa (Persian: سفيدچقا) may refer to:

- Sefid Choqa, Kermanshah
- Sefid Choqa, Sahneh, Kermanshah Province
