= Argeneh-ye Olya =

Argeneh-ye Olya ارگنه عليا
- Village
- Location within Iran
- Coordinates: 34°24′39″N 47°38′57″E
- Country: Iran
- Province: Kermanshah
- County: Sahneh
- Bakhsh: Central
- Rural District: Gamasiyab

Population (2006)
  - Total: 303
- Time zone: UTC+3:30 (IRST)
  - Summer (DST): UTC+4:30 (IRDT)

Argeneh-ye Olya (Persian: ارگنه عليا, also Romanized as Argeneh-ye ‘Olyā; also known as Argeneh-ye Bālā) is a village in Gamasiyab Rural District, in the Central District of Sahneh County, Kermanshah Province, Iran. At the 2006 census, its population was 303, in 63 families.
