= Samangan-e Sofla =

Samangan-e Sofla سمنگان سفلي
- Village
- Location within Iran
- Coordinates: 34°26′56″N 47°31′56″E
- Country: Iran
- Province: Kermanshah
- County: Sahneh
- Bakhsh: Central
- Rural District: Hojr

Population (2006)
  - Total: 212
- Time zone: UTC+3:30 (IRST)
  - Summer (DST): UTC+4:30 (IRDT)

Samangan-e Sofla (Persian: سمنگان سفلي, also Romanized as Samangān-e Soflá; also known as Samangān-e Pā’īn) is a village in Hojr Rural District, in the Central District of Sahneh County, Kermanshah Province, Iran. At the 2006 census, its population was 212, in 54 families.
