= Gargelan, Kermanshah =

Gorgelan گرگلان
- village
- Location within Iran
- Coordinates: 34°35′17″N 47°41′51″E
- Country: Iran
- Province: Kermanshah
- County: Sahneh
- Bakhsh: Central
- Rural District: Khodabandehlu

Population (2006)
  - Total: 255
- Time zone: UTC+3:30 (IRST)
  - Summer (DST): UTC+4:30 (IRDT)

Gorgelan (Persian: گرگلان, also Romanized as Gorgelān) is a village in Khodabandehlu Rural District, in the Central District of Sahneh County, Kermanshah Province, Iran. At the 2006 census, its population was 255, in 67 families.
