= Ali Gorzan =

Ali Gorzan (Persian: علي گرزان), also rendered as Ali Kordan or Ali Gordan or Ali Korzan or Ali Khurdan, may refer to:

- Ali Gorzan-e Olya
- Ali Gorzan-e Sofla
