= Garus-e Olya =

Garus-e Olya گروس عليا
- Village
- Location within Iran
- Coordinates: 34°22′38″N 47°46′57″E
- Country: Iran
- Province: Kermanshah
- County: Sahneh
- Bakhsh: Central
- Rural District: Sahneh

Population (2006)
  - Total: 161
- Time zone: UTC+3:30 (IRST)
  - Summer (DST): UTC+4:30 (IRDT)

Garus-e Olya (Persian: گروس عليا, also Romanized as Garūs-e ‘Olyā) is a village in Sahneh Rural District, in the Central District of Sahneh County, Kermanshah Province, Iran. At the 2006 census, its population was 161, in 30 families.
