= Mir Azizi, Sahneh =

Mir Azizi ميرعزيزي
- Village
- Location within Iran
- Coordinates: 34°28′31″N 47°37′34″E
- Country: Iran
- Province: Kermanshah
- County: Sahneh
- Bakhsh: Central
- Rural District: Hojr

Population (2006)
  - Total: 354
- Time zone: UTC+3:30 (IRST)
  - Summer (DST): UTC+4:30 (IRDT)

Mir Azizi (Persian: ميرعزيزي, also Romanized as Mīr ‘Azīzī; also known as Mirazi) is a village in Hojr Rural District, in the Central District of Sahneh County, Kermanshah Province, Iran. At the 2006 census, its population was 354, in 94 families.
