= Elahiyeh, Kermanshah =

Village in Kermanshah province, Iran

Elahiyeh Persian: الهيه
- Village
- Location within Iran
- Coordinates: 34°29′00″N 47°39′28″E
- Country: Iran
- Province: Kermanshah
- County: Sahneh
- District: Central
- Rural District: Hojr

Population (2016)
  - Total: 1,541
- Time zone: UTC+3:30 (IRST)

Elahiyeh (Persian: الهيه) (Note: Also romanized as Elāhīyeh; also known as Elāhīyeh-e Şaḩneh) is a village in Hojr Rural District of the Central District of Sahneh County, Kermanshah province, Iran.

== Demographics ==
=== Population ===
At the time of the 2006 National Census, the village's population was 1,388 in 357 households. The following census in 2011 counted 1,744 people in 507 households. The 2016 census measured the population of the village as 1,541 people in 456 households. It was the most populous village in its rural district.
