= Mal Amiri-ye Sofla =

Village in Kermanshah, Iran

Mal Amiri-ye Sofla مال اميري سفلي
- Village
- Location within Iran
- Coordinates: 34°24′22″N 47°30′41″E
- Country: Iran
- Province: Kermanshah
- County: Sahneh
- Bakhsh: Central
- Rural District: Gamasiyab

Population (2006)
  - Total: 369
- Time zone: UTC+3:30 (IRST)
  - Summer (DST): UTC+4:30 (IRDT)

Mal Amiri-ye Sofla (Persian: مال اميري سفلي, also Romanized as Māl Amīrī-ye Soflá) is a village in Gamasiyab Rural District, in the Central District of Sahneh County, Kermanshah Province, Iran. At the 2006 census, its population was 369, in 74 families.
