= Gavgol =

Gavgol (Persian: گاوگل), also rendered as Gavkol, may refer to:

- Gav Gol
- Gavgol-e Olya
- Gavgol-e Qaleh
