= Garus-e Sofla =

Garus-e Sofla گروس سفلي
- Village
- Location within Iran
- Coordinates: 34°23′01″N 47°45′49″E
- Country: Iran
- Province: Kermanshah
- County: Sahneh
- Bakhsh: Central
- Rural District: Sahneh

Population (2006)
  - Total: 155
- Time zone: UTC+3:30 (IRST)
  - Summer (DST): UTC+4:30 (IRDT)

Garus-e Sofla (Persian: گروس سفلي, also Romanized as Garūs-e Soflá; also known as Garūs and Garūs-e Pā’īn) is a village in Sahneh Rural District, in the Central District of Sahneh County, Kermanshah Province, Iran. At the 2006 census, its population was 155, in 40 families.
