= Sefid Choqa, Sahneh =

Sefid Choqa سفيدچقا
- Village
- Location within Iran
- Coordinates: 34°29′13″N 47°27′33″E
- Country: Iran
- Province: Kermanshah
- County: Sahneh
- Bakhsh: Central
- Rural District: Hojr

Population (2006)
  - Total: 116
- Time zone: UTC+3:30 (IRST)
  - Summer (DST): UTC+4:30 (IRDT)

Sefid Choqa (Persian: سفيدچقا, also Romanized as Sefīd Choqā and Sefīd Cheqā; also known as Sefīd Chia) is a village in Hojr Rural District, in the Central District of Sahneh County, Kermanshah Province, Iran. At the 2006 census, its population was 116, in 31 families.
