= Gavgol-e Qaleh =

Gavgol-e Qaleh گاوگل قلعه
- Village
- Location within Iran
- Coordinates: 34°26′00″N 47°34′23″E
- Country: Iran
- Province: Kermanshah
- County: Sahneh
- Bakhsh: Central
- Rural District: Gamasiyab

Population (2006)
  - Total: 199
- Time zone: UTC+3:30 (IRST)
  - Summer (DST): UTC+4:30 (IRDT)

Gavgol-e Qaleh (Persian: گاوگل قلعه, also Romanized as Gāvgol-e Qal‘eh; also known as Gāvkol, Gāvkol-e Pā’īn, and Gāvkol-e Soflá) is a village in Gamasiyab Rural District, in the Central District of Sahneh County, Kermanshah Province, Iran. At the 2006 census, its population was 199, in 45 families.
