= Argeneh =

Argeneh (Persian: ارگنه), also rendered as Argena and Argana, may refer to:

- Argeneh-ye Olya
- Argeneh-ye Sofla
