= Sheykhiabad =

Sheykhiabad (Persian: شيخي آباد) may refer to:

- Sheykhiabad-e Olya
- Sheykhiabad-e Sofla
