= Gorgalan =

Gorgalan or Gargelan (Persian: گرگلان) may refer to:

- Gargelan, Kermanshah
- Gorgalan, Lorestan
