= Siah Choqa, Sahneh =

Siah Choqa سياه چقا
- Village
- Location within Iran
- Coordinates: 34°25′07″N 47°39′51″E
- Country: Iran
- Province: Kermanshah
- County: Sahneh
- Bakhsh: Central
- Rural District: Sahneh

Population (2006)
  - Total: 659
- Time zone: UTC+3:30 (IRST)
  - Summer (DST): UTC+4:30 (IRDT)

Siah Choqa (Persian: سياه چقا, also Romanized as Sīāh Choqā) is a village in Sahneh Rural District, in the Central District of Sahneh County, Kermanshah Province, Iran. At the 2006 census, its population was 659, in 151 families.
