= Ali Gorzan-e Sofla =

Ali Gorzan-e Sofla علي گرزان سفلي
- Village
- Location within Iran
- Coordinates: 34°27′17″N 47°36′26″E
- Country: Iran
- Province: Kermanshah
- County: Sahneh
- Bakhsh: Central
- Rural District: Gamasiyab

Population (2006)
  - Total: 476
- Time zone: UTC+3:30 (IRST)
  - Summer (DST): UTC+4:30 (IRDT)

Ali Gorzan-e Sofla (Persian: علي گرزان سفلي, also Romanized as ‘Alī Gorzān-e Soflá; also known as ‘Alī Gordān-e Pā’īn, ‘Ali Khurdān, ‘Ali Khurdān Pāīn, ‘Alī Kordān, ‘Alī Korzān-e Pā’īn, ‘Alī Korzān-e Soflá, and Asadābād) is a village in Gamasiyab Rural District, in the Central District of Sahneh County, Kermanshah Province, Iran. At the 2006 census, its population was 476, in 109 families.
