= Argeneh-ye Sofla =

Argeneh-ye Sofla ارگنه سفلي
- Village
- Location within Iran
- Coordinates: 34°23′53″N 47°38′50″E
- Country: Iran
- Province: Kermanshah
- County: Sahneh
- Bakhsh: Central
- Rural District: Gamasiyab

Population (2006)
  - Total: 573
- Time zone: UTC+3:30 (IRST)
  - Summer (DST): UTC+4:30 (IRDT)

Argeneh-ye Sofla (Persian: ارگنه سفلي, also Romanized as Argeneh-ye Soflá; also known as Argana, Argeneh, Argeneh-ye Pā’īn, Qal‘a Argana, Qal‘eh-ye Argenā, and Qal‘eh-ye Argeneh) is a village in Gamasiyab Rural District, in the Central District of Sahneh County, Kermanshah Province, Iran. At the 2006 census, its population was 573, in 137 families.
