= Halan, Iran =

Halan هالان
- Village
- Location within Iran
- Coordinates: 34°37′59″N 47°39′19″E
- Country: Iran
- Province: Kermanshah
- County: Sahneh
- Bakhsh: Central
- Rural District: Khodabandehlu

Population (2006)
  - Total: 263
- Time zone: UTC+3:30 (IRST)
  - Summer (DST): UTC+4:30 (IRDT)

Halan (Persian: هالان, also Romanized as Hālān) is a village in Khodabandehlu Rural District, in the Central District of Sahneh County, Kermanshah Province, Iran. As of the 2006 census, its population was 263, in 66 families.
