= Mal Amiri-ye Olya =

Mal Amiri-ye Olya مال اميري عليا
- Village
- Location within Iran
- Coordinates: 34°24′53″N 47°31′47″E
- Country: Iran
- Province: Kermanshah
- County: Sahneh
- Bakhsh: Central
- Rural District: Gamasiyab

Population (2006)
  - Total: 246
- Time zone: UTC+3:30 (IRST)
  - Summer (DST): UTC+4:30 (IRDT)

Mal Amiri-ye Olya (Persian: مال اميري عليا, also Romanized as Māl Amīrī-ye ‘Olyā) is a village in Gamasiyab Rural District, in the Central District of Sahneh County, Kermanshah Province, Iran. At the 2006 census, its population was 246, in 56 families.
