= Derkeh, Kermanshah =

Village in Kermanshah province, Iran

Derkeh Persian: دركه
- Village
- Location within Iran
- Coordinates: 34°26′51″N 47°40′17″E
- Country: Iran
- Province: Kermanshah
- County: Sahneh
- District: Central
- Rural District: Sahneh

Population (2016)
  - Total: 956
- Time zone: UTC+3:30 (IRST)

Derkeh (Persian: دركه) (Note: Also romanized as Darakeh and Derkah; also known as Darakah-ye ‘Eyn ol Qās, Darka, and Perkeh) is a village in, and the capital of, Sahneh Rural District of the Central District of Sahneh County, Kermanshah province, Iran.

== Demographics ==
=== Population ===
At the time of the 2006 National Census, the village's population was 904 in 215 households. The following census in 2011 counted 1,097 people in 294 households. The 2016 census measured the population of the village as 956 people in 301 households. It was the most populous village in its rural district.
