= Sheykhiabad-e Sofla =

Sheykhiabad-e Sofla شيخي ابادسفلي
- Village
- Location within Iran
- Coordinates: 34°27′45″N 47°30′12″E
- Country: Iran
- Province: Kermanshah
- County: Sahneh
- Bakhsh: Central
- Rural District: Hojr

Population (2006)
  - Total: 351
- Time zone: UTC+3:30 (IRST)
  - Summer (DST): UTC+4:30 (IRDT)

Sheykhiabad-e Sofla (Persian: شيخي ابادسفلي, also Romanized as Sheykhīābād-e Soflá; also known as Shaikabad, Shaikhābād, Sheykhābād-e Soflá, Sheykhīābād, and Sheykhīābād-e Pā’īn) is a village in Hojr Rural District, in the Central District of Sahneh County, Kermanshah Province, Iran. At the 2006 census, its population was 351, in 86 families.
