= Siah Choqai =

Siah Choqai (Persian: سياه چقاي), also rendered as Siah Choqa, may refer to:

- Siah Choqai-ye Olya
- Siah Choqai-ye Sofla
