= Samangan-e Olya =

Village in Kermanshah province, Iran

Samangan-e Olya Persian: سمنگان عليا
- Village
- Location within Iran
- Coordinates: 34°27′06″N 47°33′19″E
- Country: Iran
- Province: Kermanshah
- County: Sahneh
- District: Central
- Rural District: Hojr

Population (2016)
  - Total: 481
- Time zone: UTC+3:30 (IRST)

Samangan-e Olya (Persian: سمنگان عليا) (Note: Also romanized as Samangān-e ‘Olyā; also known as Samangan) is a village in, and the capital of, Hojr Rural District of the Central District of Sahneh County, Kermanshah province, Iran.

== Demographics ==
=== Population ===
At the time of the 2006 National Census, the village's population was 432 in 109 households. The following census in 2011 counted 461 people in 138 households. The 2016 census measured the population of the village as 481 people in 148 households.
