= Gavgol-e Olya =

Village in Kermanshah province, Iran

Gavgol-e Olya Persian: گاوگل عليا
- Village
- Location within Iran
- Coordinates: 34°26′33″N 47°34′54″E
- Country: Iran
- Province: Kermanshah
- County: Sahneh
- District: Central
- Rural District: Gamasiyab

Population (2016)
  - Total: 359
- Time zone: UTC+3:30 (IRST)

Gavgol-e Olya (Persian: گاوگل عليا) (Note: Also romanized as Gāvgol-e ‘Olyā; also known as Gāvkol-e ‘Olyā) is a village in, and the capital of, Gamasiyab Rural District of the Central District of Sahneh County, Kermanshah province, Iran.

== Demographics ==
=== Population ===
At the time of the 2006 National Census, the village's population was 505 in 117 households. The following census in 2011 counted 461 people in 135 households. The 2016 census measured the population of the village as 359 people in 99 households.
