= Ali Gorzan-e Olya =

Village in Kermanshah province, Iran

Ali Gorzan-e Olya Persian: علي گرزان عليا
- Village
- Location within Iran
- Coordinates: 34°27′14″N 47°37′36″E
- Country: Iran
- Province: Kermanshah
- County: Sahneh
- District: Central
- Rural District: Gamasiyab

Population (2016)
  - Total: 559
- Time zone: UTC+3:30 (IRST)

Ali Gorzan-e Olya (Persian: علي گرزان عليا) (Note: Also romanized as ‘Alī Gorzān-e ‘Olyā; also known as ‘Alī Gordān-e Bālā, ‘Ali Khurdān Bālā, ‘Alī Korzān-e Bālā, and ‘Alī Korzān-e ‘Olyā) is a village in Gamasiyab Rural District of the Central District of Sahneh County, Kermanshah province, Iran.

== Demographics ==
=== Population ===
At the time of the 2006 National Census, the village's population was 656 in 138 households. The following census in 2011 counted 713 people in 187 households. The 2016 census measured the population of the village as 559 people in 164 households. It was the most populous village in its rural district.
