= Sheykhiabad-e Olya =

Sheykhiabad-e Olya شيخي آباد عليا
- Village
- Location within Iran
- Coordinates: 34°27′48″N 47°30′46″E
- Country: Iran
- Province: Kermanshah
- County: Sahneh
- Bakhsh: Central
- Rural District: Hojr

Population (2006)
  - Total: 201
- Time zone: UTC+3:30 (IRST)
  - Summer (DST): UTC+4:30 (IRDT)

Sheykhiabad-e Olya (Persian: شيخي آباد عليا, also Romanized as Sheykhīābād-e ‘Olyā; also known as Sheykhābād-e ‘Olyā and Sheykhīābād-e Bālā) is a village in Hojr Rural District, in the Central District of Sahneh County, Kermanshah Province, Iran. At the 2006 census, its population was 201, in 41 families.
