= Halan =

Halan may refer to:

- Halan, Iran, a village in Kermanshah Province, Iran
- Yaroslav Halan (1902–1949), Soviet Ukrainian writer
