= Gamasiyab Rural District =

Gamasiyab Rural District (Persian: دهستان گاماسياب) may refer to:

- Gamasiyab Rural District (Hamadan Province)
- Gamasiyab Rural District (Kermanshah Province)
