= 27th Indian Infantry Brigade =

- Active: 1941–1945
- Country: (British Raj) British India
- Allegiance: British Empire
- Branch: British Indian Army
- Type: Infantry
- Size: Brigade
- Part of: 6th Indian Infantry Division

Commanders
- Notable commanders: Alan Barker

The 27th Indian Infantry Brigade was an infantry brigade formation of the Indian Army during World War II. It was formed in March 1941, at Secundarabad in India and assigned to the 6th Indian Infantry Division. The brigade was used as Line of Communication troops in Iran and Iraq. Between July 1942 and July 1943 it was commanded by Alan Barker.

== Formation ==
- 1st Battalion, 10th Baluch Regiment April 1941 to June 1945
- 4th Battalion, 8th Punjab Regiment April 1941 to January 1943 and August 1943 to June 1944
- 5th Battalion, 12th Frontier Force Regiment April 1941 to May 1942 and December 1942 to January 1943 and February to August 1945
- 159th Field Regiment, Royal Artillery June 1942 to January 1943
- 4th/5th (Cinque Ports) Battalion, Royal Sussex Regiment February 1943 to February 1944
- 87th Field Regiment, Royal Artillery March 1944 to May 1945
- 3rd Battalion, 11th Sikh Regiment May to August 1944
- 27th Field Company, Indian Engineers September 1942

== See also ==
- List of Indian Army Brigades in World War II
