= 43rd Independent Gurkha Infantry Brigade =

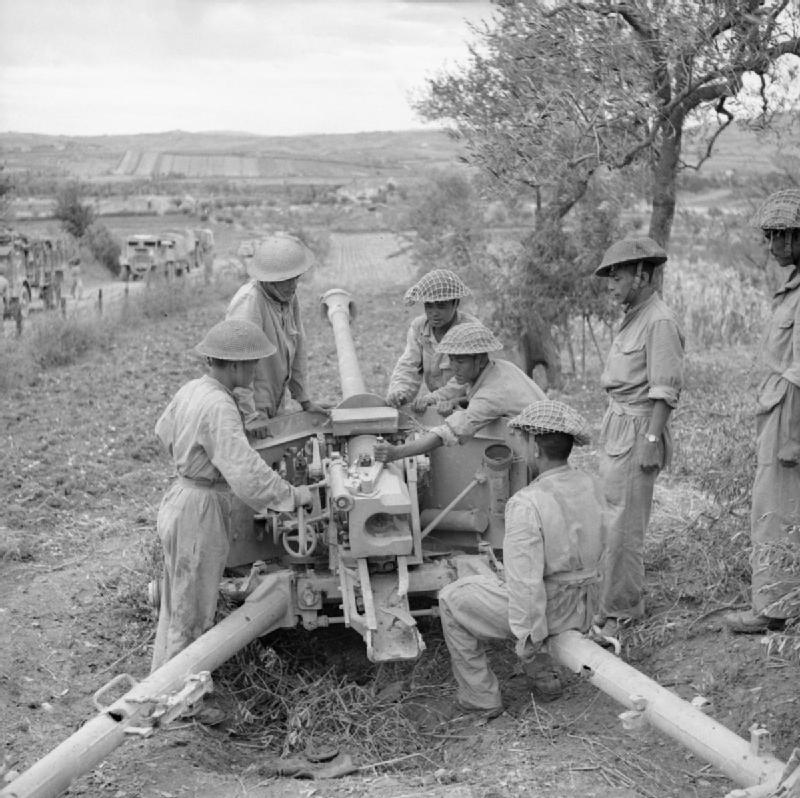
Men of the 2nd Battalion, 6th Gurkha Rifles inspect a captured German 75mm anti-tank gun near San Clemente, Italy, 8 September 1944.

The 43rd Independent Gurkha Infantry Brigade, also called the 43rd Indian Infantry Brigade or the 43rd Gurkha Lorried Infantry Brigade, was an infantry brigade of the Indian Army during World War II. It was created in 1943, by the renaming of the 3rd Indian Motor Brigade (a part of the 1st Indian Armoured Division) and instead of Indian cavalry regiments, it consisted of three Regular Army Gurkha infantry battalions. It was sent to join the 4th, 8th and the 10th Indian Infantry Divisions, and fought in the Italian Campaign.

From 25 September 1944, during the fighting on the Gothic Line, under the command of Brigadier Alan Barker, the brigade was temporarily assigned to the British 56th Infantry Division, replacing the British 168th Infantry Brigade which was being disbanded. The brigade left the division on 7 October 1944.

In the partition of 1947 it was a part of the Punjab Boundary Force.

== Order of battle ==
- 2nd Battalion, 6th Gurkha Rifles
- 2nd Battalion, 8th Gurkha Rifles
- 2nd Battalion, 10th Gurkha Rifles

== See also ==
- List of Indian Army Brigades in World War II

== Sources ==
- Chappell, Mike (1993). The Gurkhas. Osprey Publishing. ISBN 1-85532-357-5.
