= Alan Barker =

Brigadier Alan Barker DSO OBE MC
- Born: 29 October 1898; Canterbury, Kent, England
- Died: August 1984 (aged 85) Trowbridge, Wiltshire, England
- Allegiance: United Kingdom
- Branch: (British Raj) British Indian Army
- Service years: 1916−1948
- Rank: Brigadier
- Commands: 27th Indian Infantry Brigade; 43rd Independent Gurkha Infantry Brigade
- Conflicts: First World War; Third Anglo-Afghan War; Second World War
- Awards: Companion of the Distinguished Service Order; Officer of the Order of the British Empire; Military Cross

Brigadier Alan Robert Barker DSO OBE MC (29 October 1898 – August 1984) was a senior British Indian Army officer of the Second World War.

On 27 October 1916 Barker was commissioned into the Indian Army on the unattached list, and between January and August 1917 he served with the Royal Flying Corps in France. He was promoted to lieutenant on 27 October 1917, and received a commission in the 7th Duke of Edinburgh's Own Gurkha Rifles. Barker then joined the 124th Duchess of Connaught's Own Baluchistan Infantry serving in India.

In 1919 he was awarded the Military Cross for his actions in the Third Anglo-Afghan War. Between 1937 and 1940 he was Brigade Major of the Peshawar Brigade, and he was promoted to lieutenant-colonel in 1942. At some point during the interwar period he attended the Staff College, Camberley.

In July 1942 Barker became the commander of the 27th Indian Infantry Brigade, and led the brigade during operations in the Middle East. In 1944, he became commander of the 43rd Independent Gurkha Infantry Brigade, engaged in the Italian Campaign. On 18 October 1945 he was awarded the Distinguished Service Order for his leadership during heavy fighting on the Gothic Line. On 23 May 1948 he retired from the Indian Army, but was retained on the Army Emergency Reserve of Officers.

He was Honorary Colonel of the 10th (Wiltshire) Battalion, Mobile Defence Corps.
