= 3rd Indian Motor Brigade =

Motor Brigade of the Indian Army during World War II

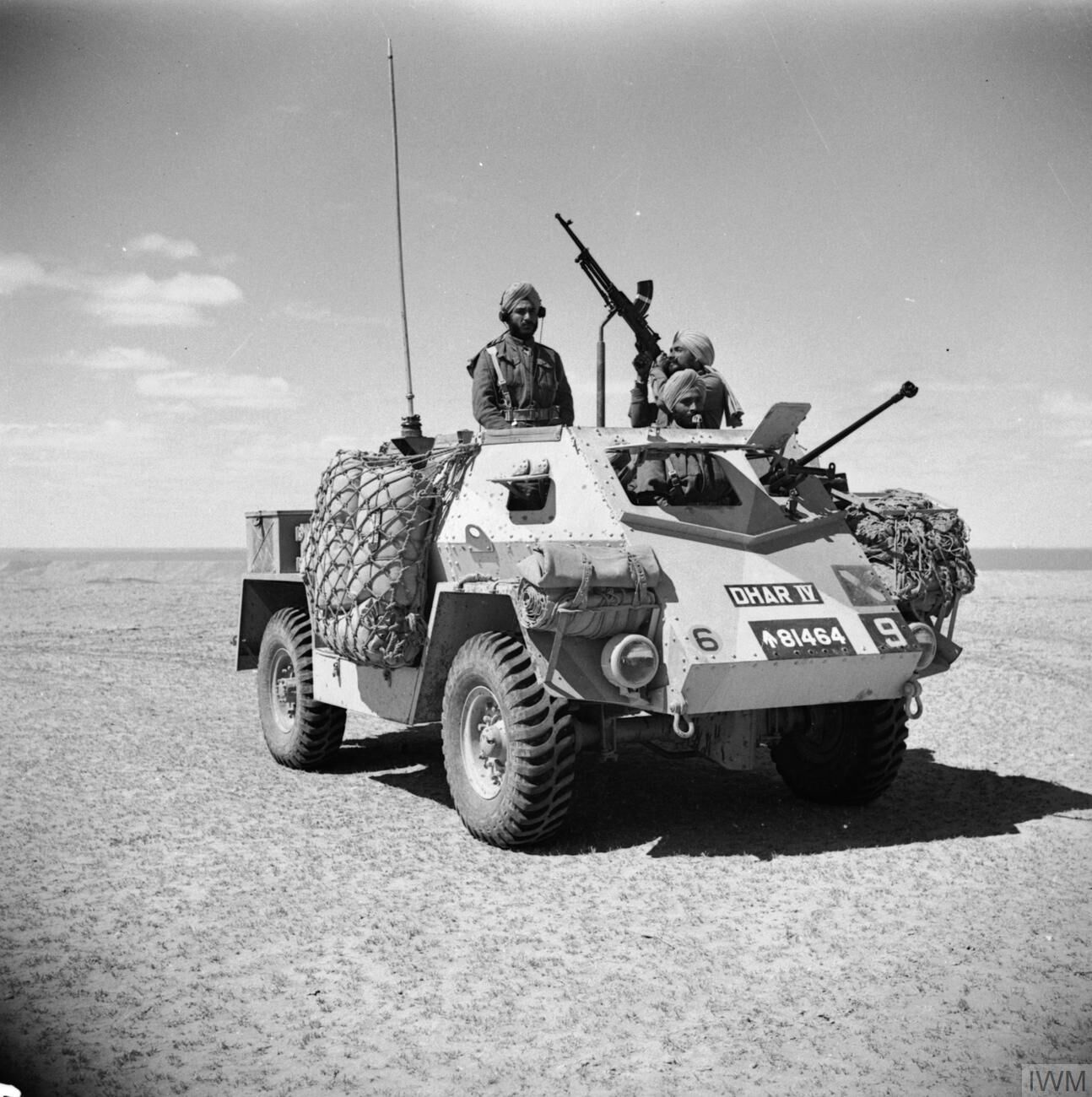
- An Indian Pattern Carrier Mk IIA, Dhar IV in North Africa of the type used by 3rd Indian Motor Brigade.
- Active: 1940–1943
- Country: British India
- Allegiance: British Crown
- Branch: British India Army
- Type: Motorised
- Size: Brigade
- Engagements: World War II: Operation Sonnenblume; Battle of Gazala

Commanders
- Notable commanders: Brigadier Edward Vaughan; Brigadier A. A. E. Filose

The 3rd Indian Motor Brigade was formed in 1940 by the Indian Army during World War II. In 1941, the brigade was surrounded at Mechili by Axis forces during Operation Sonnenblume and suffered many casualties breaking out of the encirclement. One cavalry regiment took part in the Siege of Tobruk and then the brigade was reconstituted in Egypt. In August, the brigade, under Brigadier A. A. E. Filose, was re-equipped at Mena in Egypt and in September moved to north-east Syria.

In May 1942, during the Battle of Gazala the brigade held a defensive box at Point 171 near Bir Hakeim and was again overrun by units of the Afrika Korps and Italian forces. On 28 May, the remnants of the brigade were sent back to Buq Buq to reform and about 800 of the men taken prisoner rejoined soon afterwards. The Axis had released 600 prisoners from captivity after 48 hours, due to a water-shortage, who reached the Free French fighting the Battle of Bir Hakeim (26 May – 11 June) and another 200 men were liberated by a British column.

In July the remaining units of the brigade were dispersed and allotted to the defence of the Nile Delta. In August the brigade was reformed, less the 2nd Field Regiment RA. The brigade then moved to Sahneh in Iran via Baghdad, under the command of the 31st Indian Armoured Division. In late November, it moved to Shaibah near Basra. The cavalry regiments of the brigade returned to India in January 1943 and were replaced by the 2nd Battalion, 6th Gurkha Rifles, 2nd Battalion, 8th Gurkha Rifles and the 2nd Battalion, 10th Gurkha Rifles, the brigade being renamed the 43rd Indian Infantry Brigade (Lorried).

== Formation ==
The 2nd Lancers (Gardner's Horse), together with the 11th Prince Albert Victor's Own Cavalry (Frontier Force) (PAVO) and 18th King Edward's Own Cavalry (KEO) formed Sialkot Area and renamed the 3rd Indian Motor Brigade (Brigadier E. W. D. Vaughan, late OC 2nd Royal Lancers) from July 1940, under the command of the 1st Indian Armoured Division from August 1940. The three cavalry regiments mechanised slowly during 1940 on the Motor Battalion establishment, being mounted in Fordson trucks. The brigade was mobilised for active service on 7 January 1941 and sailed from Bombay on 23 January, arriving at Suez on 6 February. By April, the brigade was tactically mobile but had no artillery, no 2-pounder anti-tank guns, only half its establishment in radios, and was armed mainly with rifles. From there the brigade entrained and travelled to El Qassassin and then moved by lorry to El Tahag camp for training. The brigade moved to Mersa Matruh on 8 March and had two months' desert warfare training, then moved to El Adem from 27 to 28 March.

== Western Desert ==
=== Action of Mechili ===
Cyrenaica Command (Cyrcom, Lieutenant-General Philip Neame) ordered the brigade to move to Martuba, ready to cover Derna and Barce or head south to Mechili, the only source of water for troops advancing on the desert tracks south of the Jebel Akhdar. The brigade (less the KEO guarding the airfield at El Adem), was then ordered south to Mechili, to block an Axis advance from Msus and rendezvous with the 2nd Armoured Division units retreating eastwards, which would provide the field and anti-tank guns needed by the Indian brigade. A stores depot for both units was being set up at Mechili. Mechili was a stone fort in a depression 9 mi (14 km) wide, with a rocky edge up to 800 ft (240 m) high. On the west, the ridge declines into flat open country and the fort lies about 2 mi (3.2 km) from the northern edge. In 1941 there was an airstrip to the south and the fort had been entrenched by the Italians as an all-round defensive position, forming a box 1,200 yd (1,100 m) from east to west and 800 yd (730 m) from north to south (over the winter, drifting sand had silted up the trenches). The 2/3rd Australian Anti-Tank Regiment and a wireless link to Cyrcom were attached and the brigade moved from El Adem via El Timmi to Mechili by the afternoon of 4 April.

And so the brigade group was ready to move and at the allotted time the signal code was hauled up above the Brigade Major's vehicle and the group moved off as one vehicle; the sight of a thousand vehicles of all types, moving in formation, across a fairly level plain was a sight that one could never forget. Down through the years before the war whilst training in the Militia I had worked out exercises and manoeuvres on sand tables and blackboards, but never did I imagine that such a huge force could be controlled as perfectly as was the 3rd Indian Motor Brigade and its attached troops on that morning.

— Major W. B. Nehl

The 2nd Royal Lancers were assigned the west face and the PAVO the east.

==== 5 April ====
The next day, Major-General Michael Gambier-Parry, commander of the 2nd Armoured Division, sent a message to Mechili for M Battery, 3rd RHA (Major R. A. Eden) to meet his headquarters for anti-tank protection while moving to Mechili. The authenticity of the message was questioned and Vaughan asked that the message be repeated, mentioning Eden's nickname for identification but received no reply. That morning, Vaughan and Munro went out to reconnoitre, outside the perimeter, they were fired on by troops on high ground, who were quickly dispersed. The day was spent improving the defences and in the afternoon a Storch flew over and a 25-pounder field gun of the 104th RHA, arrived, to become the only artillery at the fort. In the evening patrols reported dust in the direction of Tengeder and the brigade field squadron returned from there and reported a brush with an Axis party. During the night there were reports of much activity outside the perimeter.

==== 6 April ====
Near dawn, several Very lights were fired from the direction of the airstrip, two aircraft landed and a troop of the 2nd Lancers went to investigate. The aircraft took off and the Lancers noticed an Axis column approaching from the south. (The aircraft carried a party that had been laying mines near Mechili; they landed 15 mi (24 km) away and met Lieutenant-General Erwin Rommel, who ordered all forces to advance, cut the Mechili–Derna road and surround Mechili.) Other patrols returned with prisoners and just after 9:00 a.m., two field guns began to bombard the fort. A third gun opened fire from the north-east but was driven off by a patrol of the PAVO. At 11:00 a.m., infantry mounted in two lorries charged the eastern sector held by the PAVO, along the road towards an Australian anti-tank gun, which stopped the trucks. The troops jumped out, ran for cover and an Australian party went forward and captured a German officer, twenty Italian soldiers and a 47 mm anti-tank gun.

A squadron of the Long Range Desert Group (LRDG) arrived to refuel and Vaughan arranged that the LRDG should operate outside the perimeter. Mitford, the LRDG commander, divided his force and Mitford's section captured the Italian gunner officer in command of the two guns shelling the fort, which ceased fire. Confirmation of the orders to M Battery were received and since there was no sign of Axis troops to the west, the battery set off, escorted by a troop of Lancers and the 25-pounder. The brigade reported the attacks and the response to Cyrcom, which ordered the 2nd Armoured Division to retreat to Mechili; near noon the division moved east towards Mechili. Soon after, the Support Group and the armoured brigade turned north towards Maraua and Derna, after receiving a wireless report ordering a change of direction to Maraura. The divisional headquarters did not receive the message, continued eastwards and O'Connor ordered the 3rd Indian Brigade to send out a petrol convoy to meet the division.

At about 5:00 p.m., Cyrcom heard from Mechili, that the force surrounding them was increasing and that an attack was expected the next day. Mechili was not completely surrounded and parties operated outside the perimeter, PAVO patrols bringing in several prisoners during the day, when the road was closed to the east but still open to the west. A patrol from the squadron at Gadd el Ahmar came in for supplies and found the way blocked when it tried to return; the petrol convoy departed with a troop of the 2nd Lancers, on the route along which the 2nd Armoured Division was expected. M Battery encountered Gambier-Parry the 2nd Armoured Division commander, with the advanced HQ and the last cruiser tank, which reached Mechili about 9:30 p.m. In the evening, a German officer appeared with a flag of truce and demand that the garrison surrender and was seen off by the defenders. The main Axis forces had been unable to reach Mechili in sufficient strength because some units had run out of fuel, others had mechanical difficulties caused by the excessive heat, others had received no rations for four days and many others had got lost or were out of touch.

Group Fabris reached Mechili in the evening, took position to the east and Rommel planned to attack at 7:00 a.m. Cyrcom decided on a general retirement to Gazala and ordered the 3rd Indian Motor Brigade to withdraw to El Adem at once but the message was only addressed to the 2nd Armoured Division and the 3rd Armoured Brigade and apparently was not received by the brigade. Gambier-Parry took command of the garrison force and Vaughan briefed him that the Axis was not strong enough to attack the garrison and that demands for surrender were a bluff to get at the water. Gambier-Parry had brought no other fighting troops and told the conference that the rest of the division should reach Mechili by the following night, less most of the tanks. The garrison saw an Axis force leaguer to the east of Mechili that afternoon and Munro planned a dawn raid with the 10th Battery and an Indian cavalry troop. In the desert, Rommel postponed the attack until the main force arrived.

==== 7 April ====
The raid failed and one of the two guns was lost; at 11:00 a.m., German artillery opened fire from a ridge to the north-east, a party went out in a lorry carrying a Vickers gun to capture the guns but was unable to get close under cover. The bombardment hit vehicles but caused few casualties and a second demand for surrender was made and refused. (Nothing was heard from Cyrcom until the early afternoon when a message was received that the 104th RHA had been sent day before and that the garrison should withdraw if it risked encirclement.) Early in the morning, a British aircraft dropped a message that Mechili was surrounded and that Axis columns were advancing from the south and east. Axis activity was reported to the south and at 11:00 a.m., a small infantry attack was repulsed by the PAVO and several prisoners were taken. In the late afternoon, an Italian attack in lorries was made towards the positions of the 2nd Lancers and the Australian 11th Battery. An anti-tank gun hit a lorry, more prisoners were taken and another 47 mm anti-tank gun was captured. The two anti-tank guns were made a section and Munro, the battery commander, took one to the perimeter to test its sights and fired at a group of Axis troops moving into position. The troops turned out to be gunners and bombarded the camp for half an hour, during which A Squadron KEO came in from Gadd-al-Ahmar 30 mi (48 km) to the south-east, having skirmished with armoured cars en route.

The main Axis attack did not occur as Rommel was still waiting for Group Olbrich from Msus and towards evening he flew off in a Storch to find them. Rommel found the group about 30 mi (48 km) short of Mechili and decided to attack without it. A mixed unit of the Ariete Division, had reached Mechili during the day, having been attacked by Bristol Blenheim bombers of 45 Squadron, 55 Squadron and the last Hurricane fighters of 3 Squadron RAAF. In the evening, Rommel sent another surrender demand, offering "the full honours of war" but the reply was the same. When the emissary returned to his lines, about 14 guns began to bombard the garrison. Machine-gun fire was received for more than an hour with no effect and just before dusk, armoured cars forced a standing patrol of the 2nd Lancers in the south-western sector near the landing ground to withdraw; later the attackers retired and the position was reoccupied. Group Streich, most of the 5th Light Division advanced force, which had been ordered to Tobruk, arrived as night fell and Rommel ordered the attack to begin at dawn next day.

===== Break-out plan =====
At dusk Gambier-Parry sent a message to Cyrcom asking for the whereabouts of the reinforcements and received a reply at 10:00 p.m. that the 104th RHA was not coming and that the location of the 3rd Armoured Brigade was uncertain. Gambier-Parry and Vaughan planned a surprise break-out at first light next morning and a retreat to El Adem. Axis artillery took up positions to the south and east and in the afternoon a bombardment began until nightfall when Axis infantry attacked until 10:30 p.m. and then the bombardment resumed, followed by two more infantry attacks. Vaughan planned to make the escape in a box formation, the KEO and the cruiser tank forming an advanced guard. The divisional and brigade headquarters were to follow, then the engineers and other services, with flank protection by the PAVO, the regimental headquarters and one squadron on the left, the other squadron on the right. Behind them as the main guard were the 2nd Lancers, less two squadrons which were the rearguard. Munro was to provide two troops of anti-tank guns for the advanced guard and brigade headquarters, a troop for the flank guards, and two troops for the 2nd Lancers; M Battery, 3rd RHA, was to protect the divisional headquarters. Three troops of the 10th Battery, 2/3rd Australian Anti-Tank Regiment went to the advanced guard and two to the flank guards. The advanced guard was to rush the guns to the east at 6:15 a.m., before it was light enough for the Axis gunners to see. The force was to head east, where the siege were in greatest strength, to avoid a roundabout route through worse terrain and the risk of later interception. Few men slept and in the early morning, the noise of preparations seemed sure to alert the Axis troops nearby; a gusty wind blew up.

==== 8 April, break-out ====
The cruiser tank was late and Vaughan as delayed the move for fifteen minutes, dawn broke but despite this, the Axis troops appeared to have been surprised. The 24 vehicles of the KEO passed the Axis gun line, turned and charged. At the guns the squadron divided, each troop went round a flank and the infantry made a bayonet attack, scattering the crews of the twelve guns and supporting infantry. The Indians then remounted and drove off, having suffered 17 casualties, including at least two men killed. The 2nd Armoured Division headquarters also failed to appear at the start line and the others waited. As the Germans and Italians recovered from the surprise attack, the cruiser tank set off, the PAVO flank guards moved outwards to widen the gap and brigade headquarters followed. The cruiser charged at the guns, engaged them, was soon knocked out and the crew was killed. Zero hour for the Axis attack arrived and as Vaughan and the brigade headquarters group got going, guns to the east, south-east and south opened a rapid fire. Machine-gun fire raked the break-out route and German tanks approached from the south and east. The attack by the cruiser and clouds of dust raised by the movement of vehicles obscured the view and Vaughan, the headquarters and much of the PAVO broke out as the Axis attackers closed in. The troops at the head of the main body approached the jumping-off point but stopped when they saw tanks ahead and pulled back. The wind blew harder as the sun rose and swirling dust clouds made it impossible for the men inside the perimeter to see enough to know when to go.

The Australian anti-tank guns of G Troop were to remain in dug-in gun positions until the rearguard began to move and then portees would come up to collect the guns. Panzers attacked from the south-east, paused near a re-entrant and moved into line, a tank then advanced opposite one of the guns of G Troop, which opened rapid fire until the gun was blown up. More tanks followed and were engaged by another Australian gun. The tanks crossed the re-entrant under fire and several stopped then sheered off but 45 minutes after the Axis attack had begun, tanks reached the fort. The parties with Vaughan and Munro stopped on a rise to watch the breakout but saw no forces following. Vaughan called Gambier-Parry who replied that the fire was too heavy for the 106 soft-skinned vehicles. Vaughan suggested an attempt to the south and with Munro, drove back to the fort and the force outside the perimeter made for El Adem. Munro found knocked-out guns of the 11th Battery and several disabled light tanks nearby. With the main force trapped, Gambier-Parry ordered the 2nd Lancers to remain and cover the withdrawal of divisional headquarters to the west.

Vaughan found the vehicles facing west and suggested that they take the original eastwards route. Gambier-Parry agreed and the column set off into massed machine-gun fire. Gambier-Parry, mindful of the men in open trucks, surrendered. M Battery, 3rd RHA escorting them and several groups following, decided to breakout to the west by driving at full speed on a broad a front. Most of the vehicles that made the attempt got through by driving through field-artillery positions, whose crews put their hands up. At a long wadi, oblique to the route, most of the vehicles went right but some drove left, only to find that the wadi continued west and the party could not turn north and only one lorry of the party made it to Tobruk. The group on the right drove 20 mi (32 km) west, turned north in the early afternoon and hid in a wadi until dark. Late in the afternoon, an Axis scouting force approached but did not find them. The party moved off at 9:00 p.m., south-east for 50 mi (80 km), east for 100 mi (160 km), then north past an Axis encampment. While the brigade was resting at dawn on 9 April, a German and Italian supply convoy of about thirty men drove up and was captured. The British column moved off but had to abandon some of the prisoners, when their trucks broke down. A German scout car was captured and at about 5:00 p.m., armoured cars were briefly engaged, until recognised as the 11th Hussars, who led the way to El Adem; on 10 April, the party and four prisoners arrived in Tobruk.

The surrender ordered by Gambier-Parry was not seen by many troops because of the sandstorm and while waiting to move off the rest learnt only gradually and the last fighting ceased around 8:00 a.m. on 8 April. About 3,000 prisoners were taken, along with vehicles and the supply dumps, which were sufficient for an armoured division for thirty days. Rommel wrote later,

... any fully-motorised force whose organisational structure remains intact will normally and in suitable country be able to break out at will through an improvised ring. Thanks to his motorisation, the commander of the encircled force is in a position to concentrate his weight unexpectedly against any likely point in the ring and burst through it. This fact was repeatedly demonstrated in the desert.

— Rommel

The PAVO lost over half its strength during the breakout and the 2nd Royal Lancers was reduced to one squadron and amalgamated with the PAVO. The defence of Mechili delayed the Axis advance, making time for the 9th Australian Division to retreat to Tobruk and prepare its defences.

=== Tobruk ===
The KEO was sent as a divisional cavalry unit consisting of A Squadron (Jats), B Squadron (Jaipuri Muslims) and C Squadron (Rajputs) and a headquarters squadron, to the 9th Australian Division at Tobruk. On 10 April the Tobruk Defence Force was ordered back inside the perimeter and the KEO went into divisional reserve. On 19 April, the KEO occupied a section of the perimeter, from north of the Derna road to the sea. Three days later, A Squadron went 3 mi (4.8 km) west, to cover a raid by the Australians, who captured 730 Italian prisoners. (Note: The KEO noticed that Australian officers affected a walking stick and a Tommy Gun; the KEO followed the trend.) The KEO received 78 reinforcements and Walter Cowan, temporary captain and Admiral retired, who formed another squadron. The KEO was relieved on 26 August and sailed to Alexandria in three destroyers, under attack by Axis bombers.

=== Reconstitution ===
The remnants of the 2nd Lancers and PAVO were split up and used in the rear areas, to guard HQs. In August the 3rd Indian Motor Brigade now commanded by Brigadier A. A. E. Filose, was re-equipped at Mena in Egypt and in September the brigade moved to north-east Syria with the Free French, to repress the civilian population at Deir-ez-Zhor, under the command of the 31st Indian Armoured Division. In December, the Brigade also supplied men for the Indian Long Range Squadron. In February 1942, the brigade returned to Egypt, received the 2nd Field Regiment Royal Indian Artillery (RIA) and trained for three months in the desert.

=== Action at Point 171 ===
On 22 May, the brigade was taken under command by the 7th Armoured Division (Major-General Frank Messervy) and was sent 4 mi (6.4 km) south-east of Bir Hakeim to Point 171, to form a pivot for British tanks to manoeuvre around. The move would enable the motor brigades of the armoured divisions to return to their divisions and defeat an Axis attempt to outflank the main Gazala defences. (Note: The boxes were supposed to create a static framework for the tanks to manoeuvre and for rear-area units to use as refuges from marauding Axis tanks. The boxes were built at places of tactical significance, like passes and escarpments to deny them to opponents. If the boxes were occupied by divisions, they would be too far apart to cover minefields and these could easily be gapped by an attacker. By occupying them with brigades, they became vulnerable to irrelevance if ignored and defeat in detail if the British tanks failed.) Three days later, air reconnaissance reported much Axis traffic heading for the south end of the Gazala line. On 26 May, the brigade took post with the 2nd Royal Lancers along the south face of the defensive box, the KEO along the western side, the PAVO on the north face and the Sappers and Miners along the east face, with two troops of anti-tank guns; only thirty of the allotted anti-tank guns had reached the brigade when the Axis attacked. Inside the box were 24 field guns and a troop of six British 40 mm Bofors anti-aircraft guns. Valentine tanks of the 1st and 32nd Army Tank Brigades were promised to enable the motor brigades at Point 171, Bir Hakeim and Bir el Gubi, to withstand tank attacks but did not arrive before the Axis offensive. At 8:00 p.m. on 26 May, reports arrived that Axis columns behind an armoured car screen were to the south and south-east and the brigade dug in overnight.

At 6:30 a.m. on 27 May, Filose signalled to Messervy that the brigade was faced by "a whole bloody German armoured division", which turned out to be the Ariete Division and some tanks of the 21st Panzer Division. No German tanks participated in the battle as they were ordered further south by Rommel. Armoured cars on reconnaissance, reported 100 tanks and 900 other vehicles south and south-east of the brigade at 6:45 a.m. and fifteen minutes later that 40 tanks and 200 vehicles were 4 mi (6.4 km) to the north. The Indian artillery opened fire and the un-armoured vehicles of the Ariete Division withdrew. The Italian tanks formed up and wheeled north, which took them past the eastern face of Point 171. The Sappers and Miners engaged them and knocked out several tanks but lost all of their anti-tank guns. At 7:15 a.m., about sixty tanks attacked the west and south-west sections of the box and anti-tank fire forced them to turn away to the north and north-west. The tanks wheeled again and overran the KEO and the PAVO, which knocked out many tanks before losing most of the anti-tank guns. Several prisoners of the brigade were taken before the tanks moved off towards Acroma. Soon afterwards more tanks appeared and attacked the southern face, knocking out the anti-tank guns one-by-one. The Indian field artillery kept firing as the tanks collected prisoners and some carriers of the KEO arrived and charged the tanks in a rescue attempt.

The Italian tanks withdrew and infantry advanced. Five of the six Indian artillery troops were still operational but had expended most of their ammunition. Filose ordered the guns to disengage and the five remaining troops were driven out; in the confusion, two guns joined Axis columns and the crews were captured. Brigade signals, half of the 2nd Indian Field Regiment, the Bofors guns, the Sappers and Miners troop and remnants of the three regiments dodged past Axis columns and reached British positions in the evening. The brigade lost 211 men killed, many were wounded, 1,030 men were captured and the brigade claimed 52 tanks knocked out in three hours. On 28 May, the remnants of the brigade were sent back to Buq Buq to reform. (About 800 of the prisoners rejoined soon afterwards, because 600 men were released from captivity after 48 hours due to an Axis water-shortage and reached the Free French at Bir Hakeim; 200 men were liberated by a Jock Column.)

=== Aftermath ===
On 11 June, the 3rd Indian Motor Brigade moved west from Buq Buq and formed three columns under the 7th Armoured Division, with the 13th Duke of Connaught's Own Lancers armoured car regiment attached. After the fall of Tobruk the brigade formed part of the rearguard operating between Sidi Rezegh and Bir el Gubi. The brigade retired with the rest of the 7th Armoured Division to Sofafi over the border in Egypt and then to Mersa Matruh. Two columns arrived safely but the PAVO column ran into a minefield and then the 90th Light Division. The column broke away only to bog in soft sand; the troops managed to dig the vehicles out overnight and then ran into yet another Axis force at close range, then drove off north-east, only to find its way blocked by minefields with gaps covered by Axis forces and was caught in crossfire. Part of the PAVO column found a way through the minefield but the rest were captured. The 13th Lancers column found themselves caught between Axis forces to the north and a minefield to the south, shot their way out to the west, then turned south-west through Axis formations, during which the armoured cars ran into an Axis column, charged, knocked out four guns and took many prisoners.

The brigade received orders to return to Amirya for re-fitting and reached Fuka on 27 June. On 30 June the Brigade was ordered to hand over 50 per cent of its vehicles to the Eighth Army and the brigade was dispersed in July, for the defence of the Delta, then to perform guard duties. The brigade was reformed in August, minus the 2nd Field Regiment and travelled to Sahneh in Iran via Baghdad, returning to the command of the 31st Indian Armoured Division where it remained until late November, then moved to Shaibah, 7 mi (11 km) from Basra. In January 1943, the cavalry regiments returned to India and the brigade was reconstituted as the 43rd Indian Infantry Brigade (Lorried) at Shaibah. The cavalry regiments were replaced by the 2nd Battalion, 6th Gurkha Rifles, 2nd Battalion, 8th Gurkha Rifles and the 2nd Battalion, 10th Gurkha Rifles.

== Italy ==
=== Gothic Line ===
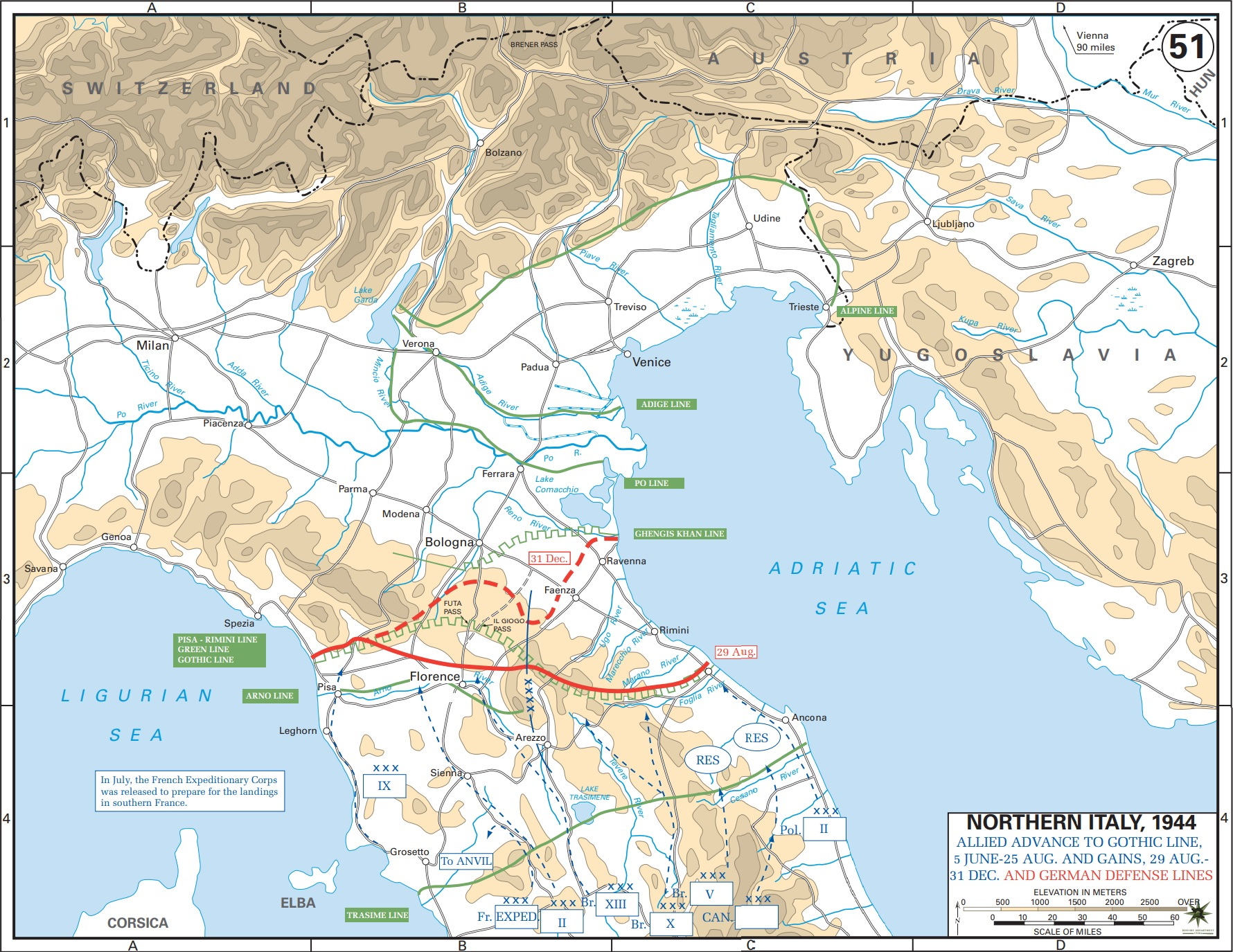
Map of the Gothic Line, 1944.

On 14 July 1944, the 43rd Gurkha Infantry Brigade (Lorried), which had been trained in mountain warfare, was made available to the Allied Armies in Italy (AAI), with the caveat that it was doubtful if it could be kept up to strength in Gurkhali-speaking British officers. On 21 July 1944, the brigade became part of the British 1st Armoured Division and joined on 2 August. The division moved forward to Senigallia and Castellone by 3 September, ready for the offensive against the Gothic Line but the route was so bad that 22 Sherman tanks broke down and many more were only kept going by running repairs. The 43rd Gurkha Infantry Brigade and the British 18th Infantry Brigade were a long way back from the front line, when the division prepared to attack over the Conca river and pass through the British 46th Infantry Division, once it captured crossings over the Marano.

On 12 September, the 1st Armoured Division participated in an attack on the Rimini Line with the two infantry brigades advancing between St. Savino and Passano opposite the 26th Panzer Division and 98th Infantry Division boundary. After two hours, the Gurkhas reached the St. Clemente ridge and captured Passano. The Gurkha attack was carefully planned using air photographs, which showed the number of hedge lines to be overcome to reach the objective. From 15 to 16 September, the Gurkhas crossed the Marano and captured their objectives round Case il Monte. The British 1st Armoured Division was broken up to reinforce other formations and the Gurkhas were transferred temporarily to the British 56th Infantry Division. On 11 October the brigade was transferred to the 10th Indian Infantry Division after one of its brigades was pinned down on the night of 7/8 October, by a German counter-attack on Mt. Farneto. The Gurkhas attacked on the left flank in difficult conditions and advanced north of Montecodruzzo in successive night attacks, to reach Mt. Chicco on 14 October.

=== Operation Grapeshot ===
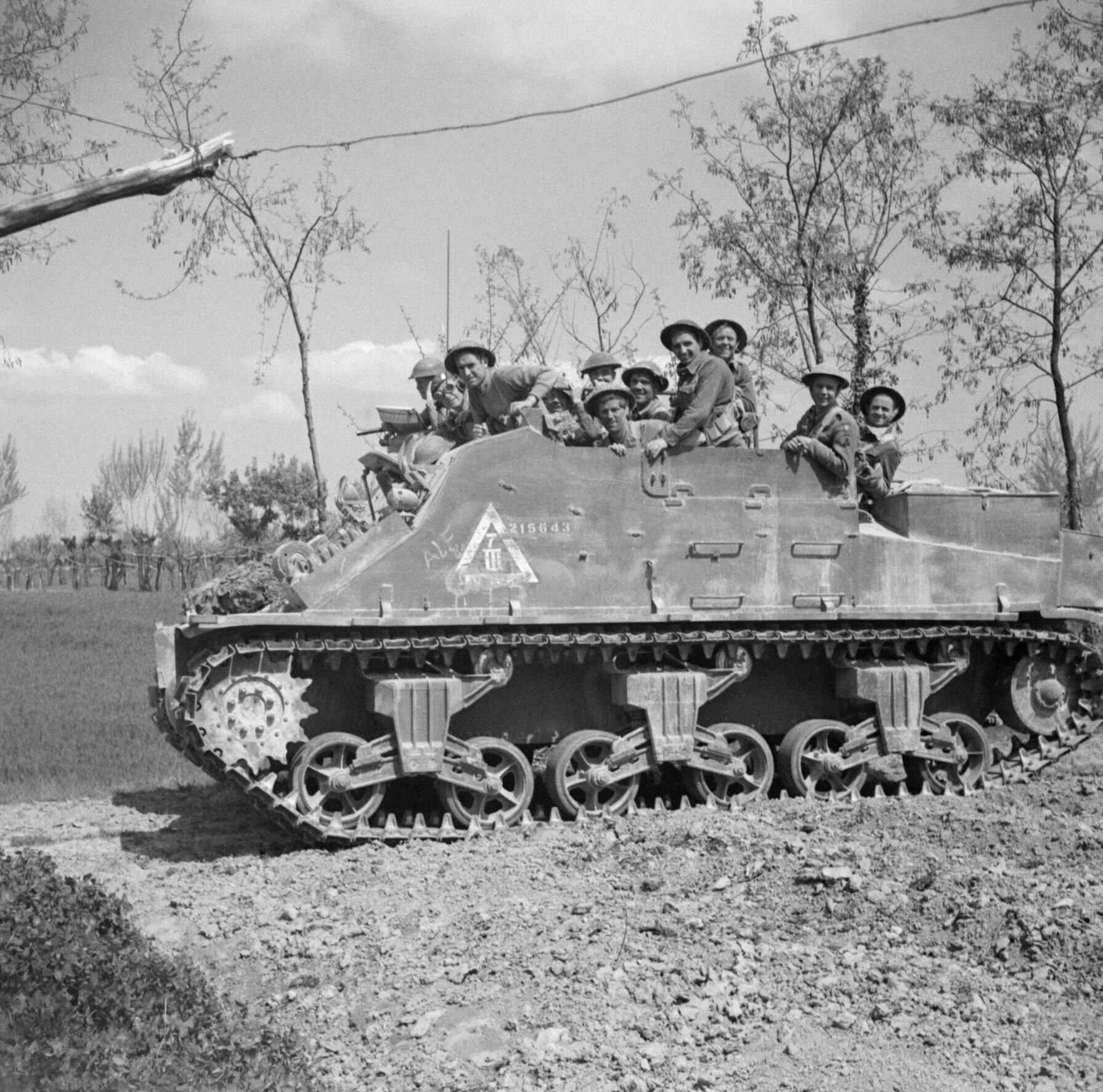
Kangaroo armoured personnel carrier (Conselice-19450413)

By the end of October, the Allied armies were held up in bad weather, the Eighth Army on the Ronco short of Forlì. A plan to capture the town with V Corps was devised in which the Ronco would be crossed and bridgeheads captured over the Montone near the Via Emilia, with the 10th Indian Division attacking on the right side of the road. On the night of 3/4 December, the 10th Indian Division participated in a decoy attack north of Faenza, which was so successful in diverting German attention that it was repeated the following day. On 7 December, V Corps was regrouped and the Gurkhas on the right flank moved south over the Lamone and relieved the 2nd New Zealand Division. On 13 December the Gurkhas went into reserve until 16 December and then joined in the V Corps advance, clearing Faenza to its northern edge. By the time of the 1945 Spring Offensive (Operation Grapeshot), the Gurkha brigade was under the command of the II Polish Corps and at the crossing of the Senio, the corps commander chose the Gurkhas as one of two pursuit groups to advance on Medicina on the right flank, in Kangaroo armoured personnel carriers and be ready quickly to move cross-country.

By 13 April, the Poles had consolidated a bridgehead over the Santerno but were not able to pass the two pursuit groups through, because of traffic jams and a lack of bridges. Three bridges were built and the Gurkhas got priority to cross but found a Polish armoured regiment in the way and it took until 7:20 a.m. on 14 April to get over and advance on the Sillaro river. An attempt to cross was defeated by massed fire on the crossing points and the attack was stopped until the night of 15/16 April. The next attack succeeded and the Gurkhas fought their way into Medicina by the evening and then command of the brigade was transferred to the 2nd New Zealand Division. The Gurkhas tried to cross the Gaiana river, where the Germans were thought to only be screening the front and got across but then withdrew that night, when tanks could not be brought over the river and the Gurkhas ran out of ammunition. A set-piece attack by the 2nd New Zealand Division began on 18 April, with a bombardment at 9:30 p.m. and a flame attack thirty minutes later.

The Gurkhas attacked on the left of the Medicina–Budrio railway and met little opposition, most of the German infantry having been killed by the artillery or incinerated. By 27 April, the Allies were across the River Po but the rains slowed the arrival of the Gurkhas, ready for an Eighth Army attempt to "gate-crash" the Venetian Line. The 2nd New Zealand Division was intended to lead the XIII Corps attack, since it had four infantry brigades but once over the river, German resistance collapsed. The Gurkhas relieved the 5th New Zealand Brigade north of the Adige river and met no opposition on the Piacenza–Este road but was much delayed by demolitions. After clearing the Germans from the area west of Route 16 as far as Padua, it passed to the command of XIII Corps on 29 April and began to take huge numbers of prisoners.

== Orders of Battle ==
=== Mechili ===
- 2nd Royal Lancers (Gardner's Horse)
- 11th PAVO (Frontier Force)
- 35th Field Squadron Bengal Sappers & Miners
- 3rd Light Field Ambulance
- 3rd Motor Brigade MT Company, RIASC
- 3rd Motor Brigade signals troop
- M Battery 3rd RHA (anti-tank)
- 2/3rd Australian Anti-Tank Regiment

=== Gazala ===
- 2nd Royal Lancers (Cavalry-Carrier: 2 × reconnaissance squadron, 1 × anti-tank squadron)
- 11th PAVO (Cavalry-Carrier: 2 × reconnaissance squadron, 1 × anti-tank squadron)
- 18th KEO (Cavalry-Carrier: 2 × reconnaissance squadron, 1 × anti-tank squadron)
- 3rd Indian Motor Brigade Anti-Tank Company: 16 × 2-pounder anti-tank guns
- 2nd Field Regiment IA: 16 × 25-pounder field gun
- 31st Bengal Field Squadron, IE

=== Reconstitution ===
- 2nd Royal Lancers (Gardner's Horse)
- 11th PAVO
- 18th KEO
- 31st Field Squadron Bengal Sappers & Miners
- 3rd Light Field Ambulance
- 3rd Motor Brigade MT Company, RIASC
- 3rd Motor Brigade signals troop
- 2nd Field Regiment, Indian Artillery

Cavalry Carrier Regiments

- 2 × reconnaissance squadrons
  - HQ: 3 × carriers, (3 × LMG)
    - 4 troops (12 men each): 3 × carriers, 3 × LMG (3 × anti-tank rifles)
  - 1 anti-tank squadron
    - 4 troops, 4 × carriers, 4 × 2-pounder anti-tank guns each (Anti-tank squadrons were at half-strength)

=== 43rd Indian Infantry Brigade (Lorried) ===
- 2nd Battalion, 6th Gurkha Rifles
- 2nd Battalion, 8th Gurkha Rifles
- 2nd Battalion, 10th Gurkha Rifles

== See also ==
- List of Indian Army Brigades in World War II
