= Nandlal Thapa =

Nepalese soldier (born 1902

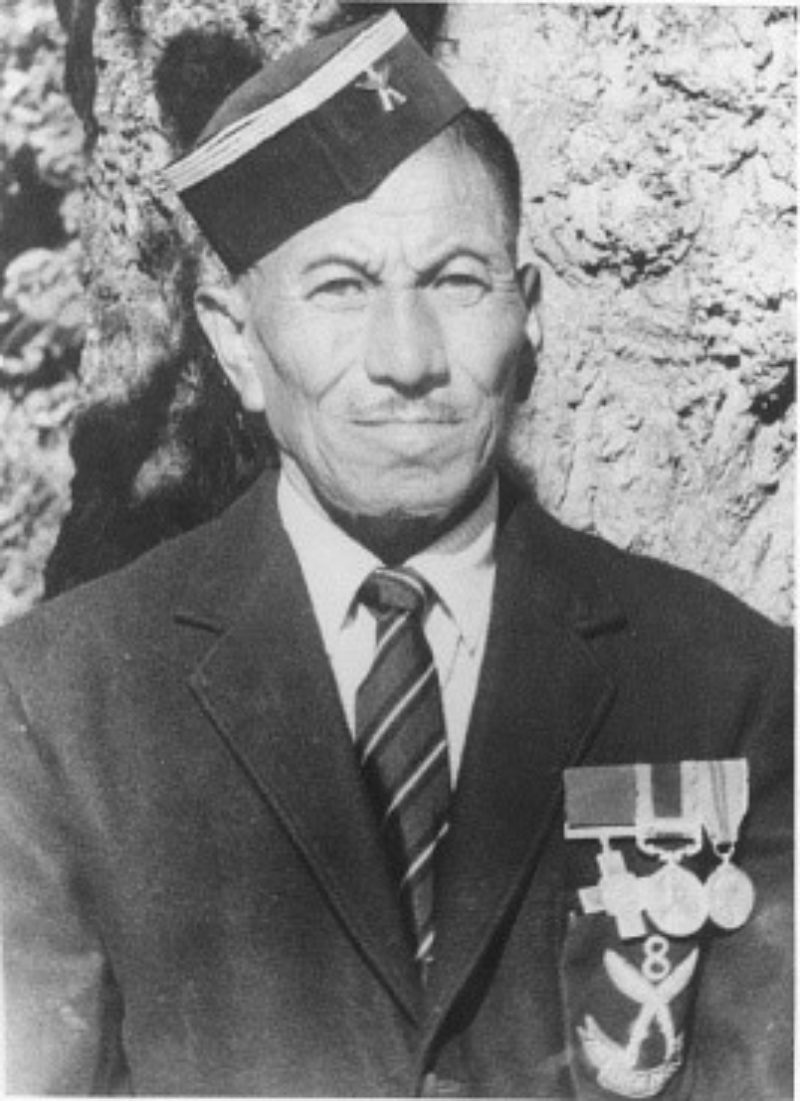
Nandlal Thapa wearing his medals, including the George Cross.

Nandlal Thapa, GC (12 July 1902 – 27 June 1987) was a Nepalese soldier in the British Indian Army who received the George Cross, the highest award bestowed by the British government for non-operational gallantry. As of April 2024, Thapa is the only Nepalese person to have been awarded the George Cross.

== Biography ==
Thapa was born in western Nepal. He enlisted in the 2 Bn, 8th Gurkha Rifles in December 1920. He was married and had a son.

== George Cross action and citation ==
At the rank of Naik, Nandlal Thapa was initially awarded the Empire Gallantry Medal (EGM) for the extraordinary bravery he displayed in conducting rescue operations right after the massive Quetta Earthquake of 31 May 1935. Lance Naik Chitrabahadur Gurung of 1/8 Gurkha Rifles was another recipient of the EGM for rescue operations in the same episode.

Nandlal Thapa's EGM citation reads as the following:

"The KING has been graciously pleased to approve of the Award of the Medal of the Military Division of the Most Excellent Order of the British Empire to the undermentioned for services rendered in connection with the recent earthquake in Baluchistan:– For Gallantry. No. 7506 Naik Nandlal Thapa, 2nd Battalion, 8th Gurkha Rifles, Indian Army. Naik Nandlal Thapa formed part of the leading detachment of the Battalion which was conveyed by Mechanical Transport from the Lines to Quetta City. There was no time for the party to collect tools. On arrival in the City the detachment was split up into small parties and worked with their hands for three hours, prior to the distribution of tools, extricating injured men and women from the débris. The area in which they worked was the junction of Bruce Road and Colvin Road, one of the parts most damaged by the earthquake. During this period minor shocks frequently occurred, causing further falls of masonry in the houses in which they were digging with their hands. Working with the party this Non-commissioned Officer showed conspicuous bravery in the manner in which he entered tottering buildings in search of living people and in the work and initiative he displayed in removing them. As a result of his disregard of danger ten people were rescued alive at considerable risk. He fully realised the risks he ran, but was always ready to enter any building where there was any possibility of anyone remaining alive. His conduct was a very fine example of courage and energy at a critical time."

In September 1940, following the creation of the George Cross, he was awarded a George Cross in place of the EGM. By that time, he had already retired from the army.

== Later life ==
After the completion of his service, Thapa returned to Nepal. He died at Dhaulagiri.

His George Cross is held in the collection of the Gurkha Museum, Winchester.

He finds a brief mention in J.P. Cross's autobiographical account of his life in Nepal.
