= Chitrabahadur Gurung =

Lance Naik Chitrabahadur Gurung, EGM (born ? - died 1939) was a Nepalese soldier in the British Indian Army, who was awarded the Empire Gallantry Medal for the extraordinary bravery he displayed in the rescue operations following the Quetta Earthquake of May 31, 1935. However, since he died in 1939, he could not exchange his EGM with the George Cross, which was instituted in the next year, and which the holders of the EGM were entitled to receive in exchange of their EGMs. He is one of the only two Nepalese persons to be awarded the Empire Gallantry Medal, the other being Nandlal Thapa, GC.

== Biography ==
Gurung served in the 1st Bn, 8th Gurkha Rifles. Gurung's EGM citation was published in The London Gazette on November 19, 1935
