= Sahneh =

City in Kermanshah province, Iran

Sahneh Persian: صحنه
- City
- Location within Iran
- Coordinates: 34°28′55″N 47°41′24″E
- Country: Iran
- Province: Kermanshah
- County: Sahneh
- District: Central

Population (2016)
  - Total: 35,508
- Time zone: UTC+3:30 (IRST)

Sahneh (Persian: صحنه) (Note: Also romanized as Şaḩneh and Sehneh; also known as Sahna; Kurdish: سه‌حنه) is a city in the Central District of Sahneh County, Kermanshah province, Iran, serving as capital of both the county and the district.

== Climate ==
Climate data for Sahneh (normals and extremes for Mar 2005-Mar 2022)
Month	Jan	Feb	Mar	Apr	May	Jun	Jul	Aug	Sep	Oct	Nov	Dec	Year
Record high °C (°F)	20.0 (68.0)	20.9 (69.6)	26.4 (79.5)	29.2 (84.6)	36.7 (98.1)	43.0 (109.4)	43.0 (109.4)	43.1 (109.6)	40.0 (104.0)	35.1 (95.2)	29.0 (84.2)	20.8 (69.4)	43.1 (109.6)
Mean daily maximum °C (°F)	9.1 (48.4)	9.7 (49.5)	14.6 (58.3)	18.7 (65.7)	24.7 (76.5)	33.0 (91.4)	37.6 (99.7)	38.3 (100.9)	34.9 (94.8)	28.3 (82.9)	18.8 (65.8)	12.1 (53.8)	23.3 (74.0)
Daily mean °C (°F)	4.1 (39.4)	7.7 (45.9)	8.9 (48.0)	13.6 (56.5)	17.9 (64.2)	24.3 (75.7)	28.8 (83.8)	29.8 (85.6)	26.2 (79.2)	20.0 (68.0)	12.8 (55.0)	7.0 (44.6)	16.8 (62.2)
Mean daily minimum °C (°F)	−0.7 (30.7)	0.1 (32.2)	3.1 (37.6)	6.4 (43.5)	10.7 (51.3)	15.5 (59.9)	20.0 (68.0)	21.3 (70.3)	17.4 (63.3)	11.9 (53.4)	6.8 (44.2)	1.6 (34.9)	9.5 (49.1)
Record low °C (°F)	−15.6 (3.9)	−12.8 (9.0)	−9.0 (15.8)	−8.0 (17.6)	1.2 (34.2)	6.6 (43.9)	12.2 (54.0)	11.6 (52.9)	8.2 (46.8)	1.4 (34.5)	−2.0 (28.4)	−7.2 (19.0)	−15.6 (3.9)
Average precipitation mm (inches)	58.5 (2.30)	74.6 (2.94)	71.9 (2.83)	77.4 (3.05)	52.2 (2.06)	5.6 (0.22)	0.2 (0.01)	0.3 (0.01)	0.5 (0.02)	12.9 (0.51)	61.6 (2.43)	67.5 (2.66)	483.2 (19.04)
Average precipitation days	6.7	12.2	10.2	10.8	8.8	2.4	0.2	0.7	0.6	2.4	10.1	9.8	74.9
Average relative humidity (%)	67.5	67.4	58.9	57.5	50.3	33.1	26.4	23.9	26.2	34.4	58	67.3	47.6
Mean monthly sunshine hours	176	168.5	188.6	219.8	237.7	333.8	346.3	332.1	321.6	271.9	196.8	196.9	2,990
Source: Kermanshah Meteorological Office (precipitation 1958-2022, sun 2005-2012)

== Demographics ==
=== Language ===
The city is mostly Kurdish speaking.

=== Population ===
At the time of the 2006 National Census, the city's population was 34,133 in 8,861 households. The following census in 2011 counted 36,542 people in 10,594 households. The 2016 census measured the population of the city as 35,508 people in 10,985 households.

== Notable residents ==
Kioumars Heydari, General
