= Mir Azizi, Ravansar =

Mir Azizi ميرعزيزي
- Village
- Location within Iran
- Coordinates: 34°34′19″N 46°41′06″E
- Country: Iran
- Province: Kermanshah
- County: Ravansar
- Bakhsh: Central
- Rural District: Hasanabad

Population (2006)
  - Total: 84
- Time zone: UTC+3:30 (IRST)
  - Summer (DST): UTC+4:30 (IRDT)

Mir Azizi (Persian: ميرعزيزي, also Romanized as Mīr ‘Azīzī) is a village in Hasanabad Rural District, in the Central District of Ravansar County, Kermanshah Province, Iran. At the 2006 census, its population was 84, in 18 families.
