= Mal Amiri-ye Hajj Saadat Karam =

Mal Amiri-ye Hajj Saadat Karam مال اميري حاج سعادت كرم
- Village
- Location within Iran
- Coordinates: 34°28′38″N 47°26′43″E
- Country: Iran
- Province: Kermanshah
- County: Harsin
- Bakhsh: Bisotun
- Rural District: Cham Chamal

Population (2006)
  - Total: 111
- Time zone: UTC+3:30 (IRST)
  - Summer (DST): UTC+4:30 (IRDT)

Mal Amiri-ye Hajj Saadat Karam (Persian: مال اميري حاج سعادت كرم, also Romanized as Māl Amīrī-ye Ḩajj Sa‘ādat Karam; also known as Māl-e Amīrī) is a village in Cham Chamal Rural District, Bisotun District, Harsin County, Kermanshah Province, Iran. At the 2006 census, its population was 111, in 25 families.
