= Siah Choqai-ye Sofla =

Siah Choqai-ye Sofla سياه چقاي سفلي
- Village
- Location within Iran
- Coordinates: 34°12′27″N 46°55′00″E
- Country: Iran
- Province: Kermanshah
- County: Kermanshah
- Bakhsh: Mahidasht
- Rural District: Mahidasht

Population (2006)
  - Total: 68
- Time zone: UTC+3:30 (IRST)
  - Summer (DST): UTC+4:30 (IRDT)

Siah Choqai-ye Sofla (Persian: سياه چقاي سفلي, also Romanized as Sīāh Choqāī-ye Soflá; also known as Sīāh Choqā-ye Soflá) is a village in Mahidasht Rural District, Mahidasht District, Kermanshah County, Kermanshah Province, Iran. At the 2006 census, its population was 68, in 19 families.
