= Siah Choqai-ye Olya =

Siah Choqai-ye Olya سياه چقاي عليا
- Village
- Location within Iran
- Coordinates: 34°12′09″N 46°55′13″E
- Country: Iran
- Province: Kermanshah
- County: Kermanshah
- Bakhsh: Mahidasht
- Rural District: Mahidasht

Population (2006)
  - Total: 33
- Time zone: UTC+3:30 (IRST)
  - Summer (DST): UTC+4:30 (IRDT)

Siah Choqai-ye Olya (Persian: سياه چقاي عليا, also Romanized as Sīāh Choqāī-ye ‘Olyā; also known as Sīāh Choqā-ye ‘Olyā) is a village in Mahidasht Rural District, Mahidasht District, Kermanshah County, Kermanshah Province, Iran. At the 2006 census, its population was 33, in 9 families.
