= Mir Azizi, Eslamabad-e Gharb =

Mir Azizi ميرعزيزي
- Village
- Location within Iran
- Coordinates: 34°04′28″N 46°40′36″E
- Country: Iran
- Province: Kermanshah
- County: Eslamabad-e Gharb
- Bakhsh: Central
- Rural District: Shiyan

Population (2006)
  - Total: 846
- Time zone: UTC+3:30 (IRST)
  - Summer (DST): UTC+4:30 (IRDT)

Mir Azizi (Persian: ميرعزيزي, also Romanized as Mīr ‘Azīzī; also known as Mīrāzi) is a village in Shiyan Rural District, in the Central District of Eslamabad-e Gharb County, Kermanshah Province, Iran. At the 2006 census, its population was 846, in 191 families.
