= Garus, Kohgiluyeh and Boyer-Ahmad =

Garus گروس
- Village
- Location within Iran
- Coordinates: 30°21′58″N 51°07′10″E
- Country: Iran
- Province: Kohgiluyeh and Boyer-Ahmad
- County: Basht
- Bakhsh: Basht
- Rural District: Babuyi

Population (2006)
  - Total: 94
- Time zone: UTC+3:30 (IRST)
  - Summer (DST): UTC+4:30 (IRDT)

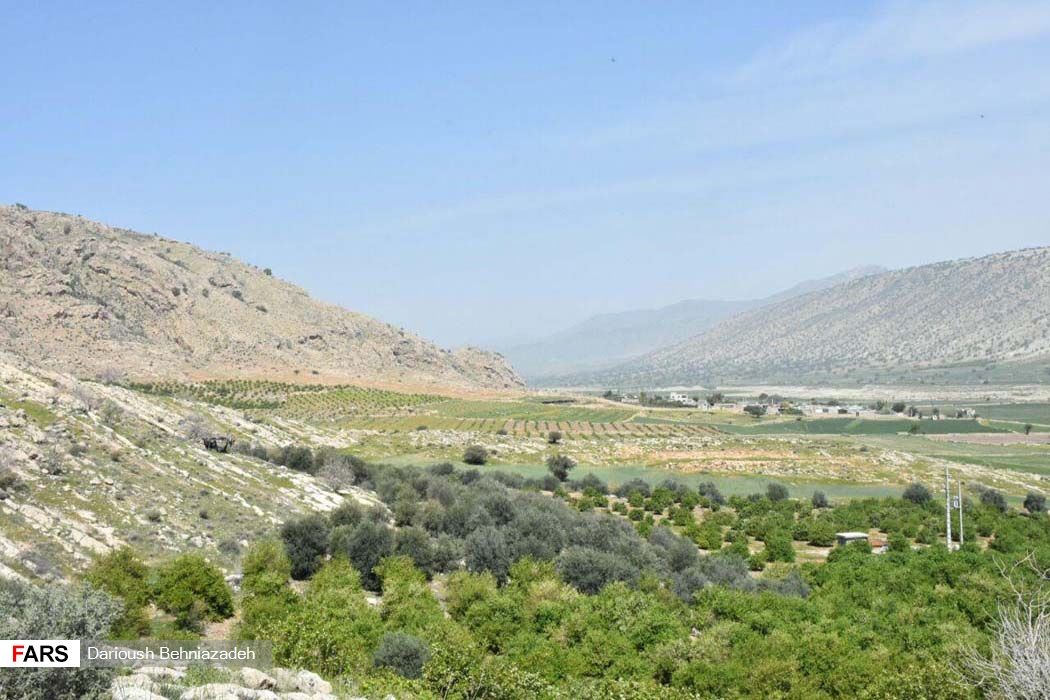
Village of Garus

Garus (Persian: گروس, also Romanized as Garūs and Garrūs) is a village in Babuyi Rural District, Basht District, Basht County, Kohgiluyeh and Boyer-Ahmad Province, Iran. At the 2006 census, its population was 94, in 20 families.
