= Samang =

Samang سمنگ
- Village
- Location within Iran
- Coordinates: 29°11′17″N 52°16′08″E
- Country: Iran
- Province: Fars
- County: Firuzabad
- Bakhsh: Meymand
- Rural District: Dadenjan

Population (2006)
  - Total: 105
- Time zone: UTC+3:30 (IRST)
  - Summer (DST): UTC+4:30 (IRDT)

Samang (Persian: سمنگ; also known as Samangan) is a village in Dadenjan Rural District, Meymand District, Firuzabad County, Fars province, Iran. At the 2006 census, its population was 105, in 21 families.
