= Sheykhabad, Kerman =

Sheykhabad شيخ اباد
- Village
- Country: Iran
- Province: Kerman
- County: Anbarabad
- Bakhsh: Jebalbarez-e Jonubi
- Rural District: Garmsar

Population (2006)
  - Total: 19
- Time zone: UTC+3:30 (IRST)
  - Summer (DST): UTC+4:30 (IRDT)

Sheykhabad (Persian: شيخ اباد, also Romanized as Sheykhābād) is a village in Garmsar Rural District, Jebalbarez-e Jonubi District, Anbarabad County, Kerman Province, Iran. At the 2006 census, its population was 19, in 6 families.
