= Samangan, Kermanshah =

Samangan سمنگان
- Village
- Location within Iran
- Coordinates: 34°34′51″N 46°47′32″E
- Country: Iran
- Province: Kermanshah
- County: Ravansar
- Bakhsh: Central
- Rural District: Hasanabad

Population (2006)
  - Total: 141
- Time zone: UTC+3:30 (IRST)
  - Summer (DST): UTC+4:30 (IRDT)

Samangan (Persian: سمنگان, also romanized as Samangān) is a village in Hasanabad Rural District, in the Central District of Ravansar County, Kermanshah Province, Iran. At the 2006 census, its population was 141, in 29 families.
