= Sheykhabad-e Chah Hajji =

Sheykhabad-e Chah Hajji شيخ ابادچاه حاجي
- Village
- Location within Iran
- Coordinates: 27°57′21″N 57°43′20″E
- Country: Iran
- Province: Kerman
- County: Kahnuj
- Bakhsh: Central
- Rural District: Howmeh

Population (2006)
  - Total: 349
- Time zone: UTC+3:30 (IRST)
  - Summer (DST): UTC+4:30 (IRDT)

Sheykhabad-e Chah Hajji (Persian: شيخ ابادچاه حاجي, also Romanized as Sheykhābād-e Chāh Ḩājjī; also known as Sheikh Abad Kahnooj, Sheykhābād, and Sheykhābād-e Kahnūj) is a village in Howmeh Rural District, in the Central District of Kahnuj County, Kerman Province, Iran. At the 2006 census, its population was 349, in 88 families.
