= Sefid Choqa, Kermanshah =

Sefid Choqa سفيدچقا
- Village
- Location within Iran
- Coordinates: 34°26′45″N 46°52′32″E
- Country: Iran
- Province: Kermanshah
- County: Kermanshah
- Bakhsh: Central
- Rural District: Baladarband

Population (2006)
  - Total: 153
- Time zone: UTC+3:30 (IRST)
  - Summer (DST): UTC+4:30 (IRDT)

Sefid Choqa (Persian: سفيدچقا, also Romanized as Sefīd Choqā; also known as Sefīd Choqā-ye Do Deh) is a village in Baladarband Rural District, in the Central District of Kermanshah County, Kermanshah Province, Iran. At the 2006 census, its population was 153, in 31 families.
