= Mir Azizi-ye Qadim =

Mir Azizi-ye Qadim ميرعزيزي قديم
- Village
- Location within Iran
- Coordinates: 34°28′33″N 46°39′03″E
- Country: Iran
- Province: Kermanshah
- County: Kermanshah
- Bakhsh: Kuzaran
- Rural District: Sanjabi

Population (2006)
  - Total: 231
- Time zone: UTC+3:30 (IRST)
  - Summer (DST): UTC+4:30 (IRDT)

Mir Azizi-ye Qadim (Persian: ميرعزيزي قديم, also Romanized as Mīr ‘Azīzī-ye Qadīm) is a village in Sanjabi Rural District, Kuzaran District, Kermanshah County, Kermanshah Province, Iran. At the 2006 census, its population was 231, in 47 families.
