= 8th Gorkha Rifles =

Regiment of the Indian Army

- Active: 1824 – Present
- Country: India
- Branch: Indian Army
- Type: Rifles
- Size: 6 Battalions
- Regimental Centre: 58 Gorkha Training Centre, Shillong, Meghalaya
- Nickname: The Shiny Eight
- Motto: Kayar Hunu Bhanda Marnu Ramro (Better to die than live like a coward)
- Colors: Green; faced black
- March: War Cry: Jai Maa Kali, Ayo Gorkhali (Hail Mother Kali, The Gorkhas are here)
- Engagements: First Anglo–Burmese War; Bhutan War; World War I World War II; Sino-Indian war Indo-Pakistani War of 1965; Indo-Pakistani War of 1971; Kargil War; Operation Khukri
- Decorations: 4 Victoria Crosses; 1 George Cross; 1 Param Vir Chakra; 4 Ashoka Chakras; 1 Padma Vibhushan; 1 Padma Bhushan; 4 Param Vishist Seva Medals; 7 Maha Vir Chakras; 1 Uttam Yudh Seva Medal; 2 Kirti Chakras; 8 Ati Vishist Seva Medals and 1 Bar; 22 Vir Chakras; 13 Shaurya Chakras; 1 Yudh Seva Medal; 34 Sena Medals; 12 Vishist Seva Medals
- Battle honours: Post Independence; Punch; Chushul; Sanjoi and Mirpur; Theatre Honours; Jammu & Kashmir 1948; Ladakh 1962; Jammu & Kashmir, 1965

Commanders
- Colonel of the Regiment: Brigadier C Kartik Seshadri, VSM
- Notable commanders: Field Marshal Sam Manekshaw

Insignia
- Regimental Insignia: A pair of crossed Khukris with the numeral 8 above
- Tartan: Government (pipe bags and ribbons)

The 8th Gorkha Rifles is a Gorkha regiment of the Indian Army. It was raised in 1824 as part of the British East India Company and later transferred to the British Indian Army after the Indian Rebellion of 1857. The regiment served in World War I and World War II, before being one of the six (of ten) Gurkha regiments transferred to the Indian Army after independence in 1947. Since then it has served in a number of conflicts including the Sino-Indian War of 1962 and the Indo-Pakistan wars of 1965 and 1971. Today the 8th Gorkha Rifles is one of the most celebrated regiments of the Indian Army, having received numerous citations for bravery in the field of battle, and even producing one of the two field marshals of India, Field Marshal Sam Manekshaw, of the Indian Army.

== History ==
=== Formation and early campaigns ===
The 16th Sylhet Local Battalion, a unit of the British East India Company that was formed in 1824, can be traced as the regiment's ancestor. The first designation change came in 1826 when the unit was redesignated the 11th Sylhet Local Battalion. In 1861, it became part of the Bengal Native Infantry and was briefly designated the 48th (Sylhet) Light Infantry, before its numerical designation was changed to the 44th. A number of minor name changes occurred until 1886 when the Goorkha title was adopted and the regiment became the 44th Regiment of Goorkha (Light) Infantry. In 1891, the regiment's title was adjusted to 44th Gurkha (Rifle) Regiment of Bengal Infantry. The designation of the 8th Gurkha Rifles was adopted in 1903, but it remained a single battalion regiment until 1907, the regiment gained a second battalion, subsuming the 43rd Gurkhas, which had been briefly redesignated as the 7th Gurkha Rifles.

Military assignments commenced as soon after the raising of the regiment when the first battalion formed the spearhead for operations in the First Anglo–Burmese War of 1824–1825. The services of the regiment were to be requisitioned again when the British went to war with Bhutan in 1864. Two battalion columns of the regiment sallied forth, shoulder to shoulder to crush the Bhutanese revolts and the stronghold of Devnageri. The first Victoria Cross (VC), awarded to Richard Ridgeway, came to the regiment as a result of an action on 22 November 1879, in its first ever operational mission when its units were summoned to deal with Nagaland Rebels. This was the first time that a regular army unit was ever been employed in the Naga hills.

The regiment's second Victoria Cross was awarded to Charles Grant, for his actions during the Manipur Expedition on the North-East Frontier on 27 March 1891 whilst attached to the 2nd Battalion. Following the disaster at Manipur, Grant volunteered to attempt the relief of the British who were being held captive with a force of 80 Gurkhas. Inspiring his men with his example of personal daring and resource, the lieutenant captured Thobal, near Manipur, from a force of 800 Manipuris on 30 March 1891. For the next ten days Grant and his small force held Thobal, before on 9 April 1891, having run out of food and having almost no ammunition left, they were forced to abandon the position. In his report following the incident, Lieutenant Grant recommended every member of his party be awarded the Indian Order of Merit, which was at that time the highest award a native member of the British Indian Army could be awarded. This recommendation was later accepted and all of Grant's men were also rewarded with six months pay and allowances.

The Younghusband Expedition of 1904 was another operation that brought a VC to the regiment, awarded to John Duncan Grant—no relation to Charles Grant—for his actions during the British expedition to Tibet. Braving the high altitude climes of Tibet, the expeditionary force successfully stormed the Tibetan fortress of Gyantse at 18,000 feet.

=== World War I ===
World War I (1914–1918) testified to the valour and heroism of the regiment during the course of combat service in Italy, France, Mesopotamia (present-day Iraq) and Egypt. During the fighting in France, the 2nd/8th distinguished itself by fighting almost to the last man during the Battle of Loos on 25 September 1915, hurling themselves time after time against the German defences. Having mustered almost eight hundred men to begin with, by the end of the day they had a strength of just one officer and forty-nine men.

The regiment won 14 battle honours during this period:

- La Bassee, Festubert, Givenchy, Neauve Chapelle, Aubers, France and Flanders 1914–15; Egypt, Megiddo, Sharon, Palestine, Tigris, Kut-at-Amara, Baghdad, Mesopotamia 1916–18.

Following the war, it also participated in the Third Afghan War, earning the Afghanistan 1919 battle honour.

=== Inter war years ===
During the years between the two World Wars, the 8th Goorkhas were based in India, where they undertook various garrison duties, in between service on the North West Frontier. It was whilst the 2/8th was based at Quetta in the mid-1930s that a member of the Regiment would display outstanding courage, this time not during war but during peace. In 1935 a series of powerful earthquakes rocked north-west India and thousands of people were killed. The men of the 2/8th worked tirelessly in their efforts to help free many of the civilians that were caught beneath the ruins. Nandlal Thapa received the Empire Gallantry Medal (EGM) for repeatedly risking his life entering buildings that were in danger of collapsing amidst the aftershocks in order to rescue injured survivors. Chitrabahadur Gurung received the same medal for retrieving a British couple from deep rubble. At the time the EGM was the highest award for gallantry for actions performed not in the face of the enemy, although later when the George Cross (GC) came into being in 1940, Nandlal Thapa received the GC to replace his EGM. Gurung died in 1939, so he could not get his EGM exchanged for a GC.

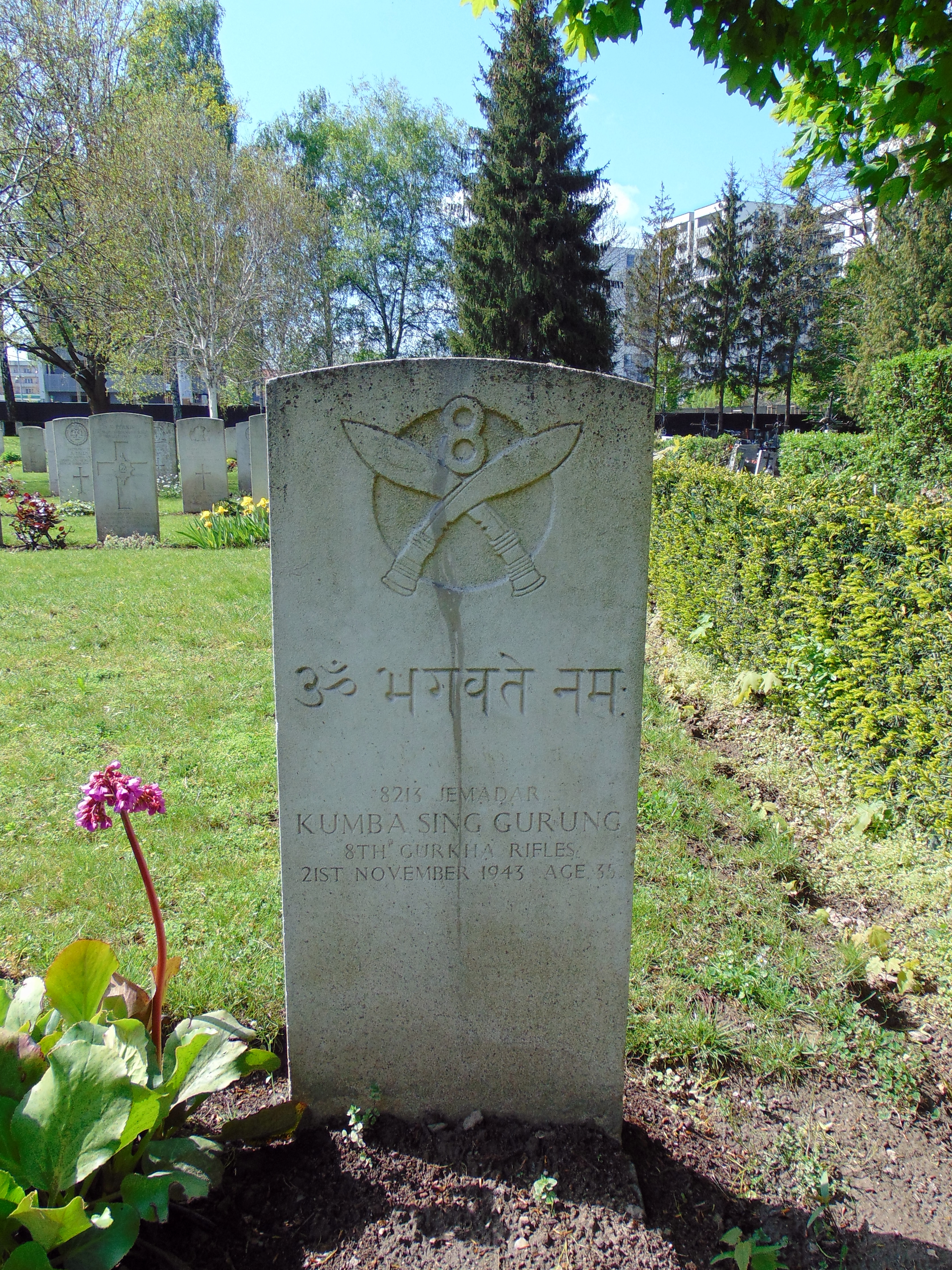
The grave of a soldier of the 8th Gurkha Rifle Regiment, fighting in Africa in Al-Alamajn, he died in camp Stalag VIII-B

=== World War II ===
The regiment's battalions also saw active overseas actions in Iraq, Egypt, Libya, Tobruk, El Alamein and Burma during World War II where the regiment earned twenty-two battle honours. In January 1943, the 2nd Battalion was attached to the 3rd Indian Motor Brigade which had just returned from the Western Desert after having been almost destroyed at the Battle of Gazala. At the end of the month the brigade was renamed as the 43rd Indian Infantry Brigade (Lorried). The brigade and its Gurkha battalions were sent to Italy in mid-1944 as an independent brigade. On 12 May 1945, Lachhiman Gurung was awarded the regiment's fourth VC for his actions at Taungdaw, Burma.

The regiment's World War II battle honours include:

- Iraq 1941, North Africa 1940–43, Gothic Line, Coriano, Sant' Angelo, Gaiana Crossing, Point 551, Italy 1942–44; Tamu Road, Bishenpur, Kanglato-ngbi, Mandalay, Myinmu Bridgehead, Singhu, Shan-datgyi, Sittang, Imphal, Tanbingon, and Burma 1942–45.

=== Post independence ===
The 8th Gurkha Rifles, along with the 1st, 3rd, 4th, 5th, and 9th Gurkha Rifles, was transferred to India on independence in 1947. The regiment became one of the Gorkha regiments (India) when the spelling was changed for all of the transferred regiments.

==== Kashmir operations ====
Soon after partition, the 2/8 Gorkha Rifles saw action in the Leh operations of 1948. The battalion made a forced march over inhospitable terrain and reached Leh. Major Hari Chand and his company were involved in a series of raids that demoralized the Pakistani forces, this included destruction of the Pakistani mountain guns at the village of Basgo which had been brought in to consolidate the raiders hold over Leh. In this action, Major Hari Chand and four other ranks were awarded the Maha Vir Chakra (MVC) and Vir Chakra (VRC) respectively.

==== Sino-Indian war of 1962 ====
One Param Vir Chakra was awarded to Major Dhan Singh Thapa, of the 1/8 Gorkha Rifles, during the Sino Indian War. To date this is the only recipient of the Param Vir Chakra for the regiment.

==== Later period ====
The regiment was also involved in the 1965 and 1971 Indo-Pakistan conflicts during which members of the regiment were awarded 4 Maha Vir Chakras. The regiment was also actively involved in the operations in Sri Lanka where again members of the regiment were awarded for gallantry winning one Maha Vir Chakra and four Vir Chakras.

In 2000, the 5/8, while performing duty in Sierra Leone was involved in Operation Khukri and played a pivotal role.

When the 1/8 became a Mechanised Infantry Regiment, a further battalion was raised on July 1, 1979, and named the 7/8 Gorkha Rifles.

== Battalions ==
- 1/8 Gorkha Rifles (later became the 3rd Battalion, Mechanised Infantry Regiment) (PVC Paltan)
- 2/8 Gorkha Rifles (George Cross Battalion)
- 3/8 Gorkha Rifles
- 4/8 Gorkha Rifles ( VC Paltan )
- 5/8 Gorkha Rifles (formerly the 4th Battalion, 2nd King Edward VII's Own Gurkha Rifles (The Sirmoor Rifles))
- 6/8 Gorkha Rifles
- 7/8 Gorkha Rifles

== Notable officers ==
Frederick George Lister of the Sylhet Light Infantry is considered the father of the regiment by leading it from 1828 to 1854. He oversaw campaigns in the Khasi Hills, Lushai Hills and annexation of the Jaintia Kingdom.

The regiment produced the first Field Marshal and Chief of Army Staff, Field Marshal Sam Manekshaw MC who is incidentally the most celebrated personality of the regiment. His contribution in the 1971 Indo-Pakistani War is a legend in the military history of India's Armed Forces. In addition to Manekshaw, the Regiment has produced a number of army commanders in independent India.
