= Hojr Rural District =

Rural district in Kermanshah province, Iran

Hojr Rural District Persian: دهستان هجر
- Rural District
- Location within Iran
- Coordinates: 34°29′32″N 47°33′26″E
- Country: Iran
- Province: Kermanshah
- County: Sahneh
- District: Central
- Capital: Samangan-e Olya

Population (2016)
  - Total: 6,768
- Time zone: UTC+3:30 (IRST)

Hojr Rural District (Persian: دهستان هجر) is in the Central District of Sahneh County, Kermanshah province, Iran. Its capital is the village of Samangan-e Olya.

== Demographics ==
=== Population ===
At the time of the 2006 National Census, the rural district's population was 7,007 in 1,699 households. There were 7,211 inhabitants in 2,043 households at the following census of 2011. The 2016 census measured the population of the rural district as 6,768 in 1,938 households. The most populous of its 29 villages was Elahiyeh, with 1,541 people.
