= Sahneh Rural District =

Rural district in Kermanshah province, Iran

Sahneh Rural District Persian: دهستان صحنه
- Rural District
- Location within Iran
- Coordinates: 34°26′03″N 47°44′35″E
- Country: Iran
- Province: Kermanshah
- County: Sahneh
- District: Central
- Capital: Derkeh

Population (2016)
  - Total: 4,503
- Time zone: UTC+3:30 (IRST)

Sahneh Rural District (Persian: دهستان صحنه) is in the Central District of Sahneh County, Kermanshah province, Iran. Its capital is the village of Derkeh.

== Demographics ==
=== Population ===
At the time of the 2006 National Census, the rural district's population was 4,960 in 1,185 households. There were 5,186 inhabitants in 1,408 households at the following census of 2011. The 2016 census measured the population of the rural district as 4,503 in 1,435 households. The most populous of its 21 villages was Derkeh, with 956 people.
