= Khodabandehlu Rural District =

Rural district in Kermanshah province, Iran

Khodabandehlu Rural District Persian: دهستان خدابنده لو
- Rural District
- Location within Iran
- Coordinates: 34°35′40″N 47°43′01″E
- Country: Iran
- Province: Kermanshah
- County: Sahneh
- District: Central
- Capital: Dehlaqin

Population (2016)
  - Total: 2,177
- Time zone: UTC+3:30 (IRST)

Khodabandehlu Rural District (Persian: دهستان خدابنده لو) is in the Central District of Sahneh County, Kermanshah province, Iran. Its capital is the village of Dehlaqin.

== Demographics ==
=== Population ===
At the time of the 2006 National Census, the rural district's population was 3,389 in 885 households. There were 2,939 inhabitants in 876 households at the following census of 2011. The 2016 census measured the population of the rural district as 2,177 in 660 households. The most populous of its 26 villages was Eslamabad-e Sofla, with 419 people.
