= Gamasiyab Rural District (Sahneh County) =

Rural district in Kermanshah province, Iran

Gamasiyab Rural District Persian: دهستان گاماسياب
- Rural District
- Location within Iran
- Coordinates: 34°24′00″N 47°35′24″E
- Country: Iran
- Province: Kermanshah
- County: Sahneh
- District: Central
- Capital: Gavgol-e Olya

Population (2016)
  - Total: 5,228
- Time zone: UTC+3:30 (IRST)

Gamasiyab Rural District (Persian: دهستان گاماسياب) is in the Central District of Sahneh County, Kermanshah province, Iran. Its capital is the village of Gavgol-e Olya.

== Demographics ==
=== Population ===
At the time of the 2006 National Census, the rural district's population was 6,365 in 1,434 households. There were 6,330 inhabitants in 1,766 households at the following census of 2011. The 2016 census measured the population of the rural district as 5,228 in 1,587 households. The most populous of its 23 villages was Ali Gorzan-e Olya, with 559 people.
