= Sahneh County =

County in Kermanshah province, Iran

Sahneh County Persian: شهرستان صحنه
- County
- Location of Sahneh County in Kermanshah province (right, green)

- Location of Kermanshah province in Iran
- Coordinates: 34°34′N 47°31′E
- Country: Iran
- Province: Kermanshah
- Capital: Sahneh
- Districts: Central, Dinavar

Population (2016)
  - Total: 70,757
- Time zone: UTC+3:30 (IRST)

Sahneh County (Persian: شهرستان صحنه) is in Kermanshah province, Iran. Its capital is the city of Sahneh.

== Demographics ==
=== Population ===
At the time of the 2006 National Census, the county's population was 75,827 in 19,106 households.

The following census in 2011 counted 76,678 people in 22,052 households.

The 2016 census measured the population of the county as 70,757 in 21,788 households.

=== Administrative divisions ===
Sahneh County's population history and administrative structure over three consecutive censuses are shown in the following table.

Sahneh County Population
Administrative Divisions	2006	2011	2016
Central District	55,854	58,208	54,184
Gamasiyab RD	6,365	6,330	5,228
Hojr RD	7,007	7,211	6,768
Khodabandehlu RD	3,389	2,939	2,177
Sahneh RD	4,960	5,186	4,503
Sahneh (city)	34,133	36,542	35,508
Dinavar District	19,973	18,452	16,344
Dinavar RD	9,143	8,603	7,924
Horr RD	5,261	4,692	3,998
Kanduleh RD	5,080	4,559	3,727
Miyan Rahan (city)	489	598	695
Total	75,827	76,678	70,757
RD = Rural District

=== Language ===
Kurdish is widely spoken in Sahneh county In central district people speak Sahneh'i Kurdish which is a sub dialect of Southern Kurdish, and also in dinavar district people speak Dinavari Kurdish which is that close to Kulyayi kurdish spoken in Sonqor county that sometimes they are classified as the same sub dialect of Southern Kurdish. Laki sub dialect of Southern kurdish is also spoken in the very south of the Sahneh county alongside the border with Harsin county.

=== Religion ===
More than 90% of the people of sahneh are Yarsani. And the rest of the population is Shia muslim

== Géography ==
The city's longitude is 47.68.72 and its latitude is 34.48.44. Le comté de Sahneh has numerous fruit orchards. The main source of water in this city is Sarab Sahneh. This region has many rivers and springs, which make it a fertile land with a temperate climate.

== See also ==
Media related to Sahneh County at Wikimedia Commons
