= Central District (Sahneh County) =

District in Kermanshah province, Iran

Central District (Sahneh County) Persian: بخش مرکزی شهرستان صحنه
- District
- Location within Iran
- Coordinates: 34°30′35″N 47°38′21″E
- Country: Iran
- Province: Kermanshah
- County: Sahneh
- Capital: Sahneh

Population (2016)
  - Total: 54,184
- Time zone: UTC+3:30 (IRST)

The Central District of Sahneh County (Persian: بخش مرکزی شهرستان صحنه) is in Kermanshah province, Iran. Its capital is the city of Sahneh.

== Demographics ==
=== Population ===
At the time of the 2006 National Census, the district's population was 55,854 in 14,064 households. The following census in 2011 counted 58,208 people in 16,687 households. The 2016 census measured the population of the district as 54,184 inhabitants in 16,605 households.

=== Administrative divisions ===
Central District (Sahneh County) Population
Administrative Divisions	2006	2011	2016
Gamasiyab RD	6,365	6,330	5,228
Hojr RD	7,007	7,211	6,768
Khodabandehlu RD	3,389	2,939	2,177
Sahneh RD	4,960	5,186	4,503
Sahneh (city)	34,133	36,542	35,508
Total	55,854	58,208	54,184
RD = Rural District
