= Gandab =

Gandab or Gand Ab (Persian: گنداب) may refer to the following locations in Iran:

- Gandab, Chaharmahal and Bakhtiari
- Gandab, Golestan
- Gandab, Ilam
- Gandab, Kerman
- Gandab, Kermanshah
- Gandab, Javanrud, Kermanshah Province
- Gandab-e Olya, Kermanshah
- Gandab-e Sofla, Kermanshah
- Gandab, Kurdistan
- Gandab-e Olya, Kurdistan
- Gandab-e Sofla, Kurdistan
- Gand Ab, Borujerd, Lorestan Province
- Gandab, Dorud, Lorestan Province
- Gandab, Markazi
- Gandab, Mazandaran
- Gandab, Razavi Khorasan
- Gandab, Fariman, Razavi Khorasan Province
- Gandab, Semnan
- Gandab, Zanjan
