= Kalkan, Iran =

Kalkan or Kalakan (Persian: كلكان) in Iran may refer to:

- Kalkan, Divandarreh, Kurdistan Province
- Kalkan, Sanandaj, Kurdistan Province
- Kalkan-e Aftabru, Kermanshah Province
- Kalkan-e Nesar, Kermanshah Province
