= Posht Kelan =

Posht Kelan پشت كلان
- Village
- Location within Iran
- Coordinates: 34°44′44″N 47°13′45″E
- Country: Iran
- Province: Kermanshah
- County: Sahneh
- Bakhsh: Dinavar
- Rural District: Horr

Population (2006)
  - Total: 107
- Time zone: UTC+3:30 (IRST)
  - Summer (DST): UTC+4:30 (IRDT)

Posht Kelan (Persian: پشت كلان, also Romanized as Posht Kelān; also known as Bāsh Gelān and Peshtgelān) is a village in Horr Rural District, Dinavar District, Sahneh County, Kermanshah Province, Iran. At the 2006 census, its population was 107, in 24 families.
