= Abd ol Mohammad =

Abd ol Mohammad عبدل محمد
- Village
- Location within Iran
- Coordinates: 34°40′12″N 47°20′09″E
- Country: Iran
- Province: Kermanshah
- County: Sahneh
- Bakhsh: Dinavar
- Rural District: Horr

Population (2006)
  - Total: 167
- Time zone: UTC+3:30 (IRST)
  - Summer (DST): UTC+4:30 (IRDT)

Abd ol Mohammad (Persian: عبدل محمد, also Romanized as ‘Abd ol Moḩammad) is a village in Horr Rural District, Dinavar District, Sahneh County, Kermanshah Province, Iran. At the 2006 census, its population was 167, in 43 families.
