= Melehaneh =

Melehaneh ملحانه
- Village
- Location within Iran
- Coordinates: 34°37′25″N 47°12′49″E
- Country: Iran
- Province: Kermanshah
- County: Sahneh
- Bakhsh: Dinavar
- Rural District: Kanduleh

Population (2006)
  - Total: 59
- Time zone: UTC+3:30 (IRST)
  - Summer (DST): UTC+4:30 (IRDT)

Melehaneh (Persian: ملحانه, also Romanized as Meleḩāneh; also known as Malāneh, Melleh Hāneh, Molāḩāneh, Moleh Hāneh, and Molkhāneh) is a village in Kanduleh Rural District, Dinavar District, Sahneh County, Kermanshah Province, Iran. At the 2006 census, its population was 59, in 14 families.
