= Boz Rud =

Boz Rud (Persian: بز رود), also rendered as Buzrud, may refer to:

- Eslamabad-e Bezahrud
- Qaleh-ye Bozeh Rud
