= Qaleh-ye Deh Khanjan =

Qaleh-ye Deh Khanjan قلعه دهخانجان
- Village
- Location within Iran
- Coordinates: 34°36′25″N 47°24′50″E
- Country: Iran
- Province: Kermanshah
- County: Sahneh
- Bakhsh: Dinavar
- Rural District: Dinavar

Population (2006)
  - Total: 85
- Time zone: UTC+3:30 (IRST)
  - Summer (DST): UTC+4:30 (IRDT)

Qaleh-ye Deh Khanjan (Persian: قلعه دهخانجان, also Romanized as Qal‘eh-ye Deh Khānjān) is a village in Dinavar Rural District, Dinavar District, Sahneh County, Kermanshah Province, Iran. At the 2006 census, its population was 85, in 22 families.
