= Ziba Jub =

Ziba Jub زيباجوب
- Village
- Location within Iran
- Coordinates: 34°36′49″N 47°27′12″E
- Country: Iran
- Province: Kermanshah
- County: Sahneh
- Bakhsh: Dinavar
- Rural District: Dinavar

Population (2006)
  - Total: 318
- Time zone: UTC+3:30 (IRST)
  - Summer (DST): UTC+4:30 (IRDT)

Ziba Jub (Persian: زيباجوب, also Romanized as Zībā Jūb) is a village in Dinavar Rural District, Dinavar District, Sahneh County, Kermanshah Province, Iran. At the 2006 census, its population was 318, in 87 families.
