= Shah Veysabad =

Shah Veysabad شاه ويس اباد
- Village
- Location within Iran
- Coordinates: 34°38′51″N 47°23′40″E
- Country: Iran
- Province: Kermanshah
- County: Sahneh
- Bakhsh: Dinavar
- Rural District: Horr

Population (2006)
  - Total: 181
- Time zone: UTC+3:30 (IRST)
  - Summer (DST): UTC+4:30 (IRDT)

Shah Veysabad (Persian: شاه ويس اباد, also Romanized as Shāh Veysābād) is a village in Horr Rural District, Dinavar District, Sahneh County, Kermanshah Province, Iran. At the 2006 census, its population was 181, in 44 families.
