= Kanduleh =

Kanduleh (Persian: كندوله) may refer to:

- Kanduleh, Sahneh
- Kanduleh Rural District, in Sahneh County
