= Gandab-e Olya =

Gandab-e Olya or Gandab Olya (Persian: گنداب عليا) may refer to:

- Gandab-e Olya, Kermanshah
- Gandab-e Olya, Kurdistan
