= Korizagheh =

Korizagheh كري زاغه
- Village
- Location within Iran
- Coordinates: 34°33′22″N 47°13′20″E
- Country: Iran
- Province: Kermanshah
- County: Sahneh
- Bakhsh: Dinavar
- Rural District: Kanduleh

Population (2006)
  - Total: 289
- Time zone: UTC+3:30 (IRST)
  - Summer (DST): UTC+4:30 (IRDT)

Korizagheh (Persian: كري زاغه, also Romanized as Korīzāgheh; also known as Kor Zāgheh, Kūh-e Zakheh, Kūh-i-Zākha, and Kūh Zākheh) is a village in Kanduleh Rural District, Dinavar District, Sahneh County, Kermanshah Province, Iran. At the 2006 census, its population was 289, in 53 families.
