= Jamishan =

Jamishan (Persian: جاميشان) may refer to:

- Jamishan-e Olya (disambiguation)
- Jamishan-e Sofla
