= Kandab =

Kandab (Persian: كنداب) may refer to:

- Kandab Bala
- Kandab Pain
