= Cheshmeh-ye Alucheh =

Cheshmeh-ye Alucheh چشمه الوچه
- Village
- Country: Iran
- Province: Kermanshah
- County: Sahneh
- Bakhsh: Dinavar
- Rural District: Kanduleh

Population (2006)
  - Total: 252
- Time zone: UTC+3:30 (IRST)
  - Summer (DST): UTC+4:30 (IRDT)

Cheshmeh-ye Alucheh (Persian: چشمه الوچه, also Romanized as Cheshmeh-ye Alūcheh) is a village in Kanduleh Rural District, Dinavar District, Sahneh County, Kermanshah Province, Iran. At the 2006 census, its population was 252, in 66 families.
