= Tinemu =

Tinemu or Tinamu (Persian: تينمو) may refer to:

- Tinemu-ye Olya
- Tinemu-ye Sofla
