= Balesht =

Balesht بلشت
- Village
- Location within Iran
- Coordinates: 34°44′27″N 47°15′04″E
- Country: Iran
- Province: Kermanshah
- County: Sahneh
- Bakhsh: Dinavar
- Rural District: Horr

Population (2006)
  - Total: 274
- Time zone: UTC+3:30 (IRST)
  - Summer (DST): UTC+4:30 (IRDT)

Balesht (Persian: بلشت, also Romanized as Baleshat; also known as Bālisht and Palesht) is a village in Horr Rural District, Dinavar District, Sahneh County, Kermanshah Province, Iran. At the 2006 census, its population was 274, in 69 families.
