= Gandab-e Sofla =

Gandab-e Sofla or Gandab Sofla (Persian: گنداب سفلي) may refer to:

- Gandab-e Sofla, Kermanshah
- Gandab-e Sofla, Kurdistan
