= Cheshmeh-ye Biglar =

Cheshmeh-ye Biglar چشمه بيگلر
- Village
- Location within Iran
- Coordinates: 34°38′21″N 47°19′45″E
- Country: Iran
- Province: Kermanshah
- County: Sahneh
- Bakhsh: Dinavar
- Rural District: Kanduleh

Population (2006)
  - Total: 43
- Time zone: UTC+3:30 (IRST)
  - Summer (DST): UTC+4:30 (IRDT)

Cheshmeh-ye Biglar (Persian: چشمه بيگلر, also Romanized as Cheshmeh-ye Bīglar; also known as Cheshmeh Beglar) is a village in Kanduleh Rural District, Dinavar District, Sahneh County, Kermanshah Province, Iran. At the 2006 census, its population was 43, in 9 families.
