= Pir Qasem =

Pir Qasem پيرقاسم
- Village
- Location within Iran
- Coordinates: 34°34′46″N 47°24′51″E
- Country: Iran
- Province: Kermanshah
- County: Sahneh
- Bakhsh: Dinavar
- Rural District: Dinavar

Population (2006)
  - Total: 24
- Time zone: UTC+3:30 (IRST)
  - Summer (DST): UTC+4:30 (IRDT)

Pir Qasem (Persian: پيرقاسم, also Romanized as Pīr Qāsem) is a village in Dinavar Rural District, Dinavar District, Sahneh County, Kermanshah Province, Iran. At the 2006 census, its population was 24, in 6 families.
