= Qarujenag =

Qarujenag قروجنگ
- Village
- Location within Iran
- Coordinates: 34°36′13″N 47°11′07″E
- Country: Iran
- Province: Kermanshah
- County: Sahneh
- Bakhsh: Dinavar
- Rural District: Kanduleh

Population (2006)
  - Total: 39
- Time zone: UTC+3:30 (IRST)
  - Summer (DST): UTC+4:30 (IRDT)

Qarujenag (Persian: قروجنگ, also Romanized as Qarūjenag; also known as Qūrūchnak and Qūrūch Nak-e ‘Olyā) is a village in Kanduleh Rural District, Dinavar District, Sahneh County, Kermanshah Province, Iran. At the 2006 census, its population was 39, in 10 families.
