= Khalilollah =

Khalilollah خليل اله
- Village
- Location within Iran
- Coordinates: 34°35′21″N 47°13′36″E
- Country: Iran
- Province: Kermanshah
- County: Sahneh
- Bakhsh: Dinavar
- Rural District: Kanduleh

Population (2006)
  - Total: 31
- Time zone: UTC+3:30 (IRST)
  - Summer (DST): UTC+4:30 (IRDT)

Khalilollah (Persian: خليل اله, also Romanized as Khalīlollāh) is a village in Kanduleh Rural District, Dinavar District, Sahneh County, Kermanshah Province, Iran. At the 2006 census, its population was 31, in 5 families.
