= Tarazu Bareh =

Tarazu Bareh ترازوبره
- Village
- Location within Iran
- Coordinates: 34°37′46″N 47°13′41″E
- Country: Iran
- Province: Kermanshah
- County: Sahneh
- Bakhsh: Dinavar
- Rural District: Kanduleh

Population (2006)
  - Total: 158
- Time zone: UTC+3:30 (IRST)
  - Summer (DST): UTC+4:30 (IRDT)

Tarazu Bareh (Persian: ترازوبره, also Romanized as Tarāzū Bareh and Tarāzū Barreh) is a village in Kanduleh Rural District, Dinavar District, Sahneh County, Kermanshah Province, Iran. At the 2006 census, its population was 158, in 47 families.
