= Kortavij =

Kortavij or Kort Vij (Persian: كرتويج), also rendered as Gortavich, may refer to:

- Kortavij-e Olya
- Kortavij-e Sofla
