= Jabbarabad =

Jabbarabad جباراباد
- Village
- Location within Iran
- Coordinates: 34°38′41″N 47°30′13″E
- Country: Iran
- Province: Kermanshah
- County: Sahneh
- Bakhsh: Dinavar
- Rural District: Dinavar

Population (2006)
  - Total: 115
- Time zone: UTC+3:30 (IRST)
  - Summer (DST): UTC+4:30 (IRDT)

Jabbarabad (Persian: جباراباد, also Romanized as Jabbārābād) is a village in Dinavar Rural District, Dinavar District, Sahneh County, Kermanshah Province, Iran. At the 2006 census, its population was 115, in 31 families.
