= Melah Bid =

Melah Bid مله بيد
- Village
- Location within Iran
- Coordinates: 34°45′18″N 47°12′13″E
- Country: Iran
- Province: Kermanshah
- County: Sahneh
- Bakhsh: Dinavar
- Rural District: Horr

Population (2006)
  - Total: 104
- Time zone: UTC+3:30 (IRST)
  - Summer (DST): UTC+4:30 (IRDT)

Melah Bid (Persian: مله بيد, also Romanized as Melah Bīd and Melahbīd) is a village in Horr Rural District, Dinavar District, Sahneh County, Kermanshah Province, Iran. At the 2006 census, its population was 104, in 30 families.
