= Kalkan-e Nesar =

Kalkan-e Nesar كلكان نسار
- Village
- Location within Iran
- Coordinates: 34°43′30″N 47°17′19″E
- Country: Iran
- Province: Kermanshah
- County: Sahneh
- Bakhsh: Dinavar
- Rural District: Horr

Population (2006)
  - Total: 97
- Time zone: UTC+3:30 (IRST)
  - Summer (DST): UTC+4:30 (IRDT)

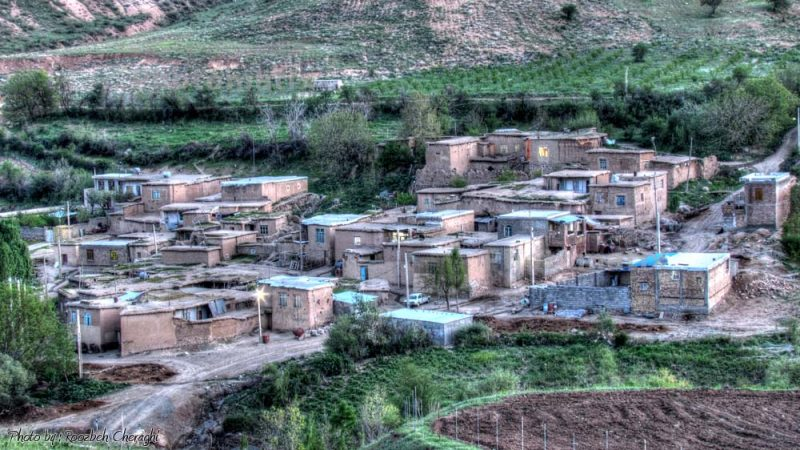

Kalkan-e Nesar (Persian: كلكان نسار, also Romanized as Kalkān-e Nesār) is a village in Horr Rural District, Dinavar District, Sahneh County, Kermanshah Province, Iran. According to the 2006 census, its population was 97, divided in 26 families.
