= Jamishan-e Olya, Sahneh =

Jamishan-e Olya جاميشان عليا
- Village
- Location within Iran
- Coordinates: 34°39′48″N 47°26′01″E
- Country: Iran
- Province: Kermanshah
- County: Sahneh
- Bakhsh: Dinavar
- Rural District: Horr

Population (2006)
  - Total: 124
- Time zone: UTC+3:30 (IRST)
  - Summer (DST): UTC+4:30 (IRDT)

Jamishan-e Olya (Persian: جاميشان عليا, also Romanized as Jāmīshān-e ‘Olyā; also known as Jāmīshān-e Vosţá) is a village in Horr Rural District, Dinavar District, Sahneh County, Kermanshah Province, Iran. At the 2006 census, its population was 124, in 32 families.
