= Muineh =

Village in Kermanshah province, Iran

Muineh Persian: موئينه
- Village
- Location within Iran
- Coordinates: 34°42′01″N 47°21′03″E
- Country: Iran
- Province: Kermanshah
- County: Sahneh
- District: Dinavar
- Rural District: Horr

Population (2016)
  - Total: 324
- Time zone: UTC+3:30 (IRST)

Muineh (Persian: موئينه) (Note: Also romanized as Mū‘īneh) is a village in, and the capital of, Horr Rural District of Dinavar District, Sahneh County, Kermanshah province, Iran.

== Demographics ==
=== Population ===
At the time of the 2006 National Census, the village's population was 362 in 101 households. The following census in 2011 counted 471 people in 113 households. The 2016 census measured the population of the village as 324 people in 95 households.
