= Qaleh-ye Bozeh Rud =

Qaleh-ye Bozeh Rud قلعه بزه رود
- Village
- Location within Iran
- Coordinates: 34°37′52″N 47°15′18″E
- Country: Iran
- Province: Kermanshah
- County: Sahneh
- Bakhsh: Dinavar
- Rural District: Kanduleh

Population (2006)
  - Total: 221
- Time zone: UTC+3:30 (IRST)
  - Summer (DST): UTC+4:30 (IRDT)

Qaleh-ye Bozeh Rud (Persian: قلعه بزه رود, also Romanized as Qal‘eh-ye Bozeh Rūd; also known as Boz Rūd, Buzrūd, Kulāh, Qal‘eh Barzūd, and Qal‘eh Bezarūd) is a village in Kanduleh Rural District, Dinavar District, Sahneh County, Kermanshah Province, Iran. At the 2006 census, its population was 221, in 75 families.
