= Eslamabad-e Bezahrud =

Eslamabad-e Bezahrud اسلام اباد بزه رود
- Village
- Location within Iran
- Coordinates: 34°38′52″N 47°14′41″E
- Country: Iran
- Province: Kermanshah
- County: Sahneh
- Bakhsh: Dinavar
- Rural District: Kanduleh

Population (2006)
  - Total: 92
- Time zone: UTC+3:30 (IRST)
  - Summer (DST): UTC+4:30 (IRDT)

Eslamabad-e Bezahrud (Persian: اسلام اباد بزه رود, also Romanized as Eslāmābād-e Bezahrūd; also known as Bazrūd, Bezarūd, Bozeh Rūd, Boz Rūd, and Buzrud) is a village in Kanduleh Rural District, Dinavar District, Sahneh County, Kermanshah Province, Iran. At the 2006 census, its population was 92, in 24 families.
