= Kortavij-e Sofla =

Kortavij-e Sofla كرتويج سفلي
- Village
- Location within Iran
- Coordinates: 34°37′01″N 47°18′20″E
- Country: Iran
- Province: Kermanshah
- County: Sahneh
- Bakhsh: Dinavar
- Rural District: Kanduleh

Population (2006)
  - Total: 182
- Time zone: UTC+3:30 (IRST)
  - Summer (DST): UTC+4:30 (IRDT)

Kortavij-e Sofla (Persian: كرتويج سفلي, also Romanized as Kortavīj-e Soflá; also known as Gortavīch-e Soflá) is a village in Kanduleh Rural District, Dinavar District, Sahneh County, Kermanshah Province, Iran. At the 2006 census, its population was 182, in 44 families.
