= Puyan, Kermanshah =

Puyan پويان
- Village
- Location within Iran
- Coordinates: 34°42′08″N 47°17′38″E
- Country: Iran
- Province: Kermanshah
- County: Sahneh
- Bakhsh: Dinavar
- Rural District: Horr

Population (2006)
  - Total: 138
- Time zone: UTC+3:30 (IRST)
  - Summer (DST): UTC+4:30 (IRDT)

Puyan (Persian: پويان, also Romanized as Pūyān) is a village in Horr Rural District, Dinavar District, Sahneh County, Kermanshah Province, Iran. At the 2006 census, its population was 138, in 31 families.
