= Sar Takht, Kermanshah =

Village in Kermanshah province, Iran

Sar Takht Persian: سرتخت
- Village
- Location within Iran
- Coordinates: 34°46′51″N 47°09′56″E
- Country: Iran
- Province: Kermanshah
- County: Sahneh
- District: Dinavar
- Rural District: Horr

Population (2016)
  - Total: 434
- Time zone: UTC+3:30 (IRST)

Sar Takht (Persian: سرتخت) is a village in Horr Rural District of Dinavar District, Sahneh County, Kermanshah province, Iran.

== Demographics ==
=== Population ===
At the time of the 2006 National Census, the village's population was 531 in 122 households. The following census in 2011 counted 361 people in 102 households. The 2016 census measured the population of the village as 434 people in 135 households. It was the most populous village in its rural district.
