= Tinemu-ye Sofla =

Tinemu-ye Sofla تينموسفلي
- Village
- Location within Iran
- Coordinates: 34°39′19″N 47°33′01″E
- Country: Iran
- Province: Kermanshah
- County: Sahneh
- Bakhsh: Dinavar
- Rural District: Dinavar

Population (2006)
  - Total: 165
- Time zone: UTC+3:30 (IRST)
  - Summer (DST): UTC+4:30 (IRDT)

Tinemu-ye Sofla (Persian: تينموسفلي, also Romanized as Tīnemū-ye Soflá, Tīnamu Soflá, Tīnamū-ye Soflá, Tīnemū-e Soflá; also known as Tīnemū-ye Pā’īn) is a village in Dinavar Rural District, Dinavar District, Sahneh County, Kermanshah Province, Iran. At the 2006 census, its population was 165, in 39 families.
