= Tinemu-ye Olya =

Tinemu-ye Olya تينموعليا
- Village
- Location within Iran
- Coordinates: 34°39′28″N 47°32′46″E
- Country: Iran
- Province: Kermanshah
- County: Sahneh
- Bakhsh: Dinavar
- Rural District: Dinavar

Population (2006)
  - Total: 130
- Time zone: UTC+3:30 (IRST)
  - Summer (DST): UTC+4:30 (IRDT)

Tinemu-ye Olya (Persian: تينموعليا, also Romanized as Tīnemū-ye ‘Olyā, Tīnemū-e ‘Olyā, Tīnamū ‘Olyā, and Tīnamū-ye ‘Olyā; also known as Tappeh Mey and Tīnamū) is a village in Dinavar Rural District, Dinavar District, Sahneh County, Kermanshah Province, Iran. At the 2006 census, its population was 130, in 33 families.
