= Jamishan-e Olya =

Jamishan-e Olya (Persian: جاميشان عليا) may refer to:

- Jamishan-e Olya, Sahneh
- Jamishan-e Olya, Sonqor
