= Shir Khan, Kermanshah =

Shir Khan شيرخان
- Village
- Location within Iran
- Coordinates: 34°37′11″N 47°28′03″E
- Country: Iran
- Province: Kermanshah
- County: Sahneh
- Bakhsh: Dinavar
- Rural District: Dinavar

Population (2006)
  - Total: 156
- Time zone: UTC+3:30 (IRST)
  - Summer (DST): UTC+4:30 (IRDT)

Shir Khan (Persian: شيرخان, also Romanized as Shīr Khān) is a village in Dinavar Rural District, Dinavar District, Sahneh County, Kermanshah Province, Iran. At the 2006 census, its population was 156, in 42 families.
