= Puyan =

Puyan may refer to the following places:

== Iran ==
- Puyan, Kermanshah (پويان Pūyān), a village in Horr Rural District, Dinavar District, Sahneh County, Kermanshah Province

== Taiwan ==
- Puyan, Changhua (埔鹽鄉), township in Changhua County
