= Kalkan-e Aftabru =

Kalkan-e Aftabru كلكان افتابرو
- Village
- Location within Iran
- Coordinates: 34°43′30″N 47°18′05″E
- Country: Iran
- Province: Kermanshah
- County: Sahneh
- Bakhsh: Dinavar
- Rural District: Horr

Population (2006)
  - Total: 91
- Time zone: UTC+3:30 (IRST)
  - Summer (DST): UTC+4:30 (IRDT)

Kalkan-e Aftabru (Persian: كلكان افتابرو, also Romanized as Kalkān-e Āftābrū and Kalkān-e Āftāb Row) is a village in Horr Rural District, Dinavar District, Sahneh County, Kermanshah Province, Iran. At the 2006 census, its population was 91, in 23 families.
