= Sadval =

Sadval could refer to:

- Sadval (movement), an Azerbaijani political movement
- Sadval, Iran, a village
