= Sadval, Iran =

Sadval سادول
- Village
- Location within Iran
- Coordinates: 34°43′44″N 47°15′53″E
- Country: Iran
- Province: Kermanshah
- County: Sahneh
- Bakhsh: Dinavar
- Rural District: Horr

Population (2006)
  - Total: 138
- Time zone: UTC+3:30 (IRST)
  - Summer (DST): UTC+4:30 (IRDT)

Sadval (Persian: سادول, also Romanized as Sādval) is a village in Horr Rural District, Dinavar District, Sahneh County, Kermanshah Province, Iran. At the 2006 census, its population was 138, in 35 families.
