= Jeyhunabad, Kermanshah =

Village in Kermanshah province, Iran

Jeyhunabad Persian: جۊناوا
- Village
- Location within Iran
- Coordinates: 34°34′14″N 47°30′55″E
- Country: Iran
- Province: Kermanshah
- County: Sahneh
- District: Dinavar
- Rural District: Dinavar

Population (2016)
  - Total: 872
- Time zone: UTC+3:30 (IRST)

Jeyhunabad (Persian: جيحون آباد) (Note: Also romanized as Jeyḩūnābād; also known as Ceyhûnabad and Jehūnābād; and Cünawa (Kurdish: جۊناوا)) is a village in Dinavar Rural District of Dinavar District, Sahneh County, Kermanshah province, Iran.

== Demographics ==
=== Population ===
At the time of the 2006 National Census, the village's population was 1,076 in 297 households. The following census in 2011 counted 1,028 people in 329 households. The 2016 census measured the population of the village as 872 people in 301 households. It was the most populous village in its rural district.

Famous mystics from Jeyhunabad include Malek Jân Ne’mati, Nur Ali Elahi, and Hajj Nematollah.
