= Kortavij-e Olya =

Kortavij-e Olya كرتويج عليا
- Village
- Location within Iran
- Coordinates: 34°36′07″N 47°15′57″E
- Country: Iran
- Province: Kermanshah
- County: Sahneh
- Bakhsh: Dinavar
- Rural District: Kanduleh

Population (2006)
  - Total: 295
- Time zone: UTC+3:30 (IRST)
  - Summer (DST): UTC+4:30 (IRDT)

Kortavij-e Olya (Persian: كرتويج عليا, also romanized as Kortavīj-e ‘Olyā and Kort Vīj-e ‘Olyā; also known as Gortavīch-e ‘Olyā, Kortavīj-e Bālā, Kurtai, and Kurtai Bālā) is a village in Kanduleh Rural District, Dinavar District, Sahneh County, Kermanshah Province, Iran. At the 2006 census, its population was 295, in 72 families.
