= Kalkan (disambiguation) =

Kalkan may refer to:

- Kalkan, town on the Turkish Mediterranean coast
- Kalkan, Eğil
- Kalkan, Iran (disambiguation), places in Iran
- Hüseyin Kalkan, mayor of Batman in Southeast Anatolia, Turkey
- Murat Kalkan, Turkish footballer
- Nezihe Kalkan, Turkish dancer and singer
- Kalkan (fish), one of the vernacular name of the Black-Sea Turbot, Scophthalmus maeoticus
- Kal Kan, a brand of pet food now known as Whiskas

== See also ==
- Kalakan (disambiguation)
