= Jamishan-e Sofla =

Jamishan-e Sofla جاميشان سفلي
- Village
- Location within Iran
- Coordinates: 34°38′46″N 47°26′01″E
- Country: Iran
- Province: Kermanshah
- County: Sahneh
- Bakhsh: Dinavar
- Rural District: Horr

Population (2006)
  - Total: 150
- Time zone: UTC+3:30 (IRST)
  - Summer (DST): UTC+4:30 (IRDT)

Jamishan-e Sofla (Persian: جاميشان سفلي, also Romanized as Jāmīshān-e Soflá) is a village in Horr Rural District, Dinavar District, Sahneh County, Kermanshah Province, Iran. At the 2006 census, its population was 150, in 40 families.
