= Malak Jân Nemati =

Kurdish-Iranian mystical writer (1906–1993)

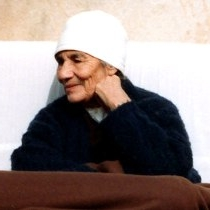
- Born: 11 December 1906; Jeyhounabad (Kermanshah province), Qajar Iran
- Died: 15 July 1993 (aged 86); Paris, France
- Other names: Sheikh Jâni, Saint Jani
- Occupations: Author, poet

Malak Jân Nemati or Malek Jân Nemati (Persian: ملک‌جان نعمتی; 11 December 1906 – 15 July 1993), also known as Sheikh Jâni and Saint Jani, was a Kurdish-Iranian mystical writer and poet in both Kurdish and Persian.

She was the daughter of Hajj Nematollah and the sister of Ostad Elahi. There are few written sources about her life. Some elements can be found in the words of her brother Ostad Elahi whom she was very close to. A biography in French was published on the occasion of the centennial of her birth, including the translation of some of her poems and sayings.

== Biography ==
Malak Jan was born into a family belonging to the mystical order the Ahl-e Haqq (literally “People of the Truth”). Her father Hajj Nematollah was an outstanding spiritual personality who gave up a comfortable life a few years before she was born to devote himself to finding the Truth. So from a very early age, Malak Jan was initiated with the rest of her family to asceticism and prayer, but also and above all to ethical and spiritual reflection.

While in those days and in those remote regions of Kurdistan, new-born girls were greeted with condolences, it is noteworthy that Malak Jan received the same comprehensive education as her elder brother. With Kurdish as her mother tongue, she learned Persian and Arabic and set about studying the revealed books and the extremely rich Iranian poetry from which she would later draw her inspiration when writing her own poems. She was also given a musical education as she learned to play the tanbur (Kurdish lute accompanying Ahl-e Haqq sacred chants) and the setar (classical Persian lute). Hajj Nematollah was particularly fond of her. In keeping with his wish, she wore a white habit and bonnet “so that people could not tell whether it was a boy or a girl”. She actually wore that outfit throughout her life.

When she was thirteen, she had to suffer the grief of losing her father. Shortly afterwards, she experienced a painful ocular condition and by the age of twenty, she was completely and permanently blinded. The loss of her eyesight, though, seems to have coincided with the awakening of a form of mystical passion that led her to progressively draw closer to her brother Ostad Elahi and she became one of his most accomplished followers. When Ostad Elahi died in 1974, she quite naturally took up the torch of his spiritual teaching.

Progressively, Malak Jan's personality, her meaningful spiritual reflection and constant practice of charity earned her a reputation for saintliness in her deeply religious milieu. People around her wrote down what she said and the advice she gave, and a certain number of their notes have been translated into French.

Despite her handicap, Malak Jan spent her whole life studying anatomy, science, history, geography, using, for instance, audiotaped courses. This passion for knowledge amounted to a spiritual as well as an intellectual approach. Malak Jan was opposed to what she called “superstitious spirit” and attempted to tackle spirituality with reflection and knowledge. She refused to blindly accept principles turned into dogmas: "In the beginning, I would say to myself: 'I have to understand by myself'. I would not believe what other people said. For instance, I had to understand by myself that there is a world beyond, that there is a God, that there are spiritual laws, that the soul is eternal… I first resolved the question of the existence of God, then I understood that there is an Account and that no being will be wronged…"

Malak Jan first endeavored to progressively develop this way of dealing with spirituality among the peasants of Jeyhounabad, known in the country since then as "the village of philosophers". In the same spirit, she contributed to improving to living conditions of the villagers by having electricity brought or by inventing an interest-free microcredit system. Although living in a deeply patriarchal society, she used her spiritual authority to defend more specifically women's rights, by gradually teaching mothers to look after their daughters as much as their sons, by getting fathers to leave them a share of inheritance equal to that of their brothers. Towards the end of her life, Malak Jan brought a certain number of reforms to the Ahl-e Haqq form of worship that contributed to attributing women the same level of dignity as men on the ritual plane. To Ahl-e Haqq devotees these reforms amounted to a doctrinal revolution and the most traditionalist branches of the order expressed their hostility.

Malak Jan Nemati died in 1993 in France after having an open-heart surgery. She was buried in the Perche region of France, in a small village called Baillou. A stone and glass shrine has been erected on her grave in her memory: the Saint Jani Memorial.

== Bibliography ==
=== French ===
Leili Anvar, Malek Jân Ne'mati. La vie n'est pas courte mais le temps est compté, Diane de Selliers, Paris (2007).

"Ma Main à sa main amarrée: figures de l'Aimé dans la poésie de Malek Jân Ne'mati" in : Poésie des Suds et des Orients, L'Harmattan (2008).

"Malek Jân Ne'mati. La mystique éclairée" in : Le Monde des Religions, n°39, January–February 2010.

=== Persian ===
Nur Ali Elahi, Asar-ol Haqq (Words of Truth), Volume 1, Tehran, 3rd edition (1987) and Volume 2, Tehran (1991).
