= Gandab-e Olya, Kermanshah =

Gandab-e Olya گنداب عليا
- Village
- Location within Iran
- Coordinates: 34°41′46″N 47°24′23″E
- Country: Iran
- Province: Kermanshah
- County: Sahneh
- Bakhsh: Dinavar
- Rural District: Horr

Population (2006)
  - Total: 162
- Time zone: UTC+3:30 (IRST)
  - Summer (DST): UTC+4:30 (IRDT)

Gandab-e Olya (Persian: گنداب عليا, also Romanized as Gandāb-e ‘Olyā) is a village in Horr Rural District, Dinavar District, Sahneh County, Kermanshah Province, Iran. At the 2006 census, its population was 162, in 37 families.
