= Fakhr-un-Nisa =

11th and 12th-century Islamic scholar and calligrapher

Fakhr-un-Nisa Shuhdah Umm Muhammad al-Baghdadiyyah
- Title: Shaykhah

Personal life
- Born: Fakhr-un-Nisa Dinawar
- Died: 1112 Baghdad
- Region: Iraq
- Main interest(s): Hadith, Calligraphy
- Occupation: Islamic scholar, Calligrapher

Religious life
- Religion: Islam
- Denomination: Sunni
- Jurisprudence: Shafi'i
- Creed: Ash'ari

Fakhr-un-Nisa Shuhdah Umm Muhammad al-Baghdadiyyah or Shuhdah al-Baghdadiyyah (died 1112) was a scholar, muhaddith and a calligrapher. Shuhdha was called "the calligrapher, the pride of womanhood, a muhaddithah (female of muhaddith) of Iraq with a high Isnad."

== Name ==
Her full name stands Fakhr-un-Nisa Shuhdah Umm Muhammad bint Abu Nasr. Fakhr-un-Nisa, in Arabic, means the "Glory of Womanhood." She was titled Shuhdah al-Baghdadiyyah, or the "Writer of Baghdad" and al Katibah, or “the female scriber”.

== Early life and education ==
Fakhr-un-Nisa Shuhdah was born in early 11th century in the Iranian city of Dinawar to Abu Nasr Ahmad ibn al-Faraj al-Dinawari (d.574). Her great-grandfather had been a dealer in needles, and thus acquired the soubriquet al-Ibri'. But it was her father who had acquired a passion for hadith, and managed to study it with several masters of the subject. Abiding the Sunnah, he himself gave his daughter a sound academic education, ensuring that she studied under many traditionists of accepted reputation.

Fakhr-un-Nisa then studied hadith with the famous teachers of Baghdad: Triad ibn Muhammad al-Zaynabi, Ibn Talhah al-Ni’ali, Anu I’Hasan ibn Ayyub, Abu I-Khattab ibn Batir, Ahmad ibn ‘Abd al-Qadir ibn Yusuf, and others. She also received Hadith lessons and studied other branches of knowledge under the guidance of reputed scholars like Abu ‘Abdullah Hasan ibn Ahmad Nomani, Abu Bakr Muhammad ibn Ahmad-As-Shashi, and Abu-Al-Husayni’.

At that time, women would begin their studies with knowledgeable people within the household. Then they would continue with local teachers outside of the family circle. If they aspired to pursue further education, they would go to the teachers in other towns and cities.

== Scholarship and contributions ==
=== Hadith literature ===
Al-Muwatta: Imam Malik's best-known work, Al-Muwatta was the first written collection of hadith comprising the subjects of Muslim law, compiled and edited by the Imam, Malik ibn Anas. Al-Muwatta consists of approximately 1,720 hadiths. Shuhdah al Baghdadiyyah studied them all.

Al-Mashyakhat: This is an arrangement of hadith by the shaykhs or teachers of those hadith. Shuhdah l-Baghdadiyyah studied the Mashayakhah of ibn Sahdhan with Abu Ghalib Muhammad ibn al-Hasan al-Baqillani.

Al-Ajza: Al-Ajza is the plural of juz and means component section of something. Here it is referring to the hadiths of just one person or hadiths collected on just one topic. During the fourth century A.H. onward, women showed great interest in studying them. Shuhdah studied the most famous, Juz ibn Arafah, with its highest narrator Ibn Bayan; Juz Ibn hanbal, with Abu I-Hasan ibn al-Tuyuri; and Juz Hilal al-Haffar with Tirad.

Al-Musalsalat: the term musalsal refers to a hadith around the narration of which there is some particular association that the tradition has deemed worthy of preserving along with the hadith itself. She studied al-Musafahah of al-Barqani.

Shuhdah narrated the Mu’jam of al-Isma’ili and the Mashyakhah of Ibn Shadhan. Her student Abl al Aziz ibn Mahmud ibn al-Mubarak ibn al-Akhdar compiled the Mashayakhah Shuhdah in her lifetime. It has 114 narrations and most of them are prophetic hadiths drawn from 27 of her shaykhs. Shuhdah commanded a great name in the studies of Hadith.

The seekers of learning came from distant places and took it as a mark of pride if they were allowed to join her session of learning. Many scholars of renown were said to be a regular audience of her tautology and would acquire authority from her to report the hadith on behalf of her. She not only exhibited her erudition in Hadith study, but also would deliver scholarly speeches on history, linguistics and literature.

=== Calligraphy ===
She was generally considered talented at calligraphy. She came to acquire the title of Fakhr-un-Nisa (Pride of the Women) for her erudition, calligraphic art, and oratory.

== Later life and death ==
Fakhr-un-Nisa Shuhdha's husband died after forty years of marriage. She endured the great shock with courage and patience and occupied herself with learning and educating. The caliph Al-Muqtadi Bi-amr-Allah granted her a large estate to enhance the scope of her scholarly activities. She, with the help of donations, established a grand institution (Darsgah) on the banks of the river Tigris, where hundreds of students pursued their studies and all expenses were taken care of by FakhrShuhdah herself.

She died in 1112 at the age of more than 90. Her funeral prayer was offered at Jama’e Al-Qasr in Baghdad. Thousands of people, including scholars, students, and state dignitaries are said to have participated in her funeral proceedings.

== Legacy ==
Abu'l-Faraj ibn al-Jawzi praised her for her piety, works of calligraphy and charity. Al-Safadi notes her extensive knowledge of hadith and her piety, taqwa and benevolence.
