= Hajj Nematollah =

Iranian mystic and religious leader (1871–1919)

- Born: 1871; Jeyhounabad, Kermanshah province, Qajar Iran
- Died: 28 February 1920 (aged 48); Jeyhounabad, Kermanshah province, Qajar Iran
- Occupation: Author
- Spouse: Sakina Khanoom
- Children: Nur Ali Elahi, Yar Ali, Bahram, Malek Jan Nemati, Javaher, and Mariam

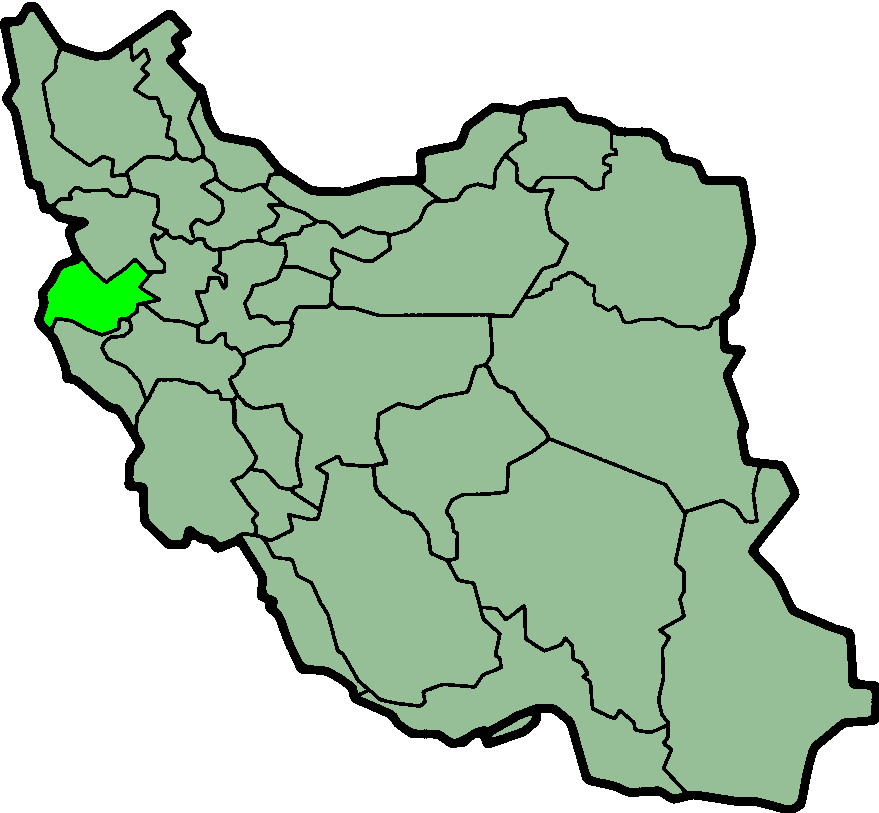
Jeyhounabad, Iran

Hajj Nematollah (Persian: حاجی نعمت‌الله 1871 – 28 February 1920) was an influential mystic and religious leader of the Qajar era. He was born in Jeyhounabad, Iran and is considered one of the greatest leaders and mystics in Kurdish and Ahl-e Haqq history. Two of his most famous works of poetry and history are Furqān al-Akhbar (aka "The Firkan") and Ḥaqq al-Ḥaqāyiq yā Shāhnāmah-ʾi Ḥaqīqat. According to Encyclopædia Britannica, "The chief source of information about the Ahl-e Haqq is the Firqan al-Akhbar, written in... early 20th century by (Hajj Nemat)…"

== Early life ==
Hajj Nemat's great-grandfather, Bayan Beg, accompanied Aga Abbas (one of the successors of Shah Hayas) to Jeyhounabad in the late 18th century. Bayan Beg's son, Esmail Beg, was Hajj Nemat's grandfather. His father was from the Mokri tribe while his mother was from the Jalilvand tribe.

Nematollah Jeyhounabadi was born in 1871 (1288 Hijri calendar) in the small Kurdish village of Jeyhounabad. Before his birth, Iran was going through droughts and the Persian famine of 1870–1872. His father, Bayan, named him Nematollah ("Grace of God") because on the day of his birth, Iran finally received the rain it so desperately needed.

In 1893, he married Sakina and they had their first child, Nur Ali Elahi, in 1895. At the age of thirty, during a grave illness, he claimed that he went on a journey to the beyond where he was appointed by God to announce the imminent return of the divine. Thousands of people flocked around him, and on his command ceased to take tea, tobacco and opium. He "believed the time had come to reveal the Real Truth", and "by God’s command abandoned the world and became the messenger of the Lord of the Hour”. After the advent was postponed twice, he went silent and waited for the Great Essence to appear.

== His family ==
Hajj Nemat was married to Sakina Khanoom, with whom he had 7 children. They had 3 sons, and four daughters. The names of his sons were Nur Ali Elahi, Yar Ali, Bahram, and his daughters were Malak Jân Nemati, Mariam and two daughters by the name of Javaher. His first daughter Javaher died at an early age, thus the next daughter was named after her. Only three of Hajj Nemat's children lived to adulthood, Nur Ali, Malak Jân, and Mariam, the rest all died as children due to illness. In the last few days of his life Hajj Nemat had predicted his own death. Within 48 hours of his death his first grandchild, Hajj Amin Elahi, was born.

== Forqan ol-Akhbar ==
The original manuscript of Forqan ol-Akhbar was completed in 1910 by Hajj Nemat and is written in four parts. His son Nur Ali Elahi wrote an introduction to Forqan ol-Akhbar and the biography of his father under the title of Kashf Al-Haqa’iq (which is approximately the first 14 pages of the manuscript, and features Nur Ali Elahi's calligraphy). Forqan ol-Akhbar is the only manuscript entirely handwritten by Hajj Nemat and is considered a historical masterpiece. Hajj Nemat gave the manuscript to Dr. Saeed Khan Kordestani in order for him to transport it to France to have it translated by Dr. Vladimir Minorsky. Unfortunately Dr. Minorsky died in 1966 before the manuscript was fully translated and published. After Minorsky's death the manuscript became misplaced and remains unpublished as of this date.

=== Part one ===
The first part of Forqan ol-Akhbar deals with the fundamental principles of the haqiqat established in pre-eternity by the Divinity who in the stage of ya-yi ghaybat became externalized in the garment of Khawandagar. The law remained concealed till the coming of Sultan Sahak. Then the daftardars recorded these doctrines, but each in his own way and according to the sources which were accessible to him. As a result, the Ahl-e Haqq community has no single sacred book, and its divisions are distinguished by different views. The Ahl-e Haqq required a kutb-I kull which would be unique. So after 1324/1906 Ne’matollah, by God's command, abandoned the world and became the "messenger of the Lord of the hour", of Pir Benyamin (explained as bin + ya + amin "faithful son of Ya"). Then comes the explanation of reincarnation (gardish-e dun be-dun, "going from one garment to another"). The creatures of the world are divided into two distinct categories according to their original element (zarda-gil or khak-i siyah). To the first belong the saved and luminous beings, whose receptive sardars are Benyamin and Sayyid Muhammad (in his Avatar of Buzurg-sawar). To the other category belong beings of fire and darkness whose respective sardars are Iblis and Khannas, with whom are associated the first three caliphs, Mu’awiya, Aisha, etc. The intermixture of the two categories of beings produces combinations which may be externally recognized.

=== Part two ===
The second part of the treatise is mainly concerned with the correspondence of the avatars through the ages. Thus manifestations of Benyamin are Noah, Jesus and provisionally (mihman) Rustam of the Persian epic; those of Razbar: Bilkis, the Queen of Saba; Mary, the mother of Jesus, etc.; those of Sayyid Muhammad: Zoroaster, Muhammad, etc. Next we are given the history of Sultan Sahak (Ishak) and of his successors.

=== Part three ===
The third part relates the personal experiences of Hajj Ne’matollah and the commandments which he received from God during his journey to the beyond (safar-I ukba), notably his mission to unite the 12 Ahl-e Haqq khanadans, to give absolution from sins (az khiyanat pak namudan) and to intercede (shifa’at) with the Lord of Time.

=== Part four ===
The fourth part is a full description of rites and customs (amr wa-nahy), with the Gurani text of the formulae recited on each occasion.

== Ḥaqq al-Ḥaqāyiq yā Shāhnāmah-ʾi Ḥaqīqat ==
The style of Ḥaqq al-Ḥaqāyiq yā Shāhnāmah-ʾi Ḥaqīqat is poetic. There is an entire chapter about Ali, "The beginning was Ali and the end is Ali. Both worlds are luminous from the light of Ali. Ali is the manifestation of the pure essence of God, He is the King and Lord of both worlds. A sparkle of His essence, like the sun appeared at my time. I became so illuminated by him, that I knew of no God, other than Him."

== Other works ==
Hajj Nemat wrote about 20 books and essays. Among them is Edalat Nameh (The book of Justice) which is concerning government. Forqan ol-Akhbar, Shah-Nama, and Kuch-e Kurdi (in Kurdish verse) are all about the same subject. He also has a "Masnavi" in Persian and there is a book of his predictions. In this book, the duration of the Pahlavi dynasty and their destiny in World War II can be found and there are also predictions about World War III and other subjects.

== See also ==
- List of Kurdish scholars
