= The Path of Perfection =

Book by Bahram Elahi

- Second Edition (2005) - The path of Perfection
- Author: Bahram Elahi, M.D.
- Original title: La Voie de la perfection
- Translator: Monica Stevens, Michael Miller
- Language: French (La Voie de la perfection)
- Genre: Treatise
- Published: 1976 (Seghers Publishers, 1st edition); 2002 (Albin Michel, revised); 2005 (Paraview, revised edition in English)
- Publication place: France
- Pages: 255
- ISBN: 978-0-9764986-0-5

The Path of Perfection is a book written by Bahram Elahi presenting an approach to the philosophy of his father Ostad Elahi. It was published in 2005 by Paraview Inc. It is the English translation of the latest edition of the French book La Voie de la Perfection, which was published in 2002 by Albin Michel Publishers after substantial revisions by the author. La Voie de la Perfection was first published in 1976 by Seghers Publishers and has thus far been translated and published in six languages.

== Summary ==
The book presents the essence of Ostad Elahi's philosophy. Bahram Elahi sets forth the major aspects of a system of thought which aims at bringing out the conditions of man's process toward perfection by dealing with subjects such as the specificity of human beings, the consequences of our actions, etc. As mentioned in the Preface, this work has been conceived as a concise and practical handbook. The principles stated and the resulting concepts are developed and analysed more thoroughly by the author in other books.

== The author ==
Bahram Elahi is the second son of Ostad Elahi. A graduate of Montpellier University, he is a Doctor of Medicine and a Professor Emeritus in paediatric surgery. Parallel to his professional career, he has pursued thorough study of ethics and spirituality for over 40 years based on the philosophy of his father, Ostad Elahi and has written several books analysing his teachings. He is also the President of the Fondation Ostad Elahi: Ethics and Human Solidarity.
