= Burhan al-Haqq =

Burhan al-Haqq or Borhan ol-Haqq ( (Persian: برهان الحق, 'Demonstration of the Truth') is a 1963 (1342 Persian calendar) theological and spiritual work by Nur Ali Elahi dedicated to showing the inner spiritual aims shared by the Quran, Shia Islam and the original teachings and practices of the Ahl-e Haqq order.

In 1964, Dr. Simon Weightman wrote a piece titled "The significance of Kitab Burhan al- Haqq".

Elahi states that he has left "nothing unsaid", in the books he wrote. "Even if you read Burhan al-Haqq a thousand times, you will find something new in it each time. He also states "know that Burhan al-Haqq cannot be abridged. There are many secrets in my book... It is only after me that people will understand what "Burhan Al-haqq" is." He states that "The higher the level of knowledge rises, the better one will comprehend the scope; the more centuries pass, the more their value will increase. I alone know how much research I have done."
