= Miyan Rahan, Kermanshah =

City in Kermanshah province, Iran

Miyan Rahan Persian: ميان راهان
- City
- Location within Iran
- Coordinates: 34°35′02″N 47°26′34″E
- Country: Iran
- Province: Kermanshah
- County: Sahneh
- District: Dinavar

Population (2016)
  - Total: 695
- Time zone: UTC+3:30 (IRST)

Miyan Rahan (Persian: ميان راهان) (Note: Also romanized as Meyān Rāhān, Mīān Rāhān, and Mīyān Rāhān) is a city in, and the capital of, Dinavar District of Sahneh County, Kermanshah province, Iran. It also serves as the administrative center for Dinavar Rural District.

== Demographics ==
=== Language ===
Its people speak the Laki dialect.

=== Population ===
At the time of the 2006 National Census, the city's population was 489 in 131 households. The following census in 2011 counted 598 people in 177 households. The 2016 census measured the population of the city as 695 people in 206 households.
