= Kalakan (disambiguation) =

Kalkan may refer to:

- Kalakan, village located in the Kabul Province, Afghanistan
- Kalakan (band), music band from the northern Basque Country, Spain
- Kalakan (river), river in Russia
- Kalakan District, in the northern part of Kabul Province, Afghanistan

== See also ==
- Kalkan (disambiguation)
