= Nur Ali Elahi =

Iranian philosopher, judge and musician (1895–1974)

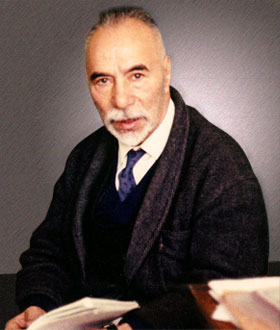
- Nur Ali Elahi in 1967
- Born: 11 September 1895; Jeyhunabad, Kermanshah, Qajar Iran
- Died: 19 October 1974 (aged 79); Tehran, Pahlavi Iran
- Resting place: Koye Noor, Hashtgerd
- Other name: Ostad Elahi
- Occupation: Chief Justice of the Supreme Court of Appeals for Mazandaran province
- Website: ostadelahi.com

Nur Ali Elahi (or Ostad Elahi var. Nūr 'Alī Ilāhī, Nour Ali Elahi, Persian: نورعلی الهی – استاد الهی; 11 September 1895 – 19 October 1974) was an Iranian philosopher, judge and musician of Kurdish descent whose work investigated the metaphysical dimension of human beings.

== Early life ==
Elahi was born in Jeyhunabad, a small Kurdish village near the eponymous capital of Kermanshah province. His father, Hajj Nematollah (1871–1920), was a mystic and poet who was a leader of the Ahl-e Haqq and revered as a saint. From early childhood, he led an ascetic, secluded life of rigorous discipline under his father's supervision with a special focus on mysticism, music, and ethics. In addition to religious and moral instruction, he received the classical education of the time. During study and contemplation in his youth, he established the basis of his philosophical and spiritual reflections.

By the time his father died in 1919, Elahi had concluded that the time for classical spirituality had come to an end, and that the quest for spiritual development could no longer take place in the tranquility of ascetic seclusion. Instead, he believed that spirituality had to be practiced within the context of an active and productive life in the midst of society. Thus, at the age of twenty-four he left behind a contemplative life to test his ethical principles in society. Eventually settling in the capital city of Tehran, he cut his long hair and beard, replaced his traditional robes with a Western-style suit, and entered the civil service.

== Judicial career ==
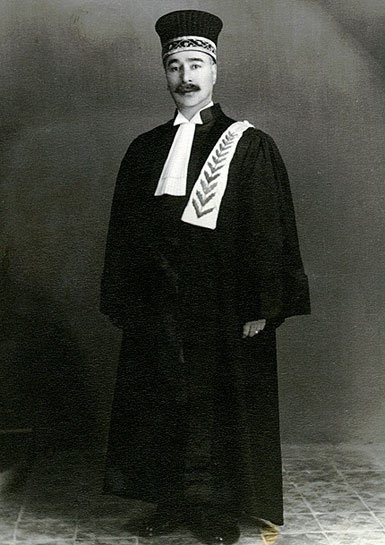
As a Court of Appeals judge in 1949

A few years later, as the country was undergoing extensive governmental reforms that included the establishment of an entirely new judicial system, Elahi enrolled in the newly formed National School of Jurisprudence. He finished a three-year curriculum in six months, and graduated with distinction in 1934.

Elahi then began a 23-year legal career, with his first assignment as Justice of the Peace in Larestan County, Fars province, and culminating in his appointment as Chief Justice of the Court of Appeals and the High Court of Criminal Appeals of Mazandaran province. He was highly regarded both for the precision with which he observed rights and duties, and for the importance he placed on the rule of law and women's rights. Elahi retired in 1957 at the age of 62 and settled in Tehran.

Throughout his legal career, Elahi devoted time to personal studies and research, especially in philosophy and theology. This period of metaphysical investigation helped him to formulate his later works.

== Philosophy ==
Elahi's philosophy addresses questions about the origin and nature of human beings, their role and responsibilities in the world, and their ultimate destination. His work highlights the idea of the duality of man as both a material and spiritual being, and reasserts the importance of their metaphysical dimension. He believed that self-realization requires more than mere reflection, and that spirituality, like any science, must necessarily be grounded in verifiable experiences. Elahi's written and oral teachings are thus the direct result of his personal experiences, rather than philosophical reflections.

== Writings ==
Elahi began to gradually reveal his system of thought after his retirement from the judiciary in 1957. During this time he wrote and published two scholarly works in the fields of religious science and authentic spirituality, as well as an extensive commentary on his father's writings. The practical aspect of his thought, on the other hand, was conveyed mostly in the form of oral teachings and instruction to close friends and acquaintances who sought his advice and guidance. Two volumes of his sayings have been published to date on the basis of notes transcribed by these individuals. He also authored several manuscripts that remain unpublished, including Unveiling of the Truths (Kashf al-Haqa'iq), which describes the genesis of the universe and the role of human beings.

In 1963, Elahi published his first book, "Demonstration of the Truth" (Borhan ol-Haqq), a theological work which presented for the first time an authoritative historical account of the Ahl-e Haqq, including its development, fundamental principles, and sacred rites, which until then had been kept secret. The book also addressed the esoteric aims shared in common by the Qur'an, Islam, and the Ahl-e Haqq.

In 1966, he published his second work, "Commentary on the Book of the Kings of Truth" (Hashieh bar Haqq ol-Haqayeq), a commentary on his father's epic poem that expounded upon the determination of places and dates, the historical accuracy of certain events cited therein, and the concept of "divine manifestation".

His third and final published work, a philosophical treatise titled "Knowing the Spirit" (Marefat ol-Ruh), was published in 1969 and describes his ideas on the existence and immortality of the soul, and on the soul's gradual process of maturation and perfection.

== Music ==
Elahi Playing the Tanbur
Improvisation in Bâbâ Jalili
An excerpt from a track on the CD Destinations

Suite Sahari
An excerpt from a track on the CD The Celestial Music of Ostad Elahi

For Elahi, music was primarily a means of engaging in contemplation and prayer. He never performed in public and did not make any recordings of his music in a professional setting.

Elahi's music is rooted in a tradition involving the rhythmic recital and invocation of sacred texts in devotional gatherings, accompanied by various instruments such as the tanbur (an ancient lute), the ney (reed flute) and the daf (frame drum).

Elahi began playing the tanbur at the age of six and was recognized as a master of the tanbur by the age of nine. He would eventually revive this ancient art, composing over 100 original pieces that he used as the basis for his improvisations. His musical ornamentations and complex playing technique, which for the first time involved the use of all five fingers of both hands, as well as his physical modifications to the instrument itself – namely, the doubling of the higher string so as to dramatically increase its expressiveness – earned him a reputation as an innovator of this art form and a master of the tanbur.

Since the commemoration of his centennial in 1995, eleven CDs of his music have been released. The bulk of the original recordings were made on basic mono tape recording equipment during the 1960s and '70's in the context of informal gatherings with family and friends. These tapes have since been digitally remastered and restored.

One of the characteristic aspects of Elahi's music was the use of improvisation, in which he would weave together pieces of diverse tempo and rhythm while maintaining a coherent whole. One such piece, Improvisations in Baba Jalili in the fourth followed by the Suite Zang-e Shotori in the second, found on the CD Destinations (Le Chant du Monde, 2008) exemplifies this aspect. Here, Elahi shifts back and forth between several different melodies and mixes the rhythm of one melody into that of another.

Elahi's tanbur playing was also known for its use of complex ornamentations and the density of the notes, with up to 12 notes being played per second at times. These features are apparent in Suite Sahari from the CD The Celestial Music of Ostad Elahi (Le Chant du Monde, 2004), a melody which was played at dawn to awaken dervishes for prayer.

Elahi personally taught the entirety of his repertoire for the tanbur to his youngest son, Dr. Chahrokh Elahi, who has recorded all of it on video, demonstrating Elahi's style and technique.

== Legacy ==
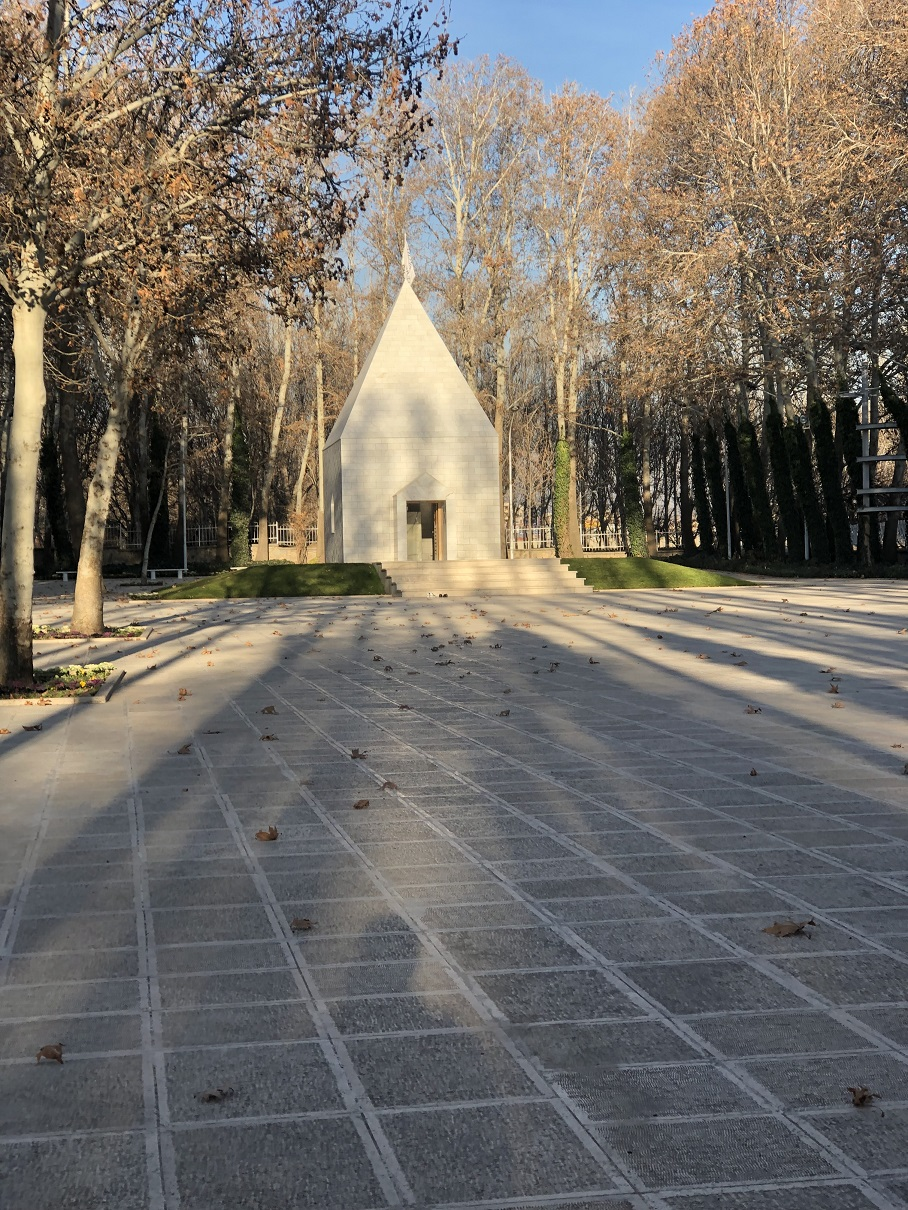
Tomb of Nur Ali Elahi

During the latter part of his life, Elahi was surrounded by individuals with diverse backgrounds and interests: atheists who came for a debate, musicians who sought advice on some technical point, scholars who wished to broaden the scope of his research, villagers or seekers who sought spiritual guidance. He welcomed them all and took the time to address each of their concerns.

Elahi was married and had three sons (Amin, Bahram, and Chahrokh), and three daughters (Fatemeh "Fati" Nemati, Farkhondeh, and Gita).

Elahi died on 19 October 1974, at the age of seventy-nine in Iran. A memorial was erected in his memory in Hashtgerd, a rural town located on the outskirts of Tehran.

After his death in 1974, his philosophy and teachings were continued by his son, Prof. Bahram Elahi (born 1931), a former pediatric surgeon and medical school dean who has written several books analyzing and elaborating upon this line of thinking.

=== History of the title "Ostad Elahi" ===
Born with the name "Fatollah", Nur Ali's childhood nickname was "Kuchek Ali". At the age of eleven, he went through a spiritual transformation during an ascetic retreat with his father, who subsequently changed the child's name to "Sayyed Nur Ali". In 1941, while working as an attorney general in Khorammabad, Nur Ali legally changed his family name to "Elahi".

Following his death, his sister Malak Jân Nemati (Also known as Malak Jân, Sheikh Jâni and Jâni Jân) assumed responsibility for continuing his legacy. In accordance with the custom of referring to elders with deference, Malak Jân referred to her brother with the title "Hazrat Ostad" for the next twenty years as she continued explaining his teachings.

When the Organizing Committee for the commemoration of his centennial planned the 1995 commemoration events in Paris, London, New York, Los Angeles, and Tehran, they had to translate the title "Hazrat-e Ostad" into Western languages. However, the literal translation of this title in English conflicted with Elahi's reputation for humility (for example, His Highness or Majesty Master Nur Ali Elahi). With the permission of his family, the Committee settled on the title "Ostad Elahi" to retain the respect intended by his sister, and to convey that he was a master musician. As a result, most books and articles written about him since 1995 have used the title "Ostad Elahi".

=== Centennial commemoration ===
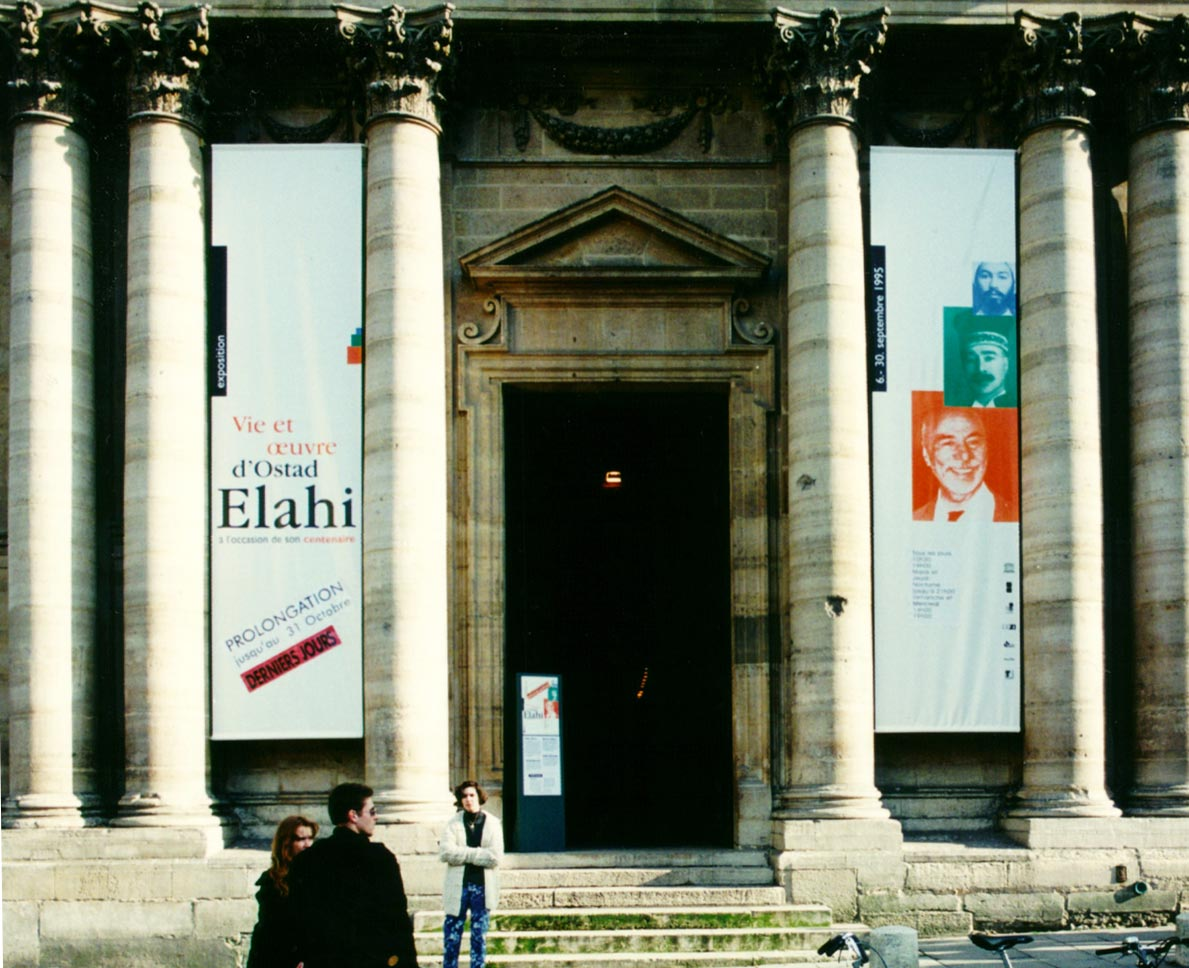
The Life and Work of Ostad Elahi Exhibition at the Chapelle de la Sorbonne in Paris

Elahi spent the greater part of his life and work in the pursuit of self-knowledge and mysticism. In 1995, to celebrate the centennial of his birth, symposia were convened at universities in Paris, London, Los Angeles, and New York, where authorities in science, jurisprudence, literature, and music gathered to reflect on the theme of "Spirituality: Plurality and Unity". Lectures and roundtables were presented on a variety of topics, including the unity of religions, ethics and jurisprudence, science and spirituality, and the relevance of contemporary mysticism.

Under the patronage of UNESCO and the French Ministry of Culture, and in collaboration with the Academy of Paris, a two-month exhibition was concurrently organized on "The Life and Work of Ostad Elahi" at the Chapelle de la Sorbonne in Paris from 6 September to 31 October 1995. The exhibition was divided into three sections that traced the chronology of his life: Dawn (1895–1920), Rising Sun (1920–1957), and Full Sun (1957–1974). Each of these periods was illustrated by a set of texts, photographs, autobiographical anecdotes, and personal objects which aimed to allow visitors to become acquainted with Elahi and the different periods of his life.

The exhibition also featured a music chamber filled with the sounds of melodies composed and played by Elahi. This music, previously reserved for devotional settings, was played publicly for the first time on this occasion. A collection of traditional instruments belonging to Elahi and his father, including tanburs, setars, and dafs, were also on display in the chamber.

=== Recent exhibitions ===
From 5 August 2014, through 11 January 2015, an exhibition at the Metropolitan Museum of Art, entitled The Sacred Lute: The Art of Ostad Elahi, presented under the patronage of UNESCO, explores the parallel between his playing of the tanbur and his approach to the quest for truth and self-knowledge.

== Bibliography ==
=== Select works by Elahi ===
==== English ====
- Words of Faith: Prayers of Ostad Elahi (Paris: Robert Laffont, 1995) ISBN 978-2-911331-02-2
- 100 Maxims of Guidance. Introduction by Bahram Elahi. (Paris: Robert Laffont, 1995) ISBN 978-2-911331-00-8
- Knowing the Spirit. Translated and with an introduction by James Winston Morris. (Albany: SUNY Press, 2007) ISBN 978-0-7914-6858-6

==== French ====
- Confidences Prières d'Ostad Elahi [Words of Faith: Prayers of Ostad Elahi]. (Robert Laffont, 1995) ISBN 978-2-221-08205-8
- 100 maximes de guidance [100 Maxims of Guidance]. (Robert Laffont, 1995) ISBN 978-2221082065
- Connaissance de l'âme [Knowing the Spirit]. Translated by Clara Deville. (L'Harmattan, 2001) ISBN 2-7475-0452-2
- Paroles de Vérité [Words of Truth]. Translated by Leili Anvar. (Paris: Albin Michel, 2014) ISBN 978-2-226-253910
- Maximes de guidance: Principes de sagesse universelle [Maxims of Guidance: Principles of Universal Wisdom]. (Pocket Agora, 2015) ISBN 978-2266227773

==== Italian ====
- Pensieri di Luce [100 Maxims of Guidance]. (Mondadori, 2000) ISBN 978-88-04-44810-5

==== Persian ====
- Borhan-ol Haqq (Persian: برهان الحق) [Demonstration of the Truth] 1st ed. (Amir Kabir, 1963)
- Hashieh bar Haqq ol-Haqayeq (Persian: حق الحقايق) [Commentary on Shahnameh Haqiqat (The Book of the Kings of Truth)] (Husseini, 1967)
- Marefat-ol Ruh (Persian: معرفت الروح) [Knowing the Spirit] 1st edition (Tahuri, 1969)
- Asar-ol Haqq (Persian: آثارالحق) [Traces of Truth] ed. B. Elahi. Volume I (Jeyhun, 1978)
- Asar-ol Haqq (Persian: آثارالحق) [Traces of Truth] ed. B. Elahi. Volume II (Jeyhun, 1992)
- Bargozideh (Persian: برگزیده) [Words of Truth] ed. Bahram Elahi. (Nashr-e Panj, 2009)

=== Select works on Elahi's life and philosophy ===
==== English ====
- Malak Jan Nemati: Life Isn't Short, but Time Is Limited. Leili Anvar. (New York: Arpeggio Press, 2012). ISBN 978-0-9834320-2-9
- Self-knowledge and the practice of ethics: Ostad Elahi's concept of the "imperious self". Elie During. (2011). Annals of the New York Academy of Sciences, 1234: 149–157. doi: 10.1111/j.1749-6632.2011.06203.x
- Shifting Perspectives: Changing Your Outlook for Positive Results. Olivier Brizevac and Emmanuel Comte, translated by Benjamin Ivry. (New York: Paraview, 2007) ISBN 978-0-9764986-5-0
- Ostad Elahi on Spirituality in Everyday Life. James W. Morris. (Public Lecture presented at University of California at Santa Barbara, Department of Religion, May 2, 2007)
- Overcoming Jealousy. Beatrice Guernier and Agnes Rousseau, translated by Benjamin Ivry. (New York: Paraview, 2006) ISBN 978-0-9764986-4-3
- The Path of Perfection. Bahram Elahi. (New York: Paraview, 2005) ISBN 978-0-9764986-0-5
- Orientations: Islamic Thought in a World Civilization. James Winston Morris. (London: Archetype, 2004) ISBN 978-1-901383-10-2
- The Spirit of Sounds: The Unique Art of Ostad Elahi. Jean During. (New York: Cornwall Books, 2003) ISBN 978-0-8453-4884-0
- Medicine of the Soul: Foundations of Natural Spirituality. Bahram Elahi. (New York: Cornwall Books, 2001) ISBN 978-0-8453-4875-8
- Spirituality is a Science: Foundations of Natural Spirituality. Bahram Elahi. (New York: Cornwall Books, 1999) ISBN 978-0-8453-4868-0
- Foundations of Natural Spirituality: A Scientific Approach to the Nature of the Spiritual Self. Bahram Elahi (Dorset: Element Books, 1998) ISBN 978-1-86204-238-4
- "Symposium on Spirituality Celebrates the Centennial of Ostad Elahi". In UNESCO News, Vol. 2, No. 6, (November 10, 1995)
- The Life and Work of Ostad Elahi. Directed by Marion Sarraut. (A video published on the occasion of his centenary in 1995)
- "Unicity" A Collection of Photographs of Ostad Elahi 1895-1974. [Centennial Commemoration Volume] (Paris: Robert Laffont, 1995) ISBN 978-2-911331-01-5
- The Way of Light. Bahram Elahi. (Dorset: Element Books, 1993) ISBN 978-1-85230-381-5

==== French ====
- Fondamentaux du perfectionnement spirituel; le guide pratique. Bahram Elahi. (Paris: Dervy, 2019) ISBN 979-10-242-0412-3
- La Voie de la Perfection: Introduction á la pensée d’Ostad Elahi. Bahram Elahi (Paris: Albin Michel, 2018) ISBN 978-2-226-40050-5
- Ostad Elahi et la tradition: Droit, philosophie et mystique en Iran – Vol I. S. Marin (Bruxelles: éditions Safran, 2011) ISBN 978-2-87457-037-7
- Ostad Elahi et la modernité. Droit, philosophie et magistrature en Iran – Vol II. S. Marin (Bruxelles: éditions Safran, 2011) ISBN 978-2-87457-038-4
- Vérité et jugement: Ostad Elahi, juge et philosophe iranien (1895–1974). S. Marin. Thèse de l'Université de Paris-X, Nanterre (2006)
- Ostad Elahi et les droits de l'homme: Ethique et modernité, in Le Code civil et les droits de l'homme, textes réunis et publiés par Jean-Luc Chabot, Philippe Didier, Jérôme Ferrand, (Paris: L'Harmattan, 2005) pp. 418–434. ISBN 2-7475-8893-9
- Une philosophie du droit en Islam? Un exemple iranien, Journées de la recherche en théorie et philosophie juridiques et politiques, p. 23
- La Voie de la Perfection. Bahram Elahi. (Paris: Albin Michel, 2002) ISBN 978-2-226-13260-4
- L'éveil de l'intelligence spirituelle et les dimensions du processus éthique selon Ostad Elahi. James Winston Morris. In Dieu a-t-il sa place dans la ethique?, ed. E. During, 86–99. (Paris: L'Harmattan, 2002) ISBN 2-7475-2168-0
- L'âme des sons. Jean During. (Gordes: Editions du Relié, 2001) ISBN 978-2-909698-71-7
- Le rôle de la traduction et de l'interprétation du droit en Iran dans la première moitié du XXème siècle: l'exemple d'Ostad Elahi (1895–1974), S. Marin and F. Ameli. Droit et Cultures, Revue trimestrielle d'anthropologie et d'histoire, publiée avec le concours du CNRS, 44/2001, pp. 183–201.
- Médecine de l'âme. Bahram Elahi. (Paris: Editions Dervy, 2000) ISBN 978-2-84454-023-2
- La spiritualité est une science. Bahram Elahi. (Paris: Editions Dervy, 1997) ISBN 978-2-85076-927-6
- Fondements de la Spiritualité Naturelle. Bahram Elahi. (Paris: Editions Dervy, 1996) ISBN 978-2-85076-860-6
- Le Spirituel: Pluralité et Unité [The Acta of the Symposium, "Spirituality: Plurality and Unity"] (Presses de l'Université de Paris-Sorbonne, 1996)
- La Pensée d'Ostad Elahi. James Winston Morris. In Le Spirituel: pluralité et unité, actes du symposium (Cahiers d'Anthropologie Religieuse, ed. M. Meslin, volume 5), 137-147 (Presses de l'Université, 1996)
- De l'unité des religions. Andrei Chouraqui. Cahiers d'Anthropologie Religieuse, n° 5, under the direction of Professor Michel Meslin, University of Paris-Sorbonne Press, 1996, pp. 25–33, 187–88
- Ethique et droit. F. Terre, Symposium in French Supreme Court (Sept. 1995), in Cahiers d'Anthropologie Religieuse, n° 5, under the direction of Professor Michel Meslin, University of Paris-Sorbonne Press, 1996, pp. 179–186.
- Musique et Mystique Dans Les Traditions de L'Iran. Jean During. (Paris: Institut français de recherche en Iran, 1989) ISBN 978-90-6831-191-4
- Le Chemin de la Lumière. Bahram Elahi. (Paris: Albin Michel, 1985) ISBN 978-2-226-02467-1

==== German ====
- Medizin der Seele. Bahram Elahi. (Wien: Ibera Verlag, 2007) ISBN 978-3-85052-157-4
- Spiritualität ist eine Wissenschaft. Bahram Elahi. (Wien: Ibera Verlag, 2001) ISBN 978-3-85052-112-3
- Grundlagen Natürlicher Spiritualität. Bahram Elahi. (Wien: Ibera Verlag, 1999) ISBN 978-3-900436-85-8
- Weg und Vollendung. Bahram Elahi. (München: Heyne, 1995) ISBN 978-3-453-08744-6

==== Italian ====
- La Via della Perfezione. Bahram Elahi. (Astrolabio Ubaldini, 2004) ISBN 978-88-340-0699-3

==== Polish ====
- Droga do doskonałości. Bahram Elahi. (Warszawa: Nowe Wydawnictwo Polskie, 1991) ISBN 978-83-85135-07-4

==== Greek ====
- Ή ὁδὸς τῆς τελειότητας. Bahram Elahi. (Εκάτη, 1994)

== Discography ==
- The Celestial Music of Ostad Elahi (1996), CMT 774 1026 Le Chant du Monde (Originally released in 1995 as The Celestial Music of Ostad Elahi Vol. I)
- Dialogue with the Beloved (1997), CMT 774 1100 Le Chant du Monde (Originally released in 1995 as The Celestial Music of Ostad Elahi Vol. II)
- Paths of Divine Love (1997), CMT 774 1083 Le Chant du Monde
- A Spiritual Epic (1998), CMT 774 1432 Le Chant du Monde
- Celestial Harmonies (1999), CMT 774 1122 Le Chant du Monde
- Mystical Orison (2000), CMT 774 1137 Le Chant du Monde
- Cascade (2002), CMT 774 1150 Le Chant du Monde
- Celestial Danses (2005), CMT 774 1327 Le Chant du Monde
- Destinations (Double CD) (2008), CMT 774 1626 Le Chant du Monde
- Presence (2014), CMT 774 2300 Le Chant du Monde
- The Sacred Lute: The Art of Ostad Elahi (Double CD) (2014), CMT 874 2259 Le Chant du Monde / The Metropolitan Museum of Art
- Awakening (2014), CMT 774 2367 Le Chant du Monde
- Résilience (2019), CMT 774 3013 Le Chant du Monde – Harmonia Mundi / The Metropolitan Museum of Art
- My Beginning and My End (2019), CMT 774 3012 Le Chant du Monde / Harmonia Mundi / The Metropolitan Museum of Art
- The Eternal and the Ephemeral (2022), CMT 774 3020 Le Chant du Monde / Harmonia Mundi
