= Leili Anvar =

Iranian author and translator (b. 1967)

- لیلی انور
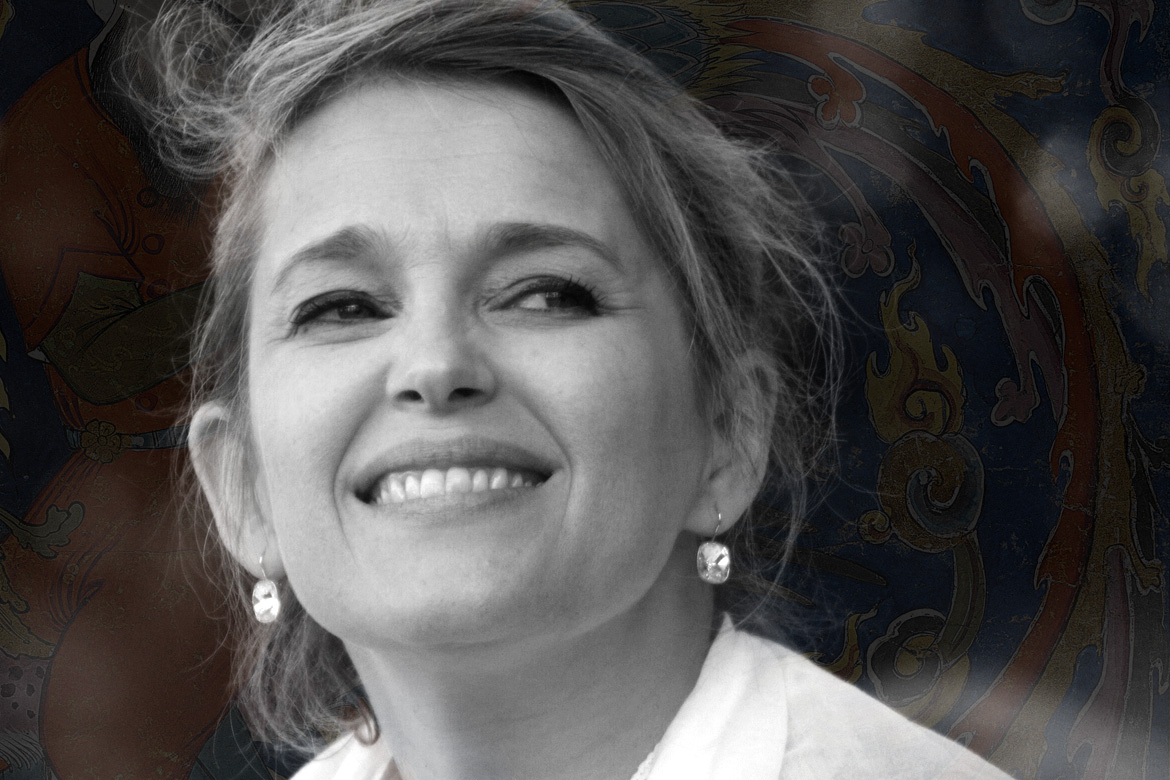
- Born: 28 May 1967 (age 59); Tehran, Imperial Iran
- Education: École normale supérieure Lycée La Bruyère
- Title: Chevalière of the Ordre des Arts et des Lettres
- Parents: Manuchehr Anvar (father); Dominique Anvar (mother)
- Relatives: Iraj Anvar (uncle)
- Website: leilianvar.com

Leili Anvar (Persian: لیلی انور; born 28 May 1967) is an Iranian-born French writer and translator, specializing in Persian poetry and mystic literature. She is an associate professor in Persian language and literature at INALCO.

== Early life and education ==
Leili Anvar was born in Tehran, Imperial Iran, to a French mother, Dominique Anvar, Persian-French translator, and an Iranian father, Manuchehr Anvar, Persian writer, editor, translator, director and radio presenter.

A former student of Razi High School in Tehran, and later of La Bruyère High School in Versailles, she entered the École Normale Supérieure in 1987. She obtained her degree in English literature in 1991 and received her PhD in Persian literature from the Sorbonne in 1998.

== Career ==
Anvar has been an associate professor of Persian literature at the National Institute of Oriental Languages and Civilizations (INALCO) since 2001, and she is part of the CERMOM research team (main affiliation).

In 2017, Anvar was selected to head the Festival of Persian-Speaking Communities which was held in Paris in January 2018.

== Works ==
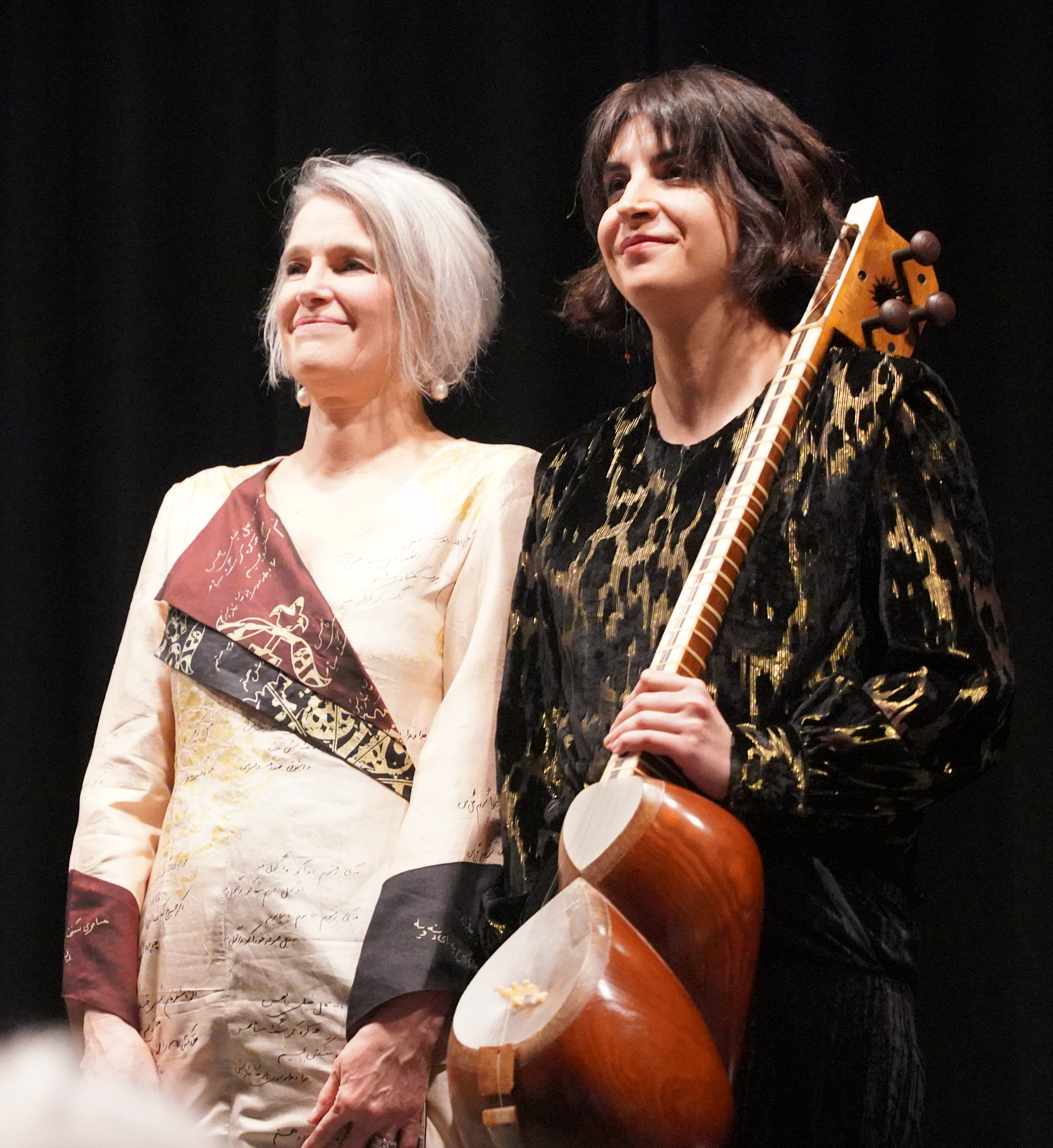
2025

Anvar's work is mainly dedicated to the study of mystical literature as well as Persian romantic literature and its spiritual developments. Leili Anvar also contributes to the understanding of Sufism, Persian culture, history, literature, and spirituality.

=== General research themes ===
- Persian mystical literature (medieval period)
- Contemporary women's literature (Iran, Afghanistan)

=== Ongoing research ===
- The expression of love in Persian literature
- Articulation between secular poetry and mystical poetry
- Contemporary Afghan and Iranian women poets

As a translator and specialist in mystical literature, in addition to a large number of academic articles, she has notably worked on the works of the 13th-century Persian mystical poet Jalāl ad-Dīn Rūmī. She published Rūmī with Entrelacs editions, a book about the life and works of the poet, followed by an anthology of his works.

She directed the publication of an anthology of Arabic, Persian, and Turkish poetry titled Orient – Mille ans de poésie et de peinture (Orient - A Thousand Years of Poetry and Painting), for which she translated the Persian poems in 2009.

She is also credited with a biography of the Kurdish-Persian poet Malek Jân Ne’mati, followed by an anthology of her works: Malek Jân Ne’mati, 'Life is not short, but time is limited'.

She translated into French verse the Manṭiq-uṭ-Ṭayr a mystical masterpiece by the Persian poet Attar under the title Le Cantique des Oiseaux.

In 2021, she published the translation of Layla and Majnun by Jami, illustrated by Oriental miniatures.

== Books ==
- Mawlânâ Djalâl Od-Dîn Rûmî, "Rumi", textes choisis et présentés par Leili Anvar, 2011, Points, coll. « Sagesses » ISBN 9782757814307
- Paroles de Vérités d'Ostad Elahi, traduction inédite, éditions Albin Michel, 2014
- Le Cantique des oiseaux d‘Attâr illustré par la peinture en Islam d'Orient, new verse translation, éditions Diane de Selliers, 2012 ISBN 978-2-36437-003-6
- 'Taking Flight', introduction (transl. John Adamson) to Farīd-od-Dīn 'Attār's The Canticle of the Birds (verse transl. from the Persian by Afkham Darbandi and Dick Davis), illustrated through Persian and eastern Islamic art, éditions Diane de Selliers 2013 ISBN 978-2-36437-031-9
- Malek Jân Ne'mati : la vie n'est pas courte mais le temps est compté, éditions Diane de Selliers, 2007 ISBN 978-2903656416
- Rûmî, Entrelacs, 2004 ISBN 290-8606178
- Trésors dévoilés : anthologie de l'islam spirituel (avec Makram Abbes), éditions du Seuil, 2009 ISBN 978-2-02-096402-9
- Orient : mille ans de poésie et de peinture, éditions Diane de Selliers, 2004 ISBN 978-2-903656-43-0
- Jâmi (2021). Leyli et Majnûn. éditions Diane de Selliers. p. 432. ISBN 9782364371200.
- Le Cri des femmes afghanes. Bruno Doucey. 2022. p. 224. ISBN 978-2362294259.

== Honours and awards ==
- Chevalière of the ordre des Arts et des Lettres
- Winner of the Iran Book Award 2014 in the literary translation category.
- Mevlana Awards, 2014
- Shams and Rumi Institute awards, Téhéran, 2015
