= Kanduleh, Sahneh =

Village in Kermanshah province, Iran

Kanduleh Persian: كندوله
- Village
- Location within Iran
- Coordinates: 34°39′06″N 47°13′33″E
- Country: Iran
- Province: Kermanshah
- County: Sahneh
- District: Dinavar
- Rural District: Kanduleh

Population (2016)
  - Total: 522
- Time zone: UTC+3:30 (IRST)

Kanduleh (Persian: كندوله) (Note: Also romanized as Kandūleh; and Kenüle (Kurdish: کەنۊلە)) is a village in, and the capital of, Kanduleh Rural District of Dinavar District, Sahneh County, Kermanshah province, Iran.

== Demographics ==
=== Language ===
The local language is Gorani.

=== Population ===
At the time of the 2006 National Census, the village's population was 879 in 247 households. The following census in 2011 counted 815 people in 221 households. The 2016 census measured the population of the village as 522 people in 161 households. It was the most populous village in its rural district.
