= Jamishan-e Olya, Sonqor =

Jamishan-e Olya جاميشان عليا
- Village
- Location within Iran
- Coordinates: 34°42′10″N 47°26′49″E
- Country: Iran
- Province: Kermanshah
- County: Sonqor
- Bakhsh: Central
- Rural District: Sarab

Population (2006)
  - Total: 267
- Time zone: UTC+3:30 (IRST)
  - Summer (DST): UTC+4:30 (IRDT)

Jamishan-e Olya (Persian: جاميشان عليا, also Romanized as Jāmīshān-e ‘Olyā) is a village in Sarab Rural District, in the Central District of Sonqor County, Kermanshah Province, Iran. At the 2006 census, its population was 267, between 56 families.
