= Gand Ab, Kermanshah =

Gand Ab گنداب
- Village
- Location within Iran
- Coordinates: 34°43′54″N 46°56′41″E
- Country: Iran
- Province: Kermanshah
- County: Kermanshah
- Bakhsh: Central
- Rural District: Razavar

Population (2006)
  - Total: 296
- Time zone: UTC+3:30 (IRST)
  - Summer (DST): UTC+4:30 (IRDT)

Gand Ab (Persian: گنداب, also Romanized as Gand Āb and Gandāb) is a village in Razavar Rural District, in the Central District of Kermanshah County, Kermanshah Province, Iran. At the 2006 census, its population was 296, in 70 families.
