= Gandab, Chaharmahal and Bakhtiari =

Gandab گنداب
- Village
- Location within Iran
- Coordinates: 31°18′13″N 51°08′07″E
- Country: Iran
- Province: Chaharmahal and Bakhtiari
- County: Lordegan
- Bakhsh: Falard
- Rural District: Poshtkuh

Population (2006)
  - Total: 270
- Time zone: UTC+3:30 (IRST)
  - Summer (DST): UTC+4:30 (IRDT)

Gandab (Persian: گنداب, also Romanized as Gandāb) is a village in Poshtkuh Rural District, Falard District, Lordegan County, Chaharmahal and Bakhtiari Province, Iran. At the 2006 census, its population was 270, in 55 families. The village is populated by Lurs.
