= Gandab, Kurdistan =

Gandab گنداب
- Village
- Location within Iran
- Coordinates: 35°28′23″N 47°17′55″E
- Country: Iran
- Province: Kurdistan
- County: Dehgolan
- Bakhsh: Central
- Rural District: Yeylan-e Shomali

Population (2006)
  - Total: 152
- Time zone: UTC+3:30 (IRST)
  - Summer (DST): UTC+4:30 (IRDT)

Gandab (Persian: گنداب, also Romanized as Gandāb; also known as Ganab) is a village in Yeylan-e Shomali Rural District, in the Central District of Dehgolan County, Kurdistan Province, Iran. At the 2006 census, its population was 152, in 33 families. The village is populated by Kurds.
