= Kandha, Iran =

Kandha كندها
- Village
- Location within Iran
- Coordinates: 33°40′41″N 49°58′19″E
- Country: Iran
- Province: Markazi
- County: Khomeyn
- Bakhsh: Kamareh
- Rural District: Khorram Dasht

Population (2006)
  - Total: 91
- Time zone: UTC+3:30 (IRST)
  - Summer (DST): UTC+4:30 (IRDT)

Kandha (Persian: كندها, also Romanized as Kandhā and Kandehā; also known as Gandāb, Kendāb, and Qandāb) is a village in Khorram Dasht Rural District, Kamareh District, Khomeyn County, Markazi Province, Iran. At the 2006 census, its population was 91, in 21 families.
