= Kalkan, Sanandaj =

Kalkan كلكان
- Village
- Location within Iran
- Coordinates: 35°25′26″N 46°54′48″E
- Country: Iran
- Province: Kurdistan
- County: Sanandaj
- Bakhsh: Central
- Rural District: Arandan

Population (2006)
  - Total: 413
- Time zone: UTC+3:30 (IRST)
  - Summer (DST): UTC+4:30 (IRDT)

Kalkan (Persian: كلكان, also Romanized as Kalkān, Kalakān, and Kalekān; also known as Kalāhkhān, Kalehkān, and Kulahkān) is a village in Arandan Rural District, in the Central District of Sanandaj County, Kurdistan Province, Iran. At the 2006 census, its population was 413, in 80 families. The village is populated by Kurds.
