= Gandab, Dorud =

Gandab گنداب
- Village
- Location within Iran
- Coordinates: 33°28′36″N 49°14′17″E
- Country: Iran
- Province: Lorestan
- County: Dorud
- Bakhsh: Central
- Rural District: Heshmatabad

Population (2006)
  - Total: 192
- Time zone: UTC+3:30 (IRST)
  - Summer (DST): UTC+4:30 (IRDT)

Gandab (Persian: گنداب, also Romanized as Gandāb) is a village in Heshmatabad Rural District, in the Central District of Dorud County, Lorestan Province, Iran. At the 2006 census, its population was 192, in 44 families.
