= Kalkan, Divandarreh =

Kalkan كلكان
- Village
- Location within Iran
- Coordinates: 36°01′17″N 46°55′20″E
- Country: Iran
- Province: Kurdistan
- County: Divandarreh
- Bakhsh: Karaftu
- Rural District: Zarrineh

Population (2006)
  - Total: 1,113
- Time zone: UTC+3:30 (IRST)
  - Summer (DST): UTC+4:30 (IRDT)

Kalkan (Persian: كلكان, also Romanized as Kalkān and Kalakān) is a village in Zarrineh Rural District, Karaftu District, Divandarreh County, Kurdistan Province, Iran. At the 2006 census, its population was 1,113, in 203 families. The village is populated by Kurds.
