= Gand Ab, Borujerd =

Gand Ab گنداب
- Village
- Location within Iran
- Coordinates: 33°58′39″N 48°45′03″E
- Country: Iran
- Province: Lorestan
- County: Borujerd
- Bakhsh: Oshtorinan
- Rural District: Oshtorinan

Population (2006)
  - Total: 25
- Time zone: UTC+3:30 (IRST)
  - Summer (DST): UTC+4:30 (IRDT)

Gand Ab (Persian: گنداب, also Romanized as Gand Āb, Ganjāb, Ganāv, Ganāu, and Gandāb) is a village in Oshtorinan Rural District, Oshtorinan District, Borujerd County, Lorestan Province, Iran. At the 2006 census, its population was 25, in 7 families.
