= Gandab-e Sofla, Kurdistan =

Gandab-e Sofla گنداب سفلي
- Village
- Location within Iran
- Coordinates: 35°05′15″N 48°07′13″E
- Country: Iran
- Province: Kurdistan
- County: Qorveh
- Bakhsh: Chaharduli
- Rural District: Chaharduli-ye Sharqi

Population (2006)
  - Total: 203
- Time zone: UTC+3:30 (IRST)
  - Summer (DST): UTC+4:30 (IRDT)

Gandab-e Sofla (Persian: گنداب سفلي, also Romanized as Gandāb-e Soflá and Gandab Sofla; also known as Gandāb-e Pā’īn and Kandāb Pāin) is a village in Chaharduli-ye Sharqi Rural District, Chaharduli District, Qorveh County, Kurdistan Province, Iran. At the 2006 census, its population was 203, in 59 families. The village is populated by Azerbaijanis.
