= Gandab-e Olya, Kurdistan =

Gandab-e Olya گنداب عليا
- Village
- Location within Iran
- Coordinates: 35°04′10″N 48°09′36″E
- Country: Iran
- Province: Kurdistan
- County: Qorveh
- Bakhsh: Chaharduli
- Rural District: Chaharduli-ye Sharqi

Population (2006)
  - Total: 918
- Time zone: UTC+3:30 (IRST)
  - Summer (DST): UTC+4:30 (IRDT)

Gandab-e Olya (Persian: گنداب عليا, also Romanized as Gandāb-e ‘Olyā and Gandab Olya; also known as Gandāb-e Bālā and Kandāb Bāla) is a village in Chaharduli-ye Sharqi Rural District, Chaharduli District, Qorveh County, Kurdistan Province, Iran. At the 2006 census, its population was 918, in 243 families. The village is populated by Azerbaijanis.
