= Dinavar Rural District =

Rural district in Kermanshah province, Iran

Dinavar Rural District Persian: دهستان دينور
- Rural District
- Location within Iran
- Coordinates: 34°36′31″N 47°27′26″E
- Country: Iran
- Province: Kermanshah
- County: Sahneh
- District: Dinavar
- Capital: Miyan Rahan

Population (2016)
  - Total: 7,924
- Time zone: UTC+3:30 (IRST)

Dinavar Rural District (Persian: دهستان دينور) is in Dinavar District of Sahneh County, Kermanshah province, Iran. It is administered from the city of Miyan Rahan.

== Demographics ==
=== Population ===
At the time of the 2006 National Census, the rural district's population was 1,076 in 297 households. There were 8,603 inhabitants in 2,530 households at the following census of 2011. The 2016 census measured the population of the rural district as 7,924 in 2,467 households. The most populous of its 54 villages was Jeyhunabad, with 872 people.
