= Kanduleh Rural District =

Rural district in Kermanshah province, Iran

Kanduleh Rural District Persian: دهستان كندوله
- Rural District
- Location within Iran
- Coordinates: 34°36′26″N 47°14′38″E
- Country: Iran
- Province: Kermanshah
- County: Sahneh
- District: Dinavar
- Capital: Kanduleh

Population (2016)
  - Total: 3,727
- Time zone: UTC+3:30 (IRST)

Kanduleh Rural District (Persian: دهستان كندوله) is in Dinavar District of Sahneh County, Kermanshah province, Iran. Its capital is the village of Kanduleh.

== Demographics ==
=== Population ===
At the time of the 2006 National Census, the rural district's population was 5,080 in 1,296 households. There were 4,559 inhabitants in 1,283 households at the following census of 2011. The 2016 census measured the population of the rural district as 3,727 in 1,155 households. The most populous of its 30 villages was Kanduleh, with 522 people.
