= Horr Rural District =

Rural district in Kermanshah province, Iran

Horr Rural District Persian: دهستان حر
- Rural District
- Location within Iran
- Coordinates: 34°43′10″N 47°18′08″E
- Country: Iran
- Province: Kermanshah
- County: Sahneh
- District: Dinavar
- Capital: Muineh

Population (2016)
  - Total: 3,998
- Time zone: UTC+3:30 (IRST)

Horr Rural District (Persian: دهستان حر) is in Dinavar District of Sahneh County, Kermanshah province, Iran. Its capital is the village of Muineh.

== Demographics ==
=== Population ===
At the time of the 2006 National Census, the rural district's population was 5,261 in 1,299 households. There were 4,692 inhabitants in 1,380 households at the following census of 2011. The 2016 census measured the population of the rural district as 3,998 in 1,299 households. The most populous of its 38 villages was Sar Takht, with 434 people.
