= Dinavar District =

District in Kermanshah province, Iran

Dinavar District Persian: بخش دینور
- District
- Location within Iran
- Coordinates: 34°39′45″N 47°21′25″E
- Country: Iran
- Province: Kermanshah
- County: Sahneh
- Capital: Miyan Rahan

Population (2016)
  - Total: 16,344
- Time zone: UTC+3:30 (IRST)

Dinavar District (Persian: بخش دینور) is in Sahneh County, Kermanshah province, Iran. Its capital is the city of Miyan Rahan. The district's name reflects the ancient city of Dinavar, the ruins of which are in the district.

== History ==
According to History of the Caliphs, Muslims controlled this area in 22 Hijri in the ruling period of Omar ibn al-Khattāb.

== Demographics ==
=== Population ===
At the time of the 2006 National Census, the district's population was 19,973 in 5,042 households. The following census in 2011 counted 18,452 people in 5,370 households. The 2016 census measured the population of the district as 16,344 inhabitants in 5,127 households.

=== Administrative divisions ===
Dinavar District Population
| Administrative Divisions | 2006 | 2011 | 2016 |
|---|---|---|---|
| Dinavar RD | 9,143 | 8,603 | 7,924 |
| Horr RD | 5,261 | 4,692 | 3,998 |
| Kanduleh RD | 5,080 | 4,559 | 3,727 |
| Miyan Rahan (city) | 489 | 598 | 695 |
| Total | 19,973 | 18,452 | 16,344 |
RD = Rural District
