= Moradabad (disambiguation) =

Moradabad is a city in Uttar Pradesh, India.

Moradabad may also refer to:

== India ==
- Moradabad division, a division of Uttar Pradesh
  - Moradabad district, the district centred on the city in Uttar Pradesh
  - Moradabad (Lok Sabha constituency), Parliament of India
  - Moradabad Airport, domestic airport
  - Moradabad railway station
- Muradabad, Sultanpur, a village in Sultanpur district, Uttar Pradesh

== Iran ==
=== Chaharmahal and Bakhtiari Province ===
- Moradabad, Chaharmahal and Bakhtiari, a village in Ardal County

=== Fars Province ===
- Moradabad, Firuzabad, a village in Firuzabad County
- Moradabad, Marvdasht, a village in Marvdasht County
- Moradabad, Shiraz, a village in Shiraz County

=== Hamadan Province ===
- Moradabad, Nahavand, a village in Nahavand County
- Moradabad, Tuyserkan, a village in Tuyserkan County

=== Hormozgan Province ===
- Moradabad, Hormozgan, a village in Rudan County

=== Ilam Province ===
- Moradabad, Ilam, a village in Darreh Shahr County

=== Isfahan Province ===
- Moradabad, Isfahan, a village in Shahreza County

=== Kerman Province ===
- Moradabad, Anbarabad, a village in Anbarabad County
- Moradabad, Arzuiyeh, a village in Arzuiyeh County
- Moradabad, Fahraj, a village in Fahraj County
- Moradabad-e Posht Rig, a village in Fahraj County
- Moradabad, Faryab, a village in Faryab County
- Moradabad, Jiroft, a village in Jiroft County
- Moradabad, Kahnuj, a village in Kahnuj County
- Moradabad, Manujan, a village in Manujan County
- Moradabad, Qaleh Ganj, a village in Qaleh Ganj County
- Moradabad, Rigan, a village in Rigan County
- Moradabad 1, a village in Rudbar-e Jonubi County
- Moradabad 2, a village in Rudbar-e Jonubi County

=== Kermanshah Province ===
- Moradabad, Kermanshah, a village in Kermanshah County
- Moradabad, Ravansar, a village in Ravansar County

=== Khuzestan Province ===
- Moradabad, Lali, a village in Lali County
- Moradabad, Masjed Soleyman, a village in Masjed Soleyman County
- Moradabad, Shush, a village in Shush County

=== Kurdistan Province ===
- Moradabad, Kurdistan, a village in Dehgolan County

=== Lorestan Province ===
- Moradabad, Delfan (disambiguation)

- Moradabad, Khaveh-ye Jonubi, a village in Khaveh-ye Jonubi Rural District, Central District, Delfan County
- Moradabad, Nurabad, a village in Nurabad Rural District, Central District, Delfan County
- Moradabad-e Gol Gol, a village in Mirbag-e Shomali Rural District, Central District, Delfan County
- Moradabad-e Mirakhur, a village in Mirbag-e Shomali Rural District, Central District, Delfan County
- Moradabad-e Pirdusti, a village in Itivand-e Shomali Rural District, Kakavand District, Delfan County
- Moradabad Nurali, a village in Nurabad Rural District, Central District, Delfan County

- Moradabad, Dowreh, a village in Dowreh County
- Moradabad, Rumeshkhan, a village in Rumeshkhan County
- Moradabad, Selseleh, a village in the Central District of Selseleh County
- Moradabad, Firuzabad, Selseleh, a village in Firuzabad District, Selseleh County

=== Markazi Province ===
- Moradabad, Markazi, a village in Arak County

=== Qazvin Province ===
- Moradabad, Buin Zahra, a village in Buin Zahra County
- Moradabad, Qazvin, a village in Qazvin County

=== Razavi Khorasan Province ===
- Moradabad, Bakharz, a village in Bakharz County
- Moradabad, Dargaz, a village in Dargaz County

=== Semnan Province ===
- Moradabad, Semnan, a village in Damghan County

=== Tehran Province ===
- Moradabad, Tehran, a village in Tehran County

=== Yazd Province ===
- Moradabad, Yazd, a village in Mehriz County

== See also ==
- Murad (disambiguation)
- Abad (disambiguation)
- Murad Bakhsh, Mughal prince, namesake of the city
