= Nosratabad (disambiguation) =

Nosratabad is a city in Sistan and Baluchestan Province, Iran.

Nosratabad or Nasratabad (Persian: نصرت آباد) may also refer to:

== Alborz Province ==
- Nosratabad, Alborz, a village in Nazarabad County, Alborz Province, Iran

== East Azerbaijan Province ==
- Nosratabad, Malekan, a village in Malekan County
- Nosratabad-e Laklar, a village in Malekan County
- Nosratabad, Tabriz, a village in Tabriz County

== Fars Province ==
- Nosratabad, Fars, a village in Darab County

== Golestan Province ==
- Nosratabad, Aliabad, a village in Aliabad County
- Nosratabad, Aqqala, a village in Aqqala County

== Hamadan Province ==
- Nosratabad, Hamadan, a village in Malayer County
- Nosratabad-e Behraz, a village in Asadabad County
- Nosratabad-e Laklak, a village in Asadabad County

== Kerman Province ==
- Nosratabad, Anar, a village in Anar County
- Nosratabad-e Seh Dangeh, a village in Arzuiyeh County
- Nosratabad, Rabor, a village in Rabor County
- Nosratabad, Estabraq, a village in Shahr-e Babak County
- Nosratabad, Sirjan, a village in Sirjan County

== Kermanshah Province ==
- Nosratabad, Kermanshah, a village in Sonqor County

== Kurdistan Province ==
- Nosratabad, Kamyaran, a village in Kamyaran County
- Nosratabad, Sanandaj, a village in Sanandaj County

== Lorestan Province ==
- Nosratabad, Azna, a village in Azna County
- Nosratabad, Delfan, a village in Delfan County
- Nosratabad-e Olya, a village in Delfan County
- Nosratabad-e Sofla, a village in Delfan County

== Markazi Province ==
- Nosratabad, Mahallat, a village in Mahallat County, Markazi Province, Iran

== Mazandaran Province ==
- Nosratabad, Galugah, a village in Galugah County
- Nosratabad, Nur, a village in Nur County

== Qazvin Province ==
- Nosratabad, Qazvin, a village in Alborz County
- Nosratabad Rural District (Qazvin Province), an administrative subdivision
- Nosratabad, Abgarm, a village in Buin Zahra County
- Nosratabad, Dashtabi, a village in Buin Zahra County
- Nosratabad-e Bayeh, a village in Buin Zahra County

== Razavi Khorasan Province ==
- Nosratabad, Bakharz, a village in Bakharz County
- Nosratabad, Dargaz, a village in Dargaz County
- Nosratabad, alternate name of Nasrabad, Razavi Khorasan, a city in Razavi Khorasan Province, Iran
- Nosratabad, Quchan, a village in Quchan County
- Nosratabad, Torbat-e Heydarieh, a village in Torbat-e Heydarieh County

== Sistan and Baluchestan Province ==
- Nosratabad, a city
- Nosratabad District, an administrative subdivision of Iran

== South Khorasan Province ==
- Nosratabad, Nehbandan, a village in Nehbandan County
- Nosratabad, Tabas, a village in Tabas County

== Tehran Province ==
- Nosratabad, Tehran, a village in Shahriar County

== West Azerbaijan Province ==
- Nosratabad, West Azerbaijan, a village in Poldasht County
- Nosratabad, Takab, a village in Takab County

== Zanjan Province ==
- Nosratabad, Zanjan, a village in Khodabandeh County

== See also ==
- Nosratabad Rural District (disambiguation), administrative subdivisions of Iran
- Nusrat (disambiguation)
