= Nazarabad (disambiguation) =

Nazarabad is a city in Alborz Province, Iran.

Nazarabad may also refer to:

== Azerbaijan ==
- Nəzərabad, a village in Azerbaijan

== Iran ==
=== Alborz Province ===
- Nazarabad, a city in Alborz Province
- Nazarabad, Karaj, a village in Karaj County, Alborz Province
- Nazarabad County, an administrative subdivision of Alborz Province

=== Chaharmahal and Bakhtiari Province ===
- Nazarabad, Chaharmahal and Bakhtiari, a village in Kuhrang County

=== Fars Province ===
- Nazarabad, Jahrom, a village in Jahrom County
- Nazarabad, Sarvestan, a village in Sarvestan County

=== Gilan Province ===
- Nazarabad, Gilan, a village in Astara County

=== Golestan Province ===
- Nazarabad, Golestan, a village in Gorgan County

=== Hormozgan Province ===
- Nazarabad, Hormozgan, a village in Rudan County, Hormozgan Province

=== Isfahan Province ===
- Nazarabad, Isfahan, a village in Semirom County

=== Kerman Province ===
- Nazarabad, Kerman, a village in Narmashir County

=== Kermanshah Province ===
- Nazarabad-e Olya, a village in Kermanshah County

=== Kohgiluyeh and Boyer-Ahmad Province ===
- Nazarabad, Kohgiluyeh and Boyer-Ahmad, a village in Dana County

=== Lorestan Province ===
- Nazarabad, alternate name of Cham Zel-e Shahali, a village in Lorestan Province, Iran
- Nazarabad, Delfan, a village in Lorestan Province, Iran
- Nazarabad, Selseleh, a village in Lorestan Province, Iran

=== Razavi Khorasan Province ===
- Nazarabad, Dargaz, a village in Dargaz County
- Nazarabad, Khoshab, a village in Khoshab County
- Nazarabad, Mashhad, a village in Mashhad County

=== Tehran Province ===
- Nazarabad, Rey, a village in Tehran Province, Iran
- Nazarabad, Varamin, a village in Tehran Province, Iran

=== West Azerbaijan Province ===
- Nazarabad, West Azerbaijan, a village in Salmas County
- Nazarabad-e Eftekhar, a village in Urmia County
- Nazarabad Qaleh, a village in Urmia County
