= Abdolabad-e Kani Kabud =

Village in Lorestan province, Iran

Abdolabad-e Kani Kabud Persian: عبدل ابادكاني كبود
- Village
- Location within Iran
- Coordinates: 34°01′05″N 47°57′47″E
- Country: Iran
- Province: Lorestan
- County: Delfan
- District: Mirbag
- Rural District: Mirbag-e Shomali

Population (2016)
  - Total: 70
- Time zone: UTC+3:30 (IRST)

Abdolabad-e Kani Kabud (Persian: عبدل ابادكاني كبود) (Note: Also romanized as Abdolābād-e Kān Kabūd and ‘Abdolābād-e Kānī Kabūd; also known as Abdolābād) is a village in Mirbag-e Shomali Rural District of Mirbag District in Delfan County, Lorestan province, Iran.

== Demographics ==
=== Population ===
At the time of the 2006 National Census, the village's population was 56 in 11 households, when it was in the Central District. The following census in 2011 counted 64 people in 15 households. The 2016 census measured the population of the village as 70 people in 18 households.

In 2022, the rural district was separated from the district in the formation of Mirbag District.

== Overview ==
Kani Kabud-e Olya, or Abdolabad-e Mirbag, is seven kilometers from the city of Nurabad. It has a very mild climate. Most of the lands in this village are dry. The village has 346 hectares of agricultural land (mainly rainfed), the main crops of which are wheat, peas and barley.

The occupation of the villagers is mainly agriculture and to some extent animal husbandry. The lands known as Darreh-ye Garaki, which have been seized and registered as national lands by the Natural Resources Department of Delfan, belong to this village. Most of the villagers have their own gardens.

In terms of water resources, the village lives in relative poverty. It has a comprehensive health-services center and many springs, the most important of which are Cheshmeh Kamreh, Cheshmeh Pahneh, Kani Sore, or Sorekh, and Dariagho.

A number of villagers have migrated to the cities of Khorramabad and Nurabad. The villagers belong to one of three dynasties: Sheikhian, Abdian and Shahgol. The village has many educated people, some of whom are working as faculty members in the country's universities. Among these people is Dr. Ali Sheikhian, who has a doctorate in immunology and is a member of the Board of Immunology.
