= Shahnabad, Lorestan =

Neighborhood in Lorestan province, Iran

Shahnabad Persian: شهن آباد
- Neighborhood
- Location within Iran
- Coordinates: 33°59′11″N 47°59′23″E
- Country: Iran
- Province: Lorestan
- County: Delfan
- District: Mirbag
- Rural District: Mirbag-e Shomali
- Village: Mirbag

Population (2016)
  - Total: 1,450
- Time zone: UTC+3:30 (IRST)

Shahnabad (Persian: شهن آباد) (Note: Also romanized as Shāhanābād and Shahnābād; also known as Shahīnābād) is a neighborhood in the village of Mirbag in Mirbag-e Shomali Rural District of Mirbag District in Delfan County, Lorestan province, Iran.

== Demographics ==
=== Population ===
At the time of the 2006 National Census, Shahnabad's population was 1,385 in 286 households, when it was a village in Mirbag-e Shomali Rural District of the Central District. The following census in 2011 counted 1,417 people in 343 households. The 2016 census measured the population of the village as 1,450 people in 402 households.

In 2022, the rural district was separated from the district in the formation of Mirbag District, and Shahnabad merged with the village of Farhadabad to form the new village of Mirbag.
