= Baba Jan =

Baba Jan (Persian: باباجان) may refer to:

== People ==
- Baba Jan (politician), a political activist from the Gilgit-Baltistan administrative territory of Pakistan

== Places in Iran ==
- Baba Jan, East Azerbaijan
- Babajan, Lorestan
  - Bābā Jān Tepe, an archaeological site near Babajan
- Baba Jan-e Palizi, Kermanshah Province

== See also ==
- Babajan (disambiguation)
- Baba Jani (disambiguation)
