= Nosratabad, Lorestan =

Nosratabad, Lorestan may refer to:

- Nosratabad, Azna, a village in Azna County, Lorestan Province, Iran
- Nosratabad, Delfan, a village in Delfan County, Lorestan Province, Iran
- Nosratabad-e Olya, a village in Delfan County, Lorestan Province, Iran
- Nosratabad-e Sofla, a village in Delfan County, Lorestan Province, Iran
