= Masumabad, Lorestan =

Village in Lorestan province, Iran

Masumabad Persian: معصوم اباد
- Village
- Location within Iran
- Coordinates: 33°58′09″N 47°59′16″E
- Country: Iran
- Province: Lorestan
- County: Delfan
- District: Mirbag
- Rural District: Mirbag-e Shomali

Population (2016)
  - Total: 624
- Time zone: UTC+3:30 (IRST)

Masumabad (Persian: معصوم اباد) (Note: Also romanized as Ma‘şūmābād) is a village in, and the capital of, Mirbag-e Shomali Rural District in Mirbag District of Delfan County, Lorestan province, Iran. The previous capital of the rural district was the village of Farhadabad, now a neighborhood in the village of Mirbag.

== Demographics ==
=== Population ===
At the time of the 2006 National Census, the village's population was 530 in 107 households, when it was in the Central District. The following census in 2011 counted 589 people in 137 households. The 2016 census measured the population of the village as 624 people in 160 households.

In 2022, the rural district was separated from the district in the formation of Mirbag District.
