= Moradabad, Delfan =

Moradabad, Delfan may refer to:

- Moradabad, Khaveh-ye Jonubi
- Moradabad, Nurabad
- Moradabad-e Gol Gol
- Moradabad-e Mirakhur
- Moradabad-e Pirdusti
- Moradabad Nurali
