= Sohbatabad =

Sohbatabad (Persian: صحبت اباد) may refer to:

- Sohbatabad, Alborz
- Sohbatabad, Kermanshah
- Sohbatabad, Lorestan
