= Fathiabad-e Chaleh Chaleh =

Village in Lorestan province, Iran

Fathiabad-e Chaleh Chaleh Persian: فتحي ابادچاله چاله
- Village
- Location within Iran
- Country: Iran
- Province: Lorestan
- County: Delfan
- District: Mirbag
- Rural District: Mirbag-e Shomali

Population (2016)
  - Total: 0
- Time zone: UTC+3:30 (IRST)

Fathiabad-e Chaleh Chaleh (Persian: فتحي ابادچاله چاله) (Note: Also romanized as Fatḩīābād-e Chāleh Chāleh and Fatḩīābād-e Chā Chāleh) is a village in Mirbag-e Shomali Rural District of Mirbag District in Delfan County, Lorestan province, Iran.

== Demographics ==
=== Population ===
At the time of the 2006 National Census, the village's population was 23 in six households, when it was in the Central District. The following census in 2011 counted 68 people in 18 households. The 2016 census measured the population of the village as zero.

In 2022, the rural district was separated from the district in the formation of Mirbag District.
