= Hajjiabad, Mirbag-e Jonubi =

Village in Lorestan province, Iran

Hajjiabad Persian: حاجي آباد
- Village
- Location within Iran
- Coordinates: 33°58′00″N 47°49′37″E
- Country: Iran
- Province: Lorestan
- County: Delfan
- District: Mirbag
- Rural District: Mirbag-e Jonubi

Population (2016)
  - Total: 49
- Time zone: UTC+3:30 (IRST)

Hajjiabad (Persian: حاجي آباد) (Note: Also romanized as Ḩājjīābād; also known as Ḩājjī Āsgher (حاجي اصغر)) is a village in Mirbag-e Jonubi Rural District of Mirbag District in Delfan County, Lorestan province, Iran.

== Demographics ==
=== Population ===
At the time of the 2006 National Census, the village's population was 77 in 13 households, when it was in the Central District. The following census in 2011 counted 68 people in 12 households. The 2016 census measured the population of the village as 49 people in 10 households.

In 2022, the rural district was separated from the district in the formation of Mirbag District.
