= Hasanabad Bey Baba =

Village in Lorestan province, Iran

Hasanabad Bey Baba Persian: حسن آباد بي بابا
- Village
- Location within Iran
- Coordinates: 33°58′20″N 47°58′09″E
- Country: Iran
- Province: Lorestan
- County: Delfan
- District: Mirbag
- Rural District: Mirbag-e Shomali

Population (2016)
  - Total: 463
- Time zone: UTC+3:30 (IRST)

Hasanabad Bey Baba (Persian: حسن آباد بي بابا) (Note: Also romanized as Ḩasanābād Bey Bābā; also known as Ḩoseynābād, Ḩoseynābād Bey Bābā, and Ḩoseynābād-e Morādābād) is a village in Mirbag-e Shomali Rural District of Mirbag District in Delfan County, Lorestan province, Iran.

== Demographics ==
=== Population ===
At the time of the 2006 National Census, the village's population was 511 in 107 households, when it was in the Central District. The following census in 2011 counted 533 people in 135 households. The 2016 census measured the population of the village as 463 people in 143 households.

In 2022, the rural district was separated from the district in the formation of Mirbag District.
