= Dul Bid =

Village in Lorestan province, Iran

Dul Bid Persian: دول بيد
- Village
- Location within Iran
- Coordinates: 33°54′57″N 47°50′59″E
- Country: Iran
- Province: Lorestan
- County: Delfan
- District: Mirbag
- Rural District: Mirbag-e Jonubi

Population (2016)
  - Total: 47
- Time zone: UTC+3:30 (IRST)

Dul Bid (Persian: دول بيد) (Note: Also romanized as Dūl Bīd and Dūlbīd; also known as Dūl Bīd-e Vosţá) is a village in Mirbag-e Jonubi Rural District of Mirbag District in Delfan County, Lorestan province, Iran.

== Demographics ==
=== Population ===
At the time of the 2006 National Census, the village's population was 64 in 12 households, when it was in the Central District. The following census in 2011 counted 53 people in 11 households. The 2016 census measured the population of the village as 47 people in 13 households.

In 2022, the rural district was separated from the district in the formation of Mirbag District.
