= Cheshmeh Kabud, Mirbag =

Village in Lorestan province, Iran

Cheshmeh Kabud Persian: شهبازبگ
- Village
- Location within Iran
- Coordinates: 33°59′52″N 47°58′03″E
- Country: Iran
- Province: Lorestan
- County: Delfan
- District: Mirbag
- Rural District: Mirbag-e Shomali

Population (2016)
  - Total: 146
- Time zone: UTC+3:30 (IRST)

Cheshmeh Kabud (Persian: چشمه کبود) (Note: Also romanized as Cheshmeh Kabūd; also known as Sarcheshmeh-ye Kabūd) is a village in Mirbag-e Shomali Rural District of Mirbag District in Delfan County, Lorestan province, Iran.

== Demographics ==
=== Population ===
At the time of the 2006 National Census, the village's population was 98 in 21 households, when it was in the Central District. The following census in 2011 counted 115 people in 30 households. The 2016 census measured the population of the village as 146 people in 45 households.

In 2022, the rural district was separated from the district in the formation of Mirbag District.
