= Kul Marz =

Kul Marz (Persian: كول مرز) may refer to:

- Kul Marz Olya
- Kul Marz Sofla
