= Div Saffan =

Div Saffan (Persian: دیوسفّان) may refer to:

- Div Saffan-e Olya
- Div Saffan-e Sofla
