= Karimabad, Delfan =

Village in Lorestan province, Iran

Karimabad Persian: کريم آباد
- Village
- Location within Iran
- Coordinates: 33°55′22″N 47°45′28″E
- Country: Iran
- Province: Lorestan
- County: Delfan
- District: Mirbag
- Rural District: Mirbag-e Jonubi

Population (2016)
  - Total: 26
- Time zone: UTC+3:30 (IRST)

Karimabad (Persian: کريم آباد) (Note: Also romanized as Karīmābād) is a village in Mirbag-e Jonubi Rural District of Mirbag District in Delfan County, Lorestan province, Iran.

== Demographics ==
=== Population ===
At the time of the 2006 National Census, the village's population was 51 in 11 households, when it was in the Central District. The following census in 2011 counted 35 people in 10 households. The 2016 census measured the population of the village as 26 people in seven households.

In 2022, the rural district was separated from the district in the formation of Mirbag District.
