= Hatamabad, Delfan =

Village in Lorestan province, Iran

Hatamabad Persian: حاتم آباد
- Village
- Location within Iran
- Coordinates: 33°59′49″N 47°56′39″E
- Country: Iran
- Province: Lorestan
- County: Delfan
- District: Mirbag
- Rural District: Mirbag-e Shomali

Population (2016)
  - Total: 73
- Time zone: UTC+3:30 (IRST)

Hatamabad (Persian: حاتم آباد) (Note: Also romanized as Ḩātamābād; also known as Ḩātamābād-e Gol Gol) is a village in Mirbag-e Shomali Rural District of Mirbag District in Delfan County, Lorestan province, Iran.

== Demographics ==
=== Population ===
At the time of the 2006 National Census, the village's population was 81 in 14 households, when it was in the Central District. The following census in 2011 counted 67 people in 14 households. The 2016 census measured the population of the village as 73 people in 18 households.

In 2022, the rural district was separated from the district in the formation of Mirbag District.
