= Anbarteh-ye Pain =

Village in Lorestan province, Iran

Anbarteh-ye Pain Persian: انبارته پايين
- Village
- Location within Iran
- Country: Iran
- Province: Lorestan
- County: Delfan
- District: Mirbag
- Rural District: Mirbag-e Jonubi

Population (2016)
  - Total: 0
- Time zone: UTC+3:30 (IRST)

Anbarteh-ye Pain (Persian: انبارته پايين) (Note: Also romanized as Anbārteh-ye Pā’īn; formerly known as Anbarteh-ye Sofla (انبارته سفلي), also romanized as Anbārteh-e Soflá and Anbārteh-ye Soflá; also known as Amārateh-ye Soflá and Anbārteh) is a village in Mirbag-e Jonubi Rural District of Mirbag District in Delfan County, Lorestan province, Iran.

== Demographics ==
=== Population ===
At the time of the 2006 National Census, the village's population, as Anbarteh-ye Sofla, was 43 in six households, when it was in the Central District. The 2016 census measured the population of the village as zero, by which time the village was listed as Anbarteh-ye Pain.

In 2022, the rural district was separated from the district in the formation of Mirbag District.
