= Fazelabad, Lorestan =

Village in Lorestan province, Iran

Fazelabad Persian: فاضل اباد
- Village
- Location within Iran
- Coordinates: 33°51′33″N 47°54′50″E
- Country: Iran
- Province: Lorestan
- County: Delfan
- District: Mirbag
- Rural District: Mirbag-e Jonubi

Population (2016)
  - Total: 296
- Time zone: UTC+3:30 (IRST)

Fazelabad (Persian: فاضل اباد) (Note: Also romanized as Fāẕelābād) is a village in Mirbag-e Jonubi Rural District of Mirbag District in Delfan County, Lorestan province, Iran.

== Demographics ==
=== Population ===
At the time of the 2006 National Census, the village's population was 273 in 60 households, when it was in the Central District. The following census in 2011 counted 309 people in 70 households. The 2016 census measured the population of the village as 296 people in 81 households.

In 2022, the rural district was separated from the district in the formation of Mirbag District.
