= Khodaverdi =

Village in Lorestan province, Iran

Khodaverdi Persian: خداوردي
- Village
- Country: Iran
- Province: Lorestan
- County: Delfan
- District: Mirbag
- Rural District: Mirbag-e Jonubi

Population (2016)
  - Total: 22
- Time zone: UTC+3:30 (IRST)

Khodaverdi (Persian: خداوردي) (Note: Also romanized as Khoda Vardi, Khodā Vardī, and Khodāverdī) is a village in Mirbag-e Jonubi Rural District of Mirbag District in Delfan County, Lorestan province, Iran.

== Demographics ==
=== Population ===
At the time of the 2006 National Census, the village's population was 25 in four households, when it was in the Central District. The following census in 2011 counted a population below the reporting threshold. The 2016 census measured the population of the village as 22 people in five households.

In 2022, the rural district was separated from the district in the formation of Mirbag District.
