= Dam Bagh Yusefabad =

Village in Lorestan province, Iran

Dam Bagh Yusefabad Persian: دم باغ يوسف آباد
- Village
- Location within Iran
- Coordinates: 33°54′28″N 47°56′12″E
- Country: Iran
- Province: Lorestan
- County: Delfan
- District: Mirbag
- Rural District: Mirbag-e Jonubi

Population (2016)
  - Total: 602
- Time zone: UTC+3:30 (IRST)

Dam Bagh Yusefabad (Persian: دم باغ يوسف آباد) (Note: Also romanized as Dam Bāgh Yūsefābād; also known as Dam Bāgh, Dambākh, Dom Bāgh, Dom Bākh-e Vasaţ, and Dūmbākh) is a village in, and the capital of, Mirbag-e Jonubi Rural District in Mirbag District of Delfan County, Lorestan province, Iran.

== Demographics ==
=== Population ===
At the time of the 2006 National Census, the village's population was 703 in 157 households, when it was in the Central District. The following census in 2011 counted 736 people in 186 households. The 2016 census measured the population of the village as 602 people in 164 households.

In 2022, the rural district was separated from the district in the formation of Mirbag District.
