= Sar Marang =

Village in Lorestan province, Iran

Sar Marang Persian: سرمرنگ
- Village
- Location within Iran
- Coordinates: 33°51′32″N 47°47′27″E
- Country: Iran
- Province: Lorestan
- County: Delfan
- District: Mirbag
- Rural District: Mirbag-e Jonubi

Population (2016)
  - Total: 166
- Time zone: UTC+3:30 (IRST)

Sar Marang (Persian: سرمرنگ) (Note: Also romanized as Sar Marang and Sarmarang) is a village in Mirbag-e Jonubi Rural District of Mirbag District in Delfan County, Lorestan province, Iran.

== Demographics ==
=== Population ===
At the time of the 2006 National Census, the village's population was 202 in 46 households, when it was in the Central District. The following census in 2011 counted 192 people in 46 households. The 2016 census measured the population of the village as 166 people in 45 households.

In 2022, the rural district was separated from the district in the formation of Mirbag District.
