= Sheykhabad Sheykheh =

Village in Lorestan province, Iran

Sheykhabad Sheykheh Persian: شيخ آباد شيخه
- Village
- Location within Iran
- Coordinates: 33°58′45″N 48°01′42″E
- Country: Iran
- Province: Lorestan
- County: Delfan
- District: Mirbag
- Rural District: Mirbag-e Shomali

Population (2016)
  - Total: 287
- Time zone: UTC+3:30 (IRST)

Sheykhabad Sheykheh (Persian: شيخ آباد شيخه) (Note: Also romanized as Sheykhābād Sheykheh; also known as Sheykhābād and Sheykheh) is a village in Mirbag-e Shomali Rural District of Mirbag District in Delfan County, Lorestan province, Iran.

== Demographics ==
=== Population ===
At the time of the 2006 National Census, the village's population was 369 in 80 households, when it was in the Central District. The following census in 2011 counted 332 people in 86 households. The 2016 census measured the population of the village as 287 people in 82 households.

In 2022, the rural district was separated from the district in the formation of Mirbag District.
