= Gowhar Gush =

Village in Lorestan province, Iran

Gowhar Gush Persian: گوهرگوش
- Village
- Location within Iran
- Coordinates: 33°58′11″N 47°55′49″E
- Country: Iran
- Province: Lorestan
- County: Delfan
- District: Mirbag
- Rural District: Mirbag-e Shomali

Population (2016)
  - Total: 107
- Time zone: UTC+3:30 (IRST)

Gowhar Gush (Persian: گوهرگوش) (Note: Also romanized as Gowhar Gūsh; also known as Gowhar Gūsh-e Kāz̧emābād) is a village in Mirbag-e Shomali Rural District of Mirbag District in Delfan County, Lorestan province, Iran.

== Demographics ==
=== Population ===
At the time of the 2006 National Census, the village's population was 149 in 25 households, when it was in the Central District. The following census in 2011 counted 131 people in 34 households. The 2016 census measured the population of the village as 107 people in 33 households.

In 2022, the rural district was separated from the district in the formation of Mirbag District.
