= Kazemabad, Mirbag-e Shomali =

Village in Lorestan province, Iran

Kazemabad Persian: كاظم اباد
- Village
- Location within Iran
- Coordinates: 33°58′32″N 47°55′36″E
- Country: Iran
- Province: Lorestan
- County: Delfan
- District: Mirbag
- Rural District: Mirbag-e Shomali

Population (2016)
  - Total: 38
- Time zone: UTC+3:30 (IRST)

Kazemabad (Persian: كاظم اباد) (Note: Also romanized as Kāz̧emābād) is a village in Mirbag-e Shomali Rural District of Mirbag District in Delfan County, Lorestan province, Iran.

== Demographics ==
=== Population ===
At the time of the 2006 National Census, the village's population was 50 in 10 households, when it was in the Central District. The following census in 2011 counted 43 people in nine households. The 2016 census measured the population of the village as 38 people in 10 households.

In 2022, the rural district was separated from the district in the formation of Mirbag District.
