= Deh Yusefan =

Deh Yusefan (Persian: ده يوسفان) may refer to:

- Deh Yusefan-e Olya
- Deh Yusefan-e Sofla
