= Abbasabad, Delfan =

Village in Lorestan province, Iran

Abbasabad Persian: عباس اباد
- Village
- Location within Iran
- Country: Iran
- Province: Lorestan
- County: Delfan
- District: Mirbag
- Rural District: Mirbag-e Jonubi

Population (2016)
  - Total: 37
- Time zone: UTC+3:30 (IRST)

Abbasabad (Persian: عباس اباد) (Note: Also romanized as ‘Abbāsābād) is a village in Mirbag-e Jonubi Rural District of Mirbag District in Delfan County, Lorestan province, Iran.

== Demographics ==
=== Population ===
At the time of the 2006 National Census, the village's population was 30 in six households, when it was in the Central District. The following census in 2011 counted 40 people in eight households. The 2016 census measured the population of the village as 37 people in 10 households.

In 2022, the rural district was separated from the district in the formation of Mirbag District.
