= Fattahabad =

Fattahabad or Fatahabad (Persian: فتاح اباد) may refer to:

- Fattahabad, Kurdistan
- Fattahabad, Lorestan
