= Yusefabad Cham Chal =

Village in Lorestan province, Iran

Yusefabad Cham Chal Persian: يوسف ابادچم چال
- Village
- Location within Iran
- Country: Iran
- Province: Lorestan
- County: Delfan
- District: Mirbag
- Rural District: Mirbag-e Jonubi

Population (2016)
  - Total: 100
- Time zone: UTC+3:30 (IRST)

Yusefabad Cham Chal (Persian: يوسف ابادچم چال) (Note: Also romanized as Yūsefābād Cham Chāl; also known as Yūsefābād) is a village in Mirbag-e Jonubi Rural District of Mirbag District in Delfan County, Lorestan province, Iran.

== Demographics ==
=== Population ===
At the time of the 2006 National Census, the village's population was 128 in 27 households, when it was in the Central District. The following census in 2011 counted 143 people in 36 households. The 2016 census measured the population of the village as 100 people in 34 households.

In 2022, the rural district was separated from the district in the formation of Mirbag District.
