= Kazemi, Iran =

Village in Lorestan province, Iran

Kazemi Persian: کاظمي
- Village
- Location within Iran
- Coordinates: 33°57′18″N 47°50′05″E
- Country: Iran
- Province: Lorestan
- County: Delfan
- District: Mirbag
- Rural District: Mirbag-e Jonubi

Population (2016)
  - Total: 123
- Time zone: UTC+3:30 (IRST)

Kazemi (Persian: کاظمي) (Note: Also romanized as Kāz̧emī; also known as Kāẓemābād (کاظم آباد) and Tīzāb-e Kāz̧emī) is a village in Mirbag-e Jonubi Rural District of Mirbag District in Delfan County, Lorestan province, Iran.

== Demographics ==
=== Population ===
At the time of the 2006 National Census, the village's population was 127 in 26 households, when it was in the Central District. The following census in 2011 counted 140 people in 29 households. The 2016 census measured the population of the village as 123 people in 34 households.

In 2022, the rural district was separated from the district in the formation of Mirbag District.
