= Zaliabad =

Village in Lorestan province, Iran

Zaliabad Persian: زالي آباد
- Village
- Location within Iran
- Coordinates: 34°00′35″N 48°01′45″E
- Country: Iran
- Province: Lorestan
- County: Delfan
- District: Mirbag
- Rural District: Mirbag-e Shomali

Population (2016)
  - Total: 822
- Time zone: UTC+3:30 (IRST)

Zaliabad (Persian: زالي آباد) (Note: Also romanized as Zālīābād) is a village in Mirbag-e Shomali Rural District of Mirbag District in Delfan County, Lorestan province, Iran, serving as capital of the district.

== Demographics ==
=== Population ===
At the time of the 2006 National Census, the village's population was 671 in 162 households, when it was in the Central District. The following census in 2011 counted 842 people in 220 households. The 2016 census measured the population of the village as 822 people in 216 households.

In 2022, the rural district was separated from the district in the formation of Mirbag District.
