= Rezaabad-e Reza Veys =

Village in Lorestan province, Iran

Rezaabad-e Reza Veys Persian: رضاابادرضاويس
- Village
- Location within Iran
- Coordinates: 33°51′56″N 47°51′46″E
- Country: Iran
- Province: Lorestan
- County: Delfan
- District: Mirbag
- Rural District: Mirbag-e Jonubi

Population (2016)
  - Total: 189
- Time zone: UTC+3:30 (IRST)

Rezaabad-e Reza Veys (Persian: رضاابادرضاويس) (Note: Also romanized as Reẕāābād-e Reẕā Veys; also known as Reẕā Veys) is a village in Mirbag-e Jonubi Rural District of Mirbag District in Delfan County, Lorestan province, Iran.

== Demographics ==
=== Population ===
At the time of the 2006 National Census, the village's population was 180 in 39 households, when it was in the Central District. The following census in 2011 counted 175 people in 40 households. The 2016 census measured the population of the village as 189 people in 56 households.

In 2022, the rural district was separated from the district in the formation of Mirbag District.
