= Nematabad, Lorestan =

Village in Lorestan province, Iran

Nematabad Persian: يوسف آباد عبدالمني
- Village
- Location within Iran
- Coordinates: 33°54′41″N 47°54′21″E
- Country: Iran
- Province: Lorestan
- County: Delfan
- District: Mirbag
- Rural District: Mirbag-e Jonubi

Population (2016)
  - Total: 76
- Time zone: UTC+3:30 (IRST)

Nematabad (Persian: نعمت اباد) (Note: Also romanized as Ne‘matābād) is a village in Mirbag-e Jonubi Rural District of Mirbag District in Delfan County, Lorestan province, Iran.

== Demographics ==
=== Population ===
At the time of the 2006 National Census, the village's population was 187 in 38 households, when it was in the Central District. The following census in 2011 counted 188 people in 39 households. The 2016 census measured the population of the village as 115 people in 40 households.

In 2022, the rural district was separated from the district in the formation of Mirbag District.
