= Meleh Khan =

Village in Lorestan province, Iran

Meleh Khan Persian: مله خان
- Village
- Location within Iran
- Coordinates: 33°55′05″N 47°54′12″E
- Country: Iran
- Province: Lorestan
- County: Delfan
- District: Mirbag
- Rural District: Mirbag-e Jonubi

Population (2016)
  - Total: 870
- Time zone: UTC+3:30 (IRST)

Meleh Khan (Persian: مله خان) (Note: Also romanized as Meleh Khān; also known as Mīleh Khān and Milleh Khān) is a village in Mirbag-e Jonubi Rural District of Mirbag District in Delfan County, Lorestan province, Iran.

== Demographics ==
=== Population ===
At the time of the 2006 National Census, the village's population was 794 in 181 households, when it was in the Central District. The following census in 2011 counted 861 people in 218 households. The 2016 census measured the population of the village as 870 people in 248 households, the most populous in its rural district.

In 2022, the rural district was separated from the district in the formation of Mirbag District.
