= Mirzaabad, Lorestan =

Village in Lorestan province, Iran

Mirzaabad Persian: ميرزااباد
- Village
- Location within Iran
- Coordinates: 33°56′04″N 47°58′10″E
- Country: Iran
- Province: Lorestan
- County: Delfan
- District: Mirbag
- Rural District: Mirbag-e Jonubi

Population (2016)
  - Total: 851
- Time zone: UTC+3:30 (IRST)

Mirzaabad (Persian: ميرزااباد) (Note: Also romanized as Mīrzāābād; also known as Mīrzāābād-e ‘Olyā) is a village in Mirbag-e Jonubi Rural District of Mirbag District in Delfan County, Lorestan province, Iran.

== Demographics ==
=== Population ===
At the time of the 2006 National Census, the village's population was 836 in 172 households, when it was in the Central District. The following census in 2011 counted 882 people in 203 households. The 2016 census measured the population of the village as 851 people in 256 households.

In 2022, the rural district was separated from the district in the formation of Mirbag District.
