= Shah Qoli =

Shah Qoli (Persian: شاه قلي) may refer to:

- Shah Qoli, Lorestan, Iran
- Shah Qoliabad, Lorestan Province, Iran
