= Sabzeh Khani =

Sabzeh Khani سبزه خاني
- Village
- Location within Iran
- Coordinates: 34°00′37″N 47°52′25″E
- Country: Iran
- Province: Lorestan
- County: Delfan
- Bakhsh: Central
- Rural District: Nurabad

Population (2006)
  - Total: 285
- Time zone: UTC+3:30 (IRST)
  - Summer (DST): UTC+4:30 (IRDT)

Sabzeh Khani (Persian: سبزه خاني, also Romanized as Sabzeh Khānī; also known as Sabz-e Khānī and Sabzeh Khānī-e Soflá) is a village in Nurabad Rural District, in the Central District of Delfan County, Lorestan Province, Iran. At the 2006 census, its population was 285, in 54 families.
