= Farhadabad, Delfan =

Neighborhood in Lorestan province, Iran

Farhadabad Persian: فرهاداباد
- Neighborhood
- Location within Iran
- Coordinates: 33°59′21″N 47°59′42″E
- Country: Iran
- Province: Lorestan
- County: Delfan
- District: Mirbag
- Rural District: Mirbag-e Shomali
- Village: Mirbag

Population (2016)
  - Total: 1,635
- Time zone: UTC+3:30 (IRST)

Farhadabad (Persian: فرهاداباد) (Note: Also romanized as Farhādābād) is a neighborhood in the village of Mirbag in Mirbag-e Shomali Rural District of Mirbag District in Delfan County, Lorestan province, Iran. As a village, it was the capital of the rural district until its capital was transferred to the village of Masumabad.

== Demographics ==
=== Population ===
At the time of the 2006 National Census, Farhadabad's population was 1,568 in 321 households, when it was a village in Mirbag-e Shomali Rural District of the Central District. The following census in 2011 counted 1,648 people in 359 households. The 2016 census measured the population of the village as 1,635 people in 393 households, the most populous in its rural district.

In 2022, the rural district was separated from the district in the formation of Mirbag District, and Farhadabad merged with the village of Shahnabad to form the new village of Mirbag.
