= Yar Hoseynabad =

Village in Lorestan province, Iran

Yar Hoseynabad Persian: يارحسين اباد
- Village
- Location within Iran
- Coordinates: 34°00′59″N 47°58′36″E
- Country: Iran
- Province: Lorestan
- County: Delfan
- District: Mirbag
- Rural District: Mirbag-e Shomali

Population (2016)
  - Total: 109
- Time zone: UTC+3:30 (IRST)

Yar Hoseynabad (Persian: يارحسين اباد) (Note: Also romanized as Yār Ḩoseynābād; also known as Yār Ḩasanābād) is a village in Mirbag-e Shomali Rural District of Mirbag District in Delfan County, Lorestan province, Iran.

== Demographics ==
=== Population ===
At the time of the 2006 National Census, the village's population was 137 in 32 households, when it was in the Central District. The following census in 2011 counted 135 people in 37 households. The 2016 census measured the population of the village as 109 people in 27 households.

In 2022, the rural district was separated from the district in the formation of Mirbag District.
