= Cheraghabad, Lorestan =

Village in Lorestan province, Iran

Cheraghabad Persian: چراغ اباد
- Village
- Location within Iran
- Coordinates: 33°56′22″N 47°57′52″E
- Country: Iran
- Province: Lorestan
- County: Delfan
- District: Mirbag
- Rural District: Mirbag-e Jonubi

Population (2016)
  - Total: 196
- Time zone: UTC+3:30 (IRST)

Cheraghabad (Persian: چراغ اباد) (Note: Also romanized as Cherāghābād) is a village in Mirbag-e Jonubi Rural District of Mirbag District in Delfan County, Lorestan province, Iran.

== Demographics ==
=== Population ===
At the time of the 2006 National Census, the village's population was 328 in 75 households, when it was in the Central District. The following census in 2011 counted 289 people in 80 households. The 2016 census measured the population of the village as 196 people in 65 households.

In 2022, the rural district was separated from the district in the formation of Mirbag District.
