= Karamabad, Mirbag-e Shomali =

Village in Lorestan province, Iran

Karamabad Persian: کرم آباد
- Village
- Location within Iran
- Country: Iran
- Province: Lorestan
- County: Delfan
- District: Mirbag
- Rural District: Mirbag-e Shomali

Population (2016)
  - Total: 81
- Time zone: UTC+3:30 (IRST)

Karamabad (Persian: کرم آباد) (Note: Also romanized as Karamābād; also known as Karamābād-e Dargāvand) is a village in Mirbag-e Shomali Rural District of Mirbag District in Delfan County, Lorestan province, Iran.

== Demographics ==
=== Population ===
At the time of the 2006 National Census, the village's population was 36 in eight households, when it was in the Central District. The following census in 2011 counted 38 people in 10 households. The 2016 census measured the population of the village as 81 people in 21 households.

In 2022, the rural district was separated from the district in the formation of Mirbag District.
