= Asadabad-e Chenar =

Village in Lorestan province, Iran

Asadabad-e Chenar Persian: اسدآباد چنار
- Village
- Location within Iran
- Coordinates: 33°57′42″N 48°00′14″E
- Country: Iran
- Province: Lorestan
- County: Delfan
- District: Mirbag
- Rural District: Mirbag-e Shomali

Population (2016)
  - Total: 109
- Time zone: UTC+3:30 (IRST)

Asadabad-e Chenar (Persian: اسدآباد چنار) (Note: Also romanized as Asadābād-e Chenār) is a village in Mirbag-e Shomali Rural District of Mirbag District in Delfan County, Lorestan province, Iran.

== Demographics ==
=== Population ===
At the time of the 2006 National Census, the village's population was 116 in 20 households, when it was in the Central District. The following census in 2011 counted 114 people in 29 households. The 2016 census measured the population of the village as 109 people in 30 households.

In 2022, the rural district was separated from the district in the formation of Mirbag District.
