= Shahrak-e Emam Khomeyni, Delfan =

Village in Lorestan province, Iran

Shahrak-e Emam Khomeyni Persian: شهرک امام خميني
- Village
- Location within Iran
- Coordinates: 33°55′51″N 48°01′28″E
- Country: Iran
- Province: Lorestan
- County: Delfan
- District: Mirbag
- Rural District: Mirbag-e Shomali

Population (2016)
  - Total: 1,276
- Time zone: UTC+3:30 (IRST)

Shahrak-e Emam Khomeyni (Persian: شهرک امام خميني) (Note: Also romanized as Shahrak-e Emām Khomeynī; also known as Shahrak-e ‘Alīābād (شهرک علي آباد)) is a village in Mirbag-e Shomali Rural District of Mirbag District in Delfan County, Lorestan province, Iran.

== Demographics ==
=== Population ===
At the time of the 2006 National Census, the village's population was 1,409 in 335 households, when it was in the Central District. The following census in 2011 counted 1,697 people in 445 households. The 2016 census measured the population of the village as 1,276 people in 379 households.

In 2022, the rural district was separated from the district in the formation of Mirbag District.
