= Hajji Morad =

Hajji Morad (Persian: حاجي مراد) may refer to:

- Hajji Morad, Delfan, Lorestan Province
- Hajji Morad, Kuhdasht, Lorestan Province
- Hajji Morad, Yazd
