= Sohrababad =

Sohrababad (Persian: سهراب آباد) may refer to:

- Sohrababad, Ardabil
- Sohrababad, Lorestan
- Sohrababad, Sistan and Baluchestan
