= Gajineh =

Gajineh (Persian: گَجينِه) may refer to:

- Ganjineh-ye Zaruni
- Sarab-e Ahmadvand
