= Nowruzabad, Mirbag-e Shomali =

Village in Lorestan province, Iran

Nowruzabad Persian: نوروزاباد
- Village
- Location within Iran
- Coordinates: 33°53′48″N 47°59′19″E
- Country: Iran
- Province: Lorestan
- County: Delfan
- District: Mirbag
- Rural District: Mirbag-e Shomali

Population (2016)
  - Total: 36
- Time zone: UTC+3:30 (IRST)

Nowruzabad (Persian: نوروزاباد) (Note: Also romanized as Nowrūzābād; also known as Nowrūzābād-e Tatar) is a village in Mirbag-e Shomali Rural District of Mirbag District in Delfan County, Lorestan province, Iran.

== Demographics ==
=== Population ===
At the time of the 2006 National Census, the village's population was 35 in seven households, when it was in the Central District. The following census in 2011 counted 72 people in 19 households. The 2016 census measured the population of the village as 36 people in nine households.

In 2022, the rural district was separated from the district in the formation of Mirbag District.
