= Mirali, Iran =

Village in Lorestan province, Iran

Mirali Persian: ميرعلي
- Village
- Location within Iran
- Coordinates: 33°53′59″N 47°53′17″E
- Country: Iran
- Province: Lorestan
- County: Delfan
- District: Mirbag
- Rural District: Mirbag-e Jonubi

Population (2016)
  - Total: 135
- Time zone: UTC+3:30 (IRST)

Mirali (Persian: ميرعلي) (Note: Also romanized as Mīr‘alī; also known as Tītān Sar (تيتان سر)) is a village in Mirbag-e Jonubi Rural District of Mirbag District in Delfan County, Lorestan province, Iran.

== Demographics ==
=== Population ===
At the time of the 2006 National Census, the village's population was 206 in 50 households, when it was in the Central District. The following census in 2011 counted 182 people in 41 households. The 2016 census measured the population of the village as 135 people in 39 households.

In 2022, the rural district was separated from the district in the formation of Mirbag District.
