= Yarabad Mirbeyg =

Village in Lorestan province, Iran

Yarabad Mirbeyg Persian: يارابادميربيگ
- Village
- Location within Iran
- Coordinates: 33°53′46″N 48°01′01″E
- Country: Iran
- Province: Lorestan
- County: Delfan
- District: Mirbag
- Rural District: Mirbag-e Shomali

Population (2016)
  - Total: 1,211
- Time zone: UTC+3:30 (IRST)

Yarabad Mirbeyg (Persian: يارابادميربيگ) (Note: Also romanized as Yārābād Mīrbeyg; also known as Yārābād) is a village in Mirbag-e Shomali Rural District of Mirbag District in Delfan County, Lorestan province, Iran.

== Demographics ==
=== Population ===
At the time of the 2006 National Census, the village's population was 1,491 in 309 households, when it was in the Central District. The following census in 2011 counted 1,466 people in 333 households. The 2016 census measured the population of the village as 1,211 people in 327 households.

In 2022, the rural district was separated from the district in the formation of Mirbag District.
