= Chal Seyl =

Chal Seyl چال سيل
- Village
- Location within Iran
- Coordinates: 33°59′37″N 47°52′40″E
- Country: Iran
- Province: Lorestan
- County: Delfan
- Bakhsh: Central
- Rural District: Nurabad

Population (2006)
  - Total: 84
- Time zone: UTC+3:30 (IRST)
  - Summer (DST): UTC+4:30 (IRDT)

Chal Seyl (Persian: چال سيل, also Romanized as Chāl Seyl; also known as Chāl Seyl-e Cherāghābād and Chāl Seyl-e ‘Olyā) is a village in Nurabad Rural District, in the Central District of Delfan County, Lorestan Province, Iran. At the 2006 census, its population was 84, in 14 families.
