= Jafarabad-e Bala, Lorestan =

Village in Lorestan province, Iran

Jafarabad-e Bala Persian: جعفرآباد بالا
- Village
- Location within Iran
- Coordinates: 33°58′09″N 48°00′09″E
- Country: Iran
- Province: Lorestan
- County: Delfan
- District: Mirbag
- Rural District: Mirbag-e Shomali

Population (2016)
  - Total: 206
- Time zone: UTC+3:30 (IRST)

Jafarabad-e Bala (Persian: جعفرآباد بالا) (Note: Also romanized as Ja‘farābād-e Bālā; formerly known as Jafarabad-e Olya (جعفرآباد عليا), also romanized as Ja‘farābād-e ‘Olyā) is a village in Mirbag-e Shomali Rural District of Mirbag District in Delfan County, Lorestan province, Iran.

== Demographics ==
=== Population ===
At the time of the 2006 National Census, the village's population, as Jafarabad-e Olya, was 232 in 49 households, when it was in the Central District. The following census in 2011 counted 234 people in 56 households, by which time the village was listed as Jafarabad-e Bala. The 2016 census measured the population of the village as 206 people in 57 households.

In 2022, the rural district was separated from the district in the formation of Mirbag District.
