= Azizabad, Delfan (disambiguation) =

There are six places called Azizabad in Delfan County:

- Azizabad, Delfan
- Azizabad, Kakavand
- Azizabad, alternate name of Aziz Koshteh
- Azizabad, alternate name of Mohammad Shahabad
- Azizabad-e Pain
