= Varmeleh =

Village in Lorestan province, Iran

Varmeleh Persian: ورمله
- Village
- Location within Iran
- Coordinates: 33°57′36″N 47°54′47″E
- Country: Iran
- Province: Lorestan
- County: Delfan
- District: Mirbag
- Rural District: Mirbag-e Shomali

Population (2016)
  - Total: 117
- Time zone: UTC+3:30 (IRST)

Varmeleh (Persian: ورمله) (Note: Also known as Moḥammad Morād (محمدمراد)) is a village in Mirbag-e Shomali Rural District of Mirbag District in Delfan County, Lorestan province, Iran.

== Demographics ==
=== Population ===
At the time of the 2006 National Census, the village's population was 136 in 25 households, when it was in the Central District. The following census in 2011 counted 151 people in 32 households. The 2016 census measured the population of the village as 117 people in 38 households.

In 2022, the rural district was separated from the district in the formation of Mirbag District.
