= Kan Khan =

Kan Khan (Persian: كن خان) may refer to:

- Kan Khan-e Masumeh
- Kan Khan-e Yaqub
