= Dimandul =

Village in Lorestan province, Iran

Dimandul Persian: ديماندول
- Village
- Location within Iran
- Coordinates: 33°59′01″N 47°54′54″E
- Country: Iran
- Province: Lorestan
- County: Delfan
- District: Mirbag
- Rural District: Mirbag-e Shomali

Population (2016)
  - Total: 330
- Time zone: UTC+3:30 (IRST)

Dimandul (Persian: ديماندول) (Note: Also romanized as Dīmāndūl) is a village in Mirbag-e Shomali Rural District of Mirbag District in Delfan County, Lorestan province, Iran.

== Demographics ==
=== Population ===
At the time of the 2006 National Census, the village's population was 405 in 90 households, when it was in the Central District. The following census in 2011 counted 374 people in 89 households. The 2016 census measured the population of the village as 330 people in 87 households.

In 2022, the rural district was separated from the district in the formation of Mirbag District.
