= Ahmadvand, Lorestan =

Village in Lorestan province, Iran

Ahmadvand Persian: احمدوند
- Village
- Location within Iran
- Coordinates: 33°58′14″N 48°01′18″E
- Country: Iran
- Province: Lorestan
- County: Delfan
- District: Mirbag
- Rural District: Mirbag-e Shomali

Population (2016)
  - Total: 97
- Time zone: UTC+3:30 (IRST)

Ahmadvand (Persian: احمدوند) (Note: Also romanized as Aḩmadvand) is a village in Mirbag-e Shomali Rural District of Mirbag District in Delfan County, Lorestan province, Iran.

== Demographics ==
=== Population ===
At the time of the 2006 National Census, the village's population was 103 in 20 households, when it was in the Central District. The following census in 2011 counted 128 people in 28 households. The 2016 census measured the population of the village as 97 people in 23 households.

In 2022, the rural district was separated from the district in the formation of Mirbag District.
