= Aliabad, Mirbag-e Jonubi =

Village in Lorestan province, Iran

Aliabad Persian: علي اباد
- Village
- Country: Iran
- Province: Lorestan
- County: Delfan
- District: Mirbag
- Rural District: Mirbag-e Jonubi

Population (2016)
  - Total: 102
- Time zone: UTC+3:30 (IRST)

Aliabad (Persian: علي اباد) (Note: Also romanized as ‘Alīābād) is a village in Mirbag-e Jonubi Rural District of Mirbag District in Delfan County, Lorestan province, Iran.

== Demographics ==
=== Population ===
At the time of the 2006 National Census, the village's population was 102 in 16 households, when it was in the Central District. The following census in 2011 counted 72 people in 15 households. The 2016 census measured the population of the village as 102 people in 24 households.

In 2022, the rural district was separated from the district in the formation of Mirbag District.
