= Gur Mohammad =

Village in Lorestan province, Iran

Gur Mohammad Persian: گورمحمد
- Village
- Location within Iran
- Coordinates: 33°55′34″N 47°51′58″E
- Country: Iran
- Province: Lorestan
- County: Delfan
- District: Mirbag
- Rural District: Mirbag-e Jonubi

Population (2016)
  - Total: 122
- Time zone: UTC+3:30 (IRST)

Gur Mohammad (Persian: گورمحمد) (Note: Also romanized as Gūr Moḩammad; also known as Tīzāb (تيزاب)) is a village in Mirbag-e Jonubi Rural District of Mirbag District in Delfan County, Lorestan province, Iran.

== Demographics ==
=== Population ===
At the time of the 2006 National Census, the village's population was 150 in 28 households, when it was in the Central District. The following census in 2011 counted 177 people in 33 households. The 2016 census measured the population of the village as 122 people in 27 households.

In 2022, the rural district was separated from the district in the formation of Mirbag District.
