= Hedayat Aleh =

Village in Lorestan province, Iran

Hedayat Aleh Persian: هدايت اله
- Village
- Location within Iran
- Coordinates: 33°55′56″N 47°50′26″E
- Country: Iran
- Province: Lorestan
- County: Delfan
- District: Mirbag
- Rural District: Mirbag-e Jonubi

Population (2016)
  - Total: 102
- Time zone: UTC+3:30 (IRST)

Hedayat Aleh (Persian: هدايت اله) (Note: Also romanized as Hadāīt Āleh and Hedāyat Āleh; also known as Gach Bandi (گچ بندي), also romanized as Gach Bandī, and Gach Bandī-ye Tīzāb) is a village in Mirbag-e Jonubi Rural District of Mirbag District in Delfan County, Lorestan province, Iran.

== Demographics ==
=== Population ===
At the time of the 2006 National Census, the village's population was 128 in 29 households, when it was in the Central District. The following census in 2011 counted 127 people in 31 households. The 2016 census measured the population of the village as 102 people in 22 households.

In 2022, the rural district was separated from the district in the formation of Mirbag District.
