= Abbasabad-e Kani Kabud =

Village in Lorestan province, Iran

Abbasabad-e Kani Kabud Persian: عباس آباد کاني کبود
- Village
- Location within Iran
- Coordinates: 34°00′27″N 47°58′17″E
- Country: Iran
- Province: Lorestan
- County: Delfan
- District: Mirbag
- Rural District: Mirbag-e Shomali

Population (2016)
  - Total: 61
- Time zone: UTC+3:30 (IRST)

Abbasabad-e Kani Kabud (Persian: عباس آباد کاني کبود) (Note: Also romanized as ‘Abbāsābād-e Kānī Kābūd and ‘Abbāsābād-e Kon Kābūd) is a village in Mirbag-e Shomali Rural District of Mirbag District in Delfan County, Lorestan province, Iran.

== Demographics ==
=== Population ===
At the time of the 2006 National Census, the village's population was 53 in 10 households, when it was in the Central District. The following census in 2011 counted 73 people in 13 households. The 2016 census measured the population of the village as 61 people in 14 households.

In 2022, the rural district was separated from the district in the formation of Mirbag District.
