= Zaliabad Yarnazar =

Village in Lorestan province, Iran

Zaliabad Yarnazar Persian: زالي آباد يارنظر
- Village
- Location within Iran
- Coordinates: 33°58′40″N 48°00′10″E
- Country: Iran
- Province: Lorestan
- County: Delfan
- District: Mirbag
- Rural District: Mirbag-e Shomali

Population (2016)
  - Total: 273
- Time zone: UTC+3:30 (IRST)

Zaliabad Yarnazar (Persian: زالي آباد يارنظر) (Note: Also romanized as Zālīābād Yārnaẓar; also known as Zālīābād, Zaliabad Yarnazir, and Zālīābād Yārnaẓir) is a village in Mirbag-e Shomali Rural District of Mirbag District in Delfan County, Lorestan province, Iran.

== Demographics ==
=== Population ===
At the time of the 2006 National Census, the village's population was 739 in 151 households, when it was in the Central District. The following census in 2011 counted 435 people in 89 households. The 2016 census measured the population of the village as 273 people in 75 households.

In 2022, the rural district was separated from the district in the formation of Mirbag District.
