= Yusefabad-e Abdolmeni =

Village in Lorestan province, Iran

Yusefabad-e Abdolmeni Persian: يوسف آباد عبدالمني
- Village
- Location within Iran
- Coordinates: 33°55′31″N 47°56′36″E
- Country: Iran
- Province: Lorestan
- County: Delfan
- District: Mirbag
- Rural District: Mirbag-e Jonubi

Population (2016)
  - Total: 76
- Time zone: UTC+3:30 (IRST)

Yusefabad-e Abdolmeni (Persian: يوسف آباد عبدالمني) (Note: Also romanized as Yūsefābād-e ‘Abdolmenī; also known as Yūsefābād and Yūsefābād-e ‘Abdollāhī) is a village in Mirbag-e Jonubi Rural District of Mirbag District in Delfan County, Lorestan province, Iran.

== Demographics ==
=== Population ===
At the time of the 2006 National Census, the village's population was 189 in 42 households, when it was in the Central District. The following census in 2011 counted 125 people in 34 households. The 2016 census measured the population of the village as 76 people in 26 households.

In 2022, the rural district was separated from the district in the formation of Mirbag District.
