= Gerdakaneh, Lorestan =

Village in Lorestan province, Iran

Gerdakaneh Persian: گردكانه
- Village
- Location within Iran
- Coordinates: 33°52′46″N 47°48′17″E
- Country: Iran
- Province: Lorestan
- County: Delfan
- District: Mirbag
- Rural District: Mirbag-e Jonubi

Population (2016)
  - Total: 135
- Time zone: UTC+3:30 (IRST)

Gerdakaneh (Persian: گردكانه) (Note: Also romanized as Gerdakāneh; also known as Gerdeh Kohneh, Gerdeh Koneh, and Kerdeh Kohneh) is a village in Mirbag-e Jonubi Rural District of Mirbag District in Delfan County, Lorestan province, Iran.

== Demographics ==
=== Population ===
At the time of the 2006 National Census, the village's population was 242 in 49 households, when it was in the Central District. The following census in 2011 counted 149 people in 40 households. The 2016 census measured the population of the village as 135 people in 40 households.

In 2022, the rural district was separated from the district in the formation of Mirbag District.
