= Gorg Aliabad =

Village in Lorestan province, Iran

Gorg Aliabad Persian: گرگعلي آباد
- Village
- Location within Iran
- Country: Iran
- Province: Lorestan
- County: Delfan
- District: Mirbag
- Rural District: Mirbag-e Shomali

Population (2016)
  - Total: 68
- Time zone: UTC+3:30 (IRST)

Gorg Aliabad (Persian: گرگعلي آباد) (Note: Also romanized as Gorg ‘Alīābād; also known as Gorg ‘Alī-ye Nowrūz) is a village in Mirbag-e Shomali Rural District of Mirbag District in Delfan County, Lorestan province, Iran.

== Demographics ==
=== Population ===
At the time of the 2006 National Census, the village's population was 78 in 15 households, when it was in the Central District. The following census in 2011 counted 82 people in 18 households. The 2016 census measured the population of the village as 68 people in 13 households.

In 2022, the rural district was separated from the district in the formation of Mirbag District.
