= Sardarabad, Delfan =

Village in Lorestan province, Iran

Sardarabad Persian: سردارآباد
- Village
- Location within Iran
- Coordinates: 33°58′12″N 48°01′38″E
- Country: Iran
- Province: Lorestan
- County: Delfan
- District: Mirbag
- Rural District: Mirbag-e Shomali

Population (2016)
  - Total: 98
- Time zone: UTC+3:30 (IRST)

Sardarabad (Persian: سردارآباد) (Note: Also romanized as Sardārābād) is a village in Mirbag-e Shomali Rural District of Mirbag District in Delfan County, Lorestan province, Iran.

== Demographics ==
=== Population ===
At the time of the 2006 National Census, the village's population was 100 in 21 households, when it was in the Central District. The following census in 2011 counted 96 people in 22 households. The 2016 census measured the population of the village as 98 people in 29 households.

In 2022, the rural district was separated from the district in the formation of Mirbag District.
