= Darbid-e Zangivand =

Village in Lorestan province, Iran

Darbid-e Zangivand Persian: داربيدزنگيوند
- Village
- Location within Iran
- Coordinates: 34°00′05″N 47°56′53″E
- Country: Iran
- Province: Lorestan
- County: Delfan
- District: Mirbag
- Rural District: Mirbag-e Shomali

Population (2016)
  - Total: 188
- Time zone: UTC+3:30 (IRST)

Darbid-e Zangivand (Persian: داربيدزنگيوند) (Note: Also romanized as Dārbīd-e Zangīvand) is a village in Mirbag-e Shomali Rural District of Mirbag District in Delfan County, Lorestan province, Iran.

== Demographics ==
=== Population ===
At the time of the 2006 National Census, the village's population was 183 in 34 households, when it was in the Central District. The following census in 2011 counted 199 people in 46 households. The 2016 census measured the population of the village as 188 people in 46 households.

In 2022, the rural district was separated from the district in the formation of Mirbag District.
