= Ramazanabad =

Village in Lorestan province, Iran

Ramazanabad Persian: رمضان آباد
- Village
- Location within Iran
- Coordinates: 33°56′09″N 47°59′59″E
- Country: Iran
- Province: Lorestan
- County: Delfan
- District: Mirbag
- Rural District: Mirbag-e Shomali

Population (2016)
  - Total: 142
- Time zone: UTC+3:30 (IRST)

Ramazanabad (Persian: رمضان آباد) (Note: Also romanized as Ramaẕānābād and Ramezānābād; also known as Ramaẕānābād-e Qorbān ‘Alī, Rashnū, and Shanū) is a village in Mirbag-e Shomali Rural District of Mirbag District in Delfan County, Lorestan province, Iran.

== Demographics ==
=== Population ===
At the time of the 2006 National Census, the village's population was 165 in 33 households, when it was in the Central District. The following census in 2011 counted 140 people in 38 households. The 2016 census measured the population of the village as 142 people in 39 households.

In 2022, the rural district was separated from the district in the formation of Mirbag District.
