= Hemmatabad, Delfan =

Village in Lorestan province, Iran

Hemmatabad Persian: همت اباد
- Village
- Location within Iran
- Coordinates: 33°59′33″N 47°59′05″E
- Country: Iran
- Province: Lorestan
- County: Delfan
- District: Mirbag
- Rural District: Mirbag-e Shomali

Population (2016)
  - Total: 103
- Time zone: UTC+3:30 (IRST)

Hemmatabad (Persian: همت اباد) (Note: Also romanized as Hemmatābād; also known as Hemmatābād-e ‘Olyā) is a village in Mirbag-e Shomali Rural District of Mirbag District in Delfan County, Lorestan province, Iran.

== Demographics ==
=== Population ===
At the time of the 2006 National Census, the village's population was 178 in 33 households, when it was in the Central District. The following census in 2011 counted 158 people in 29 households. The 2016 census measured the population of the village as 103 people in 27 households.

In 2022, the rural district was separated from the district in the formation of Mirbag District.
