= Kan Khan-e Masumeh =

Village in Lorestan province, Iran

Kan Khan-e Masumeh Persian: كن خان معصوم
- Village
- Location within Iran
- Coordinates: 33°55′29″N 47°52′22″E
- Country: Iran
- Province: Lorestan
- County: Delfan
- District: Mirbag
- Rural District: Mirbag-e Jonubi

Population (2016)
  - Total: Below reporting threshold
- Time zone: UTC+3:30 (IRST)

Kan Khan-e Masumeh (Persian: كن خان معصوم) (Note: Also romanized as Kan Khān-e Ma‘şūmeh; also known as Kankhvān-e Ma‘şūmābād) is a village in Mirbag-e Jonubi Rural District of Mirbag District in Delfan County, Lorestan province, Iran.

== Demographics ==
=== Population ===
At the time of the 2006 National Census, the village's population was 116 in 18 households, when it was in the Central District. The following census in 2011 counted 18 people in four households. The 2016 census measured the population of the village as below the reporting threshold.

In 2022, the rural district was separated from the district in the formation of Mirbag District.
