= Jafarabad-e Pain, Lorestan =

Village in Lorestan province, Iran

Jafarabad-e Pain Persian: جعفرآبادپايين
- Village
- Location within Iran
- Coordinates: 33°57′46″N 47°59′57″E
- Country: Iran
- Province: Lorestan
- County: Delfan
- District: Mirbag
- Rural District: Mirbag-e Shomali

Population (2016)
  - Total: 363
- Time zone: UTC+3:30 (IRST)

Jafarabad-e Pain (Persian: جعفرآبادپايين) (Note: Also romanized as Ja‘farābād-e Pā’īn; formerly known as Jafarabad-e Sofla (جعفرآباد سفلي), also romanized as Ja‘farābād-e Soflá; also known as Ja‘farābād) is a village in Mirbag-e Shomali Rural District of Mirbag District in Delfan County, Lorestan province, Iran.

== Demographics ==
=== Population ===
At the time of the 2006 National Census, the village's population, as Jafarabad-e Sofla, was 159 in 32 households, when it was in the Central District. The following census in 2011 counted 157 people in 49 households, by which time the village was listed as Jafarabad-e Pain. The 2016 census measured the population of the village as 363 people in 101 households.

In 2022, the rural district was separated from the district in the formation of Mirbag District.
