= Sohbatabad, Lorestan =

Village in Lorestan province, Iran

Sohbatabad Persian: صحبت اباد
- Village
- Location within Iran
- Coordinates: 33°57′51″N 48°00′47″E
- Country: Iran
- Province: Lorestan
- County: Delfan
- District: Mirbag
- Rural District: Mirbag-e Shomali

Population (2016)
  - Total: 89
- Time zone: UTC+3:30 (IRST)

Sohbatabad (Persian: صحبت اباد) (Note: Also romanized as Şoḩbatābād; also known as Şeḩḩatābād) is a village in Mirbag-e Shomali Rural District of Mirbag District in Delfan County, Lorestan province, Iran.

== Demographics ==
=== Population ===
At the time of the 2006 National Census, the village's population was 110 in 20 households, when it was in the Central District. The following census in 2011 counted 96 people in 20 households. The 2016 census measured the population of the village as 89 people in 21 households.

In 2022, the rural district was separated from the district in the formation of Mirbag District.
