= Aziz Koshteh =

Village in Lorestan province, Iran

Aziz Koshteh Persian: عزيز کشته
- Village
- Location within Iran
- Coordinates: 33°52′03″N 47°49′26″E
- Country: Iran
- Province: Lorestan
- County: Delfan
- District: Mirbag
- Rural District: Mirbag-e Jonubi

Population (2016)
  - Total: 204
- Time zone: UTC+3:30 (IRST)

Aziz Koshteh (Persian: عزيز کشته) (Note: Also romanized as ‘Azīz Koshteh; also known as ‘Azīzābād (عزيزآباد)) is a village in Mirbag-e Jonubi Rural District of Mirbag District in Delfan County, Lorestan province, Iran.

== Demographics ==
=== Population ===
At the time of the 2006 National Census, the village's population was 252 in 52 households, when it was in the Central District. The following census in 2011 counted 260 people in 68 households. The 2016 census measured the population of the village as 204 people in 55 households.

In 2022, the rural district was separated from the district in the formation of Mirbag District.
