= Kazemabad, Nurabad =

Village in Lorestan province, Iran

Kazemabad Persian: کاظم آباد
- Village
- Location within Iran
- Country: Iran
- Province: Lorestan
- County: Delfan
- District: Central
- Rural District: Nurabad

Population (2016)
  - Total: 1,381
- Time zone: UTC+3:30 (IRST)

Kazemabad (Persian: کاظم آباد) (Note: Also romanized as Kāz̧emābād) is a village in Nurabad Rural District of the Central District in Delfan County, Lorestan province, Iran.

== Demographics ==
=== Population ===
At the time of the 2006 National Census, the village's population was 676 in 130 households. The following census in 2011 counted 1,219 people in 268 households. The 2016 census measured the population of the village as 1,381 people in 364 households.
