= Mohammad Shahabad =

Village in Lorestan province, Iran

Mohammad Shahabad Persian: محمدشاه آباد
- Village
- Location within Iran
- Coordinates: 33°56′32″N 47°59′45″E
- Country: Iran
- Province: Lorestan
- County: Delfan
- District: Mirbag
- Rural District: Mirbag-e Shomali

Population (2016)
  - Total: 37
- Time zone: UTC+3:30 (IRST)

Mohammad Shahabad (Persian: محمدشاه آباد) (Note: Also romanized as Moḩammad Shāhābād; also known as ‘Azīzābād (عزيز آباد)) is a village in Mirbag-e Shomali Rural District of Mirbag District in Delfan County, Lorestan province, Iran.

== Demographics ==
=== Population ===
At the time of the 2006 National Census, the village's population was 43 in 10 households, when it was in the Central District. The following census in 2011 counted 57 people in 13 households. The 2016 census measured the population of the village as 37 people in 12 households.

In 2022, the rural district was separated from the district in the formation of Mirbag District.
