= Cheshmeh Khani, Delfan =

Village in Lorestan province, Iran

Cheshmeh Khani Persian: چشمه خاني
- Village
- Location within Iran
- Coordinates: 34°02′41″N 47°58′47″E
- Country: Iran
- Province: Lorestan
- County: Delfan
- District: Central
- Rural District: Nurabad

Population (2016)
  - Total: 1,603
- Time zone: UTC+3:30 (IRST)

Cheshmeh Khani (Persian: چشمه خاني) (Note: Also romanized as Cheshmeh Khānī) is a village in Nurabad Rural District of the Central District in Delfan County, Lorestan province, Iran.

== Demographics ==
=== Population ===
At the time of the 2006 National Census, the village's population was 347 in 65 households. The following census in 2011 counted 917 people in 219 households. The 2016 census measured the population of the village as 1,603 people in 423 households.
