= Jafarabad-e Sofla =

Jafarabad-e Sofla (Persian: جعفرابادسفلي) may refer to:

- Jafarabad-e Sofla, Fars
- Jafarabad-e Sofla, Lorestan
- Jafarabad-e Sofla, North Khorasan
