= Karamabad, Nurabad =

Village in Lorestan province, Iran

Karamabad Persian: کرم آباد
- Village
- Location within Iran
- Coordinates: 34°03′23″N 47°57′31″E
- Country: Iran
- Province: Lorestan
- County: Delfan
- District: Central
- Rural District: Nurabad

Population (2016)
  - Total: 746
- Time zone: UTC+3:30 (IRST)

Karamabad (Persian: کرم آباد) (Note: Also romanized as Karamābād) is a village in Nurabad Rural District of the Central District in Delfan County, Lorestan province, Iran.

== Demographics ==
=== Population ===
At the time of the 2006 National Census, the village's population was 194 in 34 households. The following census in 2011 counted 558 people in 145 households. The 2016 census measured the population of the village as 746 people in 192 households.
