= Kul Marz Sofla =

Kul Marz Sofla كول مرزسفلي
- Village
- Country: Iran
- Province: Lorestan
- County: Delfan
- Bakhsh: Central
- Rural District: Nurabad

Population (2006)
  - Total: 52
- Time zone: UTC+3:30 (IRST)
  - Summer (DST): UTC+4:30 (IRDT)

Kul Marz Sofla (Persian: كول مرزسفلي, also Romanized as Kūl Marz Soflá) is a village in Nurabad Rural District, in the Central District of Delfan County, Lorestan Province, Iran. At the 2006 census, its population was 52, in 12 families.
