= Khalifehabad =

Village in Lorestan province, Iran

Khalifehabad Persian: خليفه آباد
- Village
- Location within Iran
- Coordinates: 34°04′20″N 47°59′30″E
- Country: Iran
- Province: Lorestan
- County: Delfan
- District: Central
- Rural District: Nurabad

Population (2016)
  - Total: 1,864
- Time zone: UTC+3:30 (IRST)

Khalifehabad (Persian: خليفه آباد) (Note: Also romanized as Khalīfehābād) is a village in Nurabad Rural District of the Central District in Delfan County, Lorestan province, Iran.

== Demographics ==
=== Population ===
At the time of the 2006 National Census, the village's population was 909 in 169 households. The following census in 2011 counted 1,182 people in 276 households. The 2016 census measured the population of the village as 1,864 people in 504 households, the most populous in its rural district.
