= Babajan =

Babajan may refer to:

== People ==
- Hazrat Babajan (c. 1806-1931), Indian religious figure
- Abdul Wahid Baba Jan, Afghan general
- Baba Jan (politician), political activist from Gilgit-Baltistan administrative territory of Pakistan

== Places ==
- Tsapatagh, Armenia - formerly Babajan
- Babajan, Lorestan, village in Iran

== See also ==
- Baba Jan (disambiguation)
