= Hajji Morad, Delfan =

Village in Lorestan province, Iran

Hajji Morad Persian: حاجي مراد
- Village
- Location within Iran
- Coordinates: 33°52′04″N 47°47′56″E
- Country: Iran
- Province: Lorestan
- County: Delfan
- District: Mirbag
- Rural District: Mirbag-e Jonubi

Population (2016)
  - Total: 66
- Time zone: UTC+3:30 (IRST)

Hajji Morad (Persian: حاجي مراد) (Note: Also romanized as Hājjī Morād) is a village in Mirbag-e Jonubi Rural District of Mirbag District in Delfan County, Lorestan province, Iran.

== Demographics ==
=== Population ===
At the time of the 2006 National Census, the village's population was 81 in 18 households, when it was in the Central District. The following census in 2011 counted 81 people in 21 households. The 2016 census measured the population of the village as 66 people in 18 households.

In 2022, the rural district was separated from the district in the formation of Mirbag District.
