= Shah Qoliabad =

Village in Lorestan province, Iran

Shah Qoliabad Persian: شاه قلي آباد
- Village
- Location within Iran
- Coordinates: 33°54′42″N 47°54′08″E
- Country: Iran
- Province: Lorestan
- County: Delfan
- District: Mirbag
- Rural District: Mirbag-e Jonubi

Population (2016)
  - Total: 82
- Time zone: UTC+3:30 (IRST)

Shah Qoliabad (Persian: شاه قلي آباد) (Note: Also romanized as Shāh Qolīābād; also known as Deh-e Abuzar (ده ابوذر) and Shāh Qolī) is a village in Mirbag-e Jonubi Rural District of Mirbag District in Delfan County, Lorestan province, Iran.

== Demographics ==
=== Population ===
At the time of the 2006 National Census, the village's population was 65 in 14 households, when it was in the Central District. The following census in 2011 counted 77 people in 16 households. The 2016 census measured the population of the village as 82 people in 21 households.

In 2022, the rural district was separated from the district in the formation of Mirbag District.
