= Cham Zel-e Shahali =

Village in Lorestan province, Iran

Cham Zel-e Shahali Persian: چم ظل شاه علي
- Village
- Location within Iran
- Coordinates: 33°52′48″N 47°53′56″E
- Country: Iran
- Province: Lorestan
- County: Delfan
- District: Mirbag
- Rural District: Mirbag-e Jonubi

Population (2016)
  - Total: 34
- Time zone: UTC+3:30 (IRST)

Cham Zel-e Shahali (Persian: چم ظل شاه علي) (Note: Also romanized as Cham Z̧el-e Shāh‘alī; also known as Nazarabad (نظرآباد), also romanized as Naz̄arābād) is a village in Mirbag-e Jonubi Rural District of Mirbag District in Delfan County, Lorestan province, Iran.

== Demographics ==
=== Population ===
At the time of the 2006 National Census, the village's population was 28 in seven households, when it was in the Central District. The following census in 2011 counted 29 people in seven households. The 2016 census measured the population of the village as 34 people in 10 households.

In 2022, the rural district was separated from the district in the formation of Mirbag District.
