= Kul Marz Olya =

Kul Marz Olya كول مرزعليا
- Village
- Interactive map of Kul Marz Olya
- Country: Iran
- Province: Lorestan
- County: Delfan
- Bakhsh: Central
- Rural District: Nurabad

Population (2006)
  - Total: 91
- Time zone: UTC+3:30 (IRST)
  - Summer (DST): UTC+4:30 (IRDT)

Kul Marz Olya (Persian: كول مرزعليا, also Romanized as Kūl Marz ʿOlyā) is a village in Nurabad Rural District, in the Central District of Delfan County, Lorestan Province, Iran. At the 2006 census, its population was 91, in 19 families.
