= Zafarabad, Nurabad =

Village in Lorestan province, Iran

Zafarabad Persian: ظفرآباد
- Village
- Location within Iran
- Coordinates: 34°03′43″N 47°55′04″E
- Country: Iran
- Province: Lorestan
- County: Delfan
- District: Central
- Rural District: Nurabad

Population (2016)
  - Total: 795
- Time zone: UTC+3:30 (IRST)

Zafarabad (Persian: ظفرآباد) (Note: Also romanized as Z̧afarābād) is a village in, and the capital of, Nurabad Rural District in the Central District of Delfan County, Lorestan province, Iran.

== Demographics ==
=== Population ===
At the time of the 2006 National Census, the village's population was 716 in 169 households. The following census in 2011 counted 818 people in 222 households. The 2016 census measured the population of the village as 795 people in 221 households.
