= Kan Khan-e Yaqub =

Village in Lorestan province, Iran

Kan Khan-e Yaqub Persian: كن خان يعقوب
- Village
- Location within Iran
- Coordinates: 33°55′34″N 47°51′58″E
- Country: Iran
- Province: Lorestan
- County: Delfan
- District: Mirbag
- Rural District: Mirbag-e Jonubi

Population (2016)
  - Total: 105
- Time zone: UTC+3:30 (IRST)

Kan Khan-e Yaqub (Persian: كن خان يعقوب) (Note: Also romanized as Kan Khān-e Ya‘qūb; also known as Kankhvān) is a village in Mirbag-e Jonubi Rural District of Mirbag District in Delfan County, Lorestan province, Iran.

== Demographics ==
=== Population ===
At the time of the 2006 National Census, the village's population was 23 in five households, when it was in the Central District. The following census in 2011 counted 135 people in 36 households. The 2016 census measured the population of the village as 105 people in 27 households.

In 2022, the rural district was separated from the district in the formation of Mirbag District.
