= Nazarabad, Mirbag =

Village in Lorestan province, Iran

Nazarabad Persian: نظراباد
- Village
- Location within Iran
- Coordinates: 33°53′43″N 48°00′15″E
- Country: Iran
- Province: Lorestan
- County: Delfan
- District: Mirbag
- Rural District: Mirbag-e Shomali

Population (2016)
  - Total: 146
- Time zone: UTC+3:30 (IRST)

Nazarabad (Persian: نظراباد) (Note: Also romanized as Naz̄arābād and Naz̧arābād) is a village in Mirbag-e Shomali Rural District of Mirbag District in Delfan County, Lorestan province, Iran.

== Demographics ==
=== Population ===
At the time of the 2006 National Census, the village's population was 218 in 40 households, when it was in the Central District. The following census in 2011 counted 123 people in 26 households. The 2016 census measured the population of the village as 146 people in 37 households.

In 2022, the rural district was separated from the district in the formation of Mirbag District.
