= Fattahabad, Lorestan =

Village in Lorestan province, Iran

Fattahabad Persian: فتاح اباد
- Village
- Location within Iran
- Coordinates: 33°58′49″N 47°56′21″E
- Country: Iran
- Province: Lorestan
- County: Delfan
- District: Mirbag
- Rural District: Mirbag-e Shomali

Population (2016)
  - Total: 452
- Time zone: UTC+3:30 (IRST)

Fattahabad (Persian: فتاح اباد) (Note: Also romanized as Fattāḩābād; also known as Fatḩābād) is a village in Mirbag-e Shomali Rural District of Mirbag District in Delfan County, Lorestan province, Iran.

== Demographics ==
=== Population ===
At the time of the 2006 National Census, the village's population was 501 in 111 households, when it was in the Central District. The following census in 2011 counted 528 people in 135 households. The 2016 census measured the population of the village as 452 people in 131 households.

In 2022, the rural district was separated from the district in the formation of Mirbag District.
