= Sohrababad, Lorestan =

Village in Lorestan province, Iran

Sohrababad Persian: سهراب آباد
- Village
- Location within Iran
- Coordinates: 33°58′40″N 47°55′20″E
- Country: Iran
- Province: Lorestan
- County: Delfan
- District: Mirbag
- Rural District: Mirbag-e Shomali

Population (2016)
  - Total: 83
- Time zone: UTC+3:30 (IRST)

Sohrababad (Persian: سهراب آباد) (Note: Also romanized as Sohrābābād) is a village in Mirbag-e Shomali Rural District of Mirbag District in Delfan County, Lorestan province, Iran.

== Demographics ==
=== Population ===
At the time of the 2006 National Census, the village's population was 171 in 37 households, when it was in the Central District. The following census in 2011 counted 101 people in 23 households. The 2016 census measured the population of the village as 83 people in 29 households.

In 2022, the rural district was separated from the district in the formation of Mirbag District.
