= Mirbag =

Village in Lorestan province, Iran

Mirbag Persian: میربگ
- Village
- Location within Iran
- Coordinates: 33°59′17″N 47°59′34″E
- Country: Iran
- Province: Lorestan
- County: Delfan
- District: Mirbag
- Rural District: Mirbag-e Shomali
- Established as a village: 2022
- Time zone: UTC+3:30 (IRST)

Mirbag (Persian: میربگ) (Note: Also romanized as Mīrbag) is a village in Mirbag-e Shomali Rural District of Mirbag District in Delfan County, Lorestan province, Iran, serving as capital of the district.

== History ==
In 2022, the rural district was separated from the Central District in the formation of Mirbag District. The villages of Farhadabad (Note: Former capital of Mirbag-e Shomali Rural District) and Shahnabad merged to form the new village of Mirbag.
