= Sarab-e Ahmadvand =

Village in Lorestan province, Iran

Sarab-e Ahmadvand Persian: سراب احمدوند
- Village
- Location within Iran
- Coordinates: 34°04′04″N 47°52′51″E
- Country: Iran
- Province: Lorestan
- County: Delfan
- District: Central
- Rural District: Nurabad

Population (2016)
  - Total: 935
- Time zone: UTC+3:30 (IRST)

Sarab-e Ahmadvand (Persian: سراب احمدوند) (Note: Also romanized as Sarāb-e Aḩmadvand; also known as Gachīneh, Gajīneh, and Machīneh) is a village in Nurabad Rural District of the Central District in Delfan County, Lorestan province, Iran.

== Demographics ==
=== Population ===
At the time of the 2006 National Census, the village's population was 671 in 143 households. The following census in 2011 counted 675 people in 178 households. The 2016 census measured the population of the village as 935 people in 274 households.
