= Nosratabad-e Sofla =

Village in Lorestan province, Iran

Nosratabad-e Sofla Persian: نصرت ابادسفلي
- Village
- Location within Iran
- Coordinates: 33°58′13″N 48°00′57″E
- Country: Iran
- Province: Lorestan
- County: Delfan
- District: Mirbag
- Rural District: Mirbag-e Shomali

Population (2016)
  - Total: 239
- Time zone: UTC+3:30 (IRST)

Nosratabad-e Sofla (Persian: نصرت ابادسفلي) (Note: Also romanized as Noşratābād-e Soflá; also known as Noşratābād) is a village in Mirbag-e Shomali Rural District of Mirbag District in Delfan County, Lorestan province, Iran.

== Demographics ==
=== Population ===
At the time of the 2006 National Census, the village's population was 171 in 40 households, when it was in the Central District. The following census in 2011 counted 218 people in 53 households. The 2016 census measured the population of the village as 239 people in 62 households.

In 2022, the rural district was separated from the district in the formation of Mirbag District.
