= Moradabad-e Mirakhur =

Village in Lorestan province, Iran

Moradabad-e Mirakhur Persian: مرادابادميراخور
- Village
- Location within Iran
- Coordinates: 33°56′56″N 47°59′23″E
- Country: Iran
- Province: Lorestan
- County: Delfan
- District: Mirbag
- Rural District: Mirbag-e Shomali

Population (2016)
  - Total: 234
- Time zone: UTC+3:30 (IRST)

Moradabad-e Mirakhur (Persian: مرادابادميراخور) (Note: Also romanized as Morādābād-e Mīr Ākhvor and Morādābād-e Mīrākhūr; also known as Morādābād) is a village in Mirbag-e Shomali Rural District of Mirbag District in Delfan County, Lorestan province, Iran.

== Demographics ==
=== Population ===
At the time of the 2006 National Census, the village's population was 239 in 53 households, when it was in the Central District. The following census in 2011 counted 226 people in 62 households. The 2016 census measured the population of the village as 234 people in 64 households.

In 2022, the rural district was separated from the district in the formation of Mirbag District.
