= Baba Jani =

Baba Jani may refer to:

== Places in Iran ==
- Baba Jani-ye Abd ol Mohammad
- Baba Jani-ye Bala
- Baba Jani-ye Shah Morad

== Other uses ==
- Baba Jani (TV series), a Pakistani drama serial that premiered in 2018

== See also ==
- Babajani Durrani, Indian politician
- Baba Jan (disambiguation)
