= Nosratabad-e Olya =

Village in Lorestan province, Iran

Nosratabad-e Olya Persian: نصرت ابادعليا
- Village
- Location within Iran
- Coordinates: 33°58′11″N 48°00′39″E
- Country: Iran
- Province: Lorestan
- County: Delfan
- District: Mirbag
- Rural District: Mirbag-e Shomali

Population (2016)
  - Total: 174
- Time zone: UTC+3:30 (IRST)

Nosratabad-e Olya (Persian: نصرت ابادعليا) (Note: Also romanized as Noşratābād-e ‘Olyá) is a village in Mirbag-e Shomali Rural District of Mirbag District in Delfan County, Lorestan province, Iran.

== Demographics ==
=== Population ===
At the time of the 2006 National Census, the village's population was 210 in 44 households, when it was in the Central District. The following census in 2011 counted 177 people in 43 households. The 2016 census measured the population of the village as 174 people in 42 households.

In 2022, the rural district was separated from the district in the formation of Mirbag District.
