= Moradabad-e Gol Gol =

Village in Lorestan province, Iran

Moradabad-e Gol Gol Persian: مرادابادكل كل
- Village
- Location within Iran
- Coordinates: 33°58′26″N 47°57′12″E
- Country: Iran
- Province: Lorestan
- County: Delfan
- District: Mirbag
- Rural District: Mirbag-e Shomali

Population (2016)
  - Total: 189
- Time zone: UTC+3:30 (IRST)

Moradabad-e Gol Gol (Persian: مرادابادكل كل) (Note: Also romanized as Morādābād-e Gol Gol) is a village in Mirbag-e Shomali Rural District of Mirbag District in Delfan County, Lorestan province, Iran.

== Demographics ==
=== Population ===
At the time of the 2006 National Census, the village's population was 176 in 37 households, when it was in the Central District. The following census in 2011 counted 162 people in 41 households. The 2016 census measured the population of the village as 189 people in 53 households.

In 2022, the rural district was separated from the district in the formation of Mirbag District.
