= Mirbag-e Jonubi Rural District =

Rural district in Lorestan province, Iran

Mirbag-e Jonubi Rural District Persian: دهستان میربگ جنوبی
- Rural District
- Location within Iran
- Coordinates: 33°55′N 47°51′E
- Country: Iran
- Province: Lorestan
- County: Delfan
- District: Mirbag
- Established: 1987
- Capital: Dam Bagh Yusefabad

Population (2016)
  - Total: 5,819
- Time zone: UTC+3:30 (IRST)

Mirbag-e Jonubi Rural District (Persian: دهستان میربگ جنوبی) is in Mirbag District of Delfan County, Lorestan province, Iran. Its capital is the village of Dam Bagh Yusefabad.

== Demographics ==
=== Population ===
At the time of the 2006 National Census, the rural district's population (as a part of the Central District) was 6,636 in 1,426 households. There were 6,639 inhabitants in 1,597 households at the following census of 2011. The 2016 census measured the population of the rural district as 5,819 in 1,665 households. The most populous of its 43 villages was Meleh Khan, with 870 people.

In 2022, the rural district was separated from the district in the formation of Mirbag District.

=== Other villages in the rural district ===
- Abbasabad
- Aliabad
- Anbarteh-ye Pain
- Aziz Koshteh
- Cham Zel-e Shahali
- Cheraghabad
- Deh Yusefan-e Bala
- Deh Yusefan-e Sofla
- Dul Bid
- Fazelabad
- Ganj Darreh-ye Bala
- Ganj Darreh-ye Pain
- Gerdakaneh
- Gur Mohammad
- Hajji Morad
- Hajjiabad
- Hedayat Aleh
- Kan Khan-e Masumeh
- Kan Khan-e Yaqub
- Karimabad
- Kazemi
- Khodaverdi
- Malekabad
- Mirali
- Mirzaabad
- Nematabad
- Rezaabad-e Reza Veys
- Sar Marang
- Shah Qoliabad
- Yusefabad Cham Chal
- Yusefabad-e Abdolmeni
