= Deh Yusefan-e Sofla =

Village in Lorestan province, Iran

Deh Yusefan-e Sofla Persian: ده يوسفان سفلي
- Village
- Location within Iran
- Coordinates: 33°52′49″N 47°55′39″E
- Country: Iran
- Province: Lorestan
- County: Delfan
- District: Mirbag
- Rural District: Mirbag-e Jonubi

Population (2016)
  - Total: 212
- Time zone: UTC+3:30 (IRST)

Deh Yusefan-e Sofla (Persian: ده يوسفان سفلي) (Note: Also romanized as Deh Yūsefān-e Soflá; also known as Deh Yūsefān-e Pā'īn and Dīv Saffān-e Soflá) is a village in Mirbag-e Jonubi Rural District of Mirbag District in Delfan County, Lorestan province, Iran.

== Demographics ==
=== Population ===
At the time of the 2006 National Census, the village's population was 194 in 42 households, when it was in the Central District. The following census in 2011 counted 182 people in 48 households. The 2016 census measured the population of the village as 212 people in 66 households.

In 2022, the rural district was separated from the district in the formation of Mirbag District.
