= Moradabad, Nurabad =

Moradabad مرادآباد
- Village
- Location within Iran
- Coordinates: 34°06′04″N 47°54′41″E
- Country: Iran
- Province: Lorestan
- County: Delfan
- Bakhsh: Central
- Rural District: Nurabad

Population (2006)
  - Total: 152
- Time zone: UTC+3:30 (IRST)
  - Summer (DST): UTC+4:30 (IRDT)

Moradabad (Persian: مرادآباد, also Romanized as Morādābād; also known as Qamar ‘Ālī) is a village in Nurabad Rural District, in the Central District of Delfan County, Lorestan Province, Iran. At the 2006 census, its population was 152, in 36 families.
