= Nusrat (disambiguation) =

Nusrat or Nusret is a unisex given name.

Nusrat or Nusret may also refer to:

- Ottoman minelayer Nusret, Ottoman and later Turkish minelayer ship
- Operation Nasrat, an operation by Taliban insurgents in 2007
- Nusrat railway station (Pakistan)

== See also ==
- Nosratabad (disambiguation)
- Nusrat Bhutto Colony, a neighbourhood in Karachi, Pakistan
- Nusrat Jehan Academy, a group of educational institutions in Punjab, Pakistan
