= Deh Yusefan-e Bala =

Village in Lorestan province, Iran

Deh Yusefan-e Bala Persian: ده يوسفان بالا
- Village
- Location within Iran
- Coordinates: 33°51′42″N 47°57′39″E
- Country: Iran
- Province: Lorestan
- County: Delfan
- District: Mirbag
- Rural District: Mirbag-e Jonubi

Population (2016)
  - Total: 22
- Time zone: UTC+3:30 (IRST)

Deh Yusefan-e Bala (Persian: ده يوسفان بالا) (Note: Also romanized as Deh Yūsefān-e Bālā; formerly known as Deh Yusefan-e Olya (ده يوسفان عليا), also romanized as Deh Yūsefān-e ‘Olyā; also known as Dīv Saffān-e ‘Olyā and Terkeleh (ترکله)) is a village in Mirbag-e Jonubi Rural District of Mirbag District in Delfan County, Lorestan province, Iran.

== Demographics ==
=== Population ===
At the time of the 2006 National Census, the village's population, as Deh Yusefan-e Olya, was 38 in seven households, when it was in the Central District. The following census in 2011 counted 20 people in four households, by which time the village was listed as Deh Yusefan-e Bala. The 2016 census measured the population of the village as 22 people in eight households.

In 2022, the rural district was separated from the district in the formation of Mirbag District.
