= Nosratabad-e Seh Dangeh =

Nosratabad-e Seh Dangeh نصرت ابادسه دانگه
- Village
- Location within Iran
- Coordinates: 28°20′52″N 56°55′47″E
- Country: Iran
- Province: Kerman
- County: Arzuiyeh
- Bakhsh: Soghan
- Rural District: Soghan

Population (2006)
  - Total: 313
- Time zone: UTC+3:30 (IRST)
  - Summer (DST): UTC+4:30 (IRDT)

Nosratabad-e Seh Dangeh (Persian: نصرت ابادسه دانگه, also Romanized as Noşratābād-e Seh Dāngeh) is a village in Soghan Rural District, Soghan District, Arzuiyeh County, Kerman Province, Iran. At the 2006 census, its population was 313, in 53 families.
