= Nazarabad, Mashhad =

Nazarabad نظراباد
- Village
- Location within Iran
- Coordinates: 36°00′31″N 59°33′07″E
- Country: Iran
- Province: Razavi Khorasan
- County: Mashhad
- Bakhsh: Ahmadabad
- Rural District: Sarjam

Population (2006)
  - Total: 146
- Time zone: UTC+3:30 (IRST)
  - Summer (DST): UTC+4:30 (IRDT)

Nazarabad (Persian: نظراباد, also Romanized as Naz̧arābād) is a village in Sarjam Rural District, Ahmadabad District, Mashhad County, Razavi Khorasan Province, Iran. At the 2006 census, its population was 146, in 39 families.
