= Nosratabad, Abgarm =

Nosratabad نصرت اباد
- Village
- Location within Iran
- Coordinates: 35°32′56″N 49°37′03″E
- Country: Iran
- Province: Qazvin
- County: Avaj
- Bakhsh: Abgarm
- Rural District: Kharaqan-e Sharqi

Population (2006)
  - Total: 81
- Time zone: UTC+3:30 (IRST)
  - Summer (DST): UTC+4:30 (IRDT)

Nosratabad (Persian: نصرت اباد, also Romanized as Noşratābād and Nūsratābād; also known as Noşratābād-e Qārādāsh, Noşratābād-e Qardāsh, and Qārdāsh) is a village in Kharaqan-e Sharqi Rural District, Abgarm District, Avaj County, Qazvin Province, Iran. At the 2006 census, its population was 81, in 17 families.
