= Nazarabad, Jahrom =

Nazarabad نظراباد
- Village
- Location within Iran
- Coordinates: 28°37′03″N 53°23′18″E
- Country: Iran
- Province: Fars
- County: Jahrom
- Bakhsh: Central
- Rural District: Jolgah

Population (2006)
  - Total: 153
- Time zone: UTC+3:30 (IRST)
  - Summer (DST): UTC+4:30 (IRDT)

Nazarabad (Persian: نظراباد, also Romanized as Naz̧arābād) is a village in Jolgah Rural District, in the Central District of Jahrom County, Fars province, Iran. At the 2006 census, its population was 153, in 33 families.
