= Sohbatabad, Kermanshah =

Sohbatabad صحبت اباد
- Village
- Country: Iran
- Province: Kermanshah
- County: Harsin
- Bakhsh: Central
- Rural District: Cheshmeh Kabud

Population (2006)
  - Total: 24
- Time zone: UTC+3:30 (IRST)
  - Summer (DST): UTC+4:30 (IRDT)

Sohbatabad (Persian: صحبت اباد, also Romanized as Şoḥbatābād) is a village in Cheshmeh Kabud Rural District, in the Central District of Harsin County, Kermanshah Province, Iran. At the 2006 census, its population was 24, in 5 families.
