= Moradabad, Masjed Soleyman =

Moradabad مراداباد
- Village
- Location within Iran
- Coordinates: 32°02′56″N 49°15′03″E
- Country: Iran
- Province: Khuzestan
- County: Masjed Soleyman
- Bakhsh: Central
- Rural District: Jahangiri

Population (2006)
  - Total: 40
- Time zone: UTC+3:30 (IRST)
  - Summer (DST): UTC+4:30 (IRDT)

Moradabad (Persian: مراداباد, also Romanized as Morādābād) is a village in Jahangiri Rural District, in the Central District of Masjed Soleyman County, Khuzestan Province, Iran. At the 2006 census, its population was 40, in 7 families.
