= Nazarabad, Selseleh =

Nazarabad نظراباد
- Village
- Location within Iran
- Coordinates: 33°50′27″N 48°12′41″E
- Country: Iran
- Province: Lorestan
- County: Selseleh
- Bakhsh: Central
- Rural District: Doab

Population (2006)
  - Total: 119
- Time zone: UTC+3:30 (IRST)
  - Summer (DST): UTC+4:30 (IRDT)

Nazarabad (Persian: نظراباد, also Romanized as Naz̧arābād) is a village in Doab Rural District, in the Central District of Selseleh County, Lorestan Province, Iran. At the 2006 census, its population was 119, in 21 families.
