= Moradabad-e Chahgavari =

Moradabad-e Chahgavari مراداباد چه گواري
- Village
- Location within Iran
- Coordinates: 28°41′32″N 58°55′08″E
- Country: Iran
- Province: Kerman
- County: Rigan
- Bakhsh: Gonbaki
- Rural District: Gonbaki

Population (2006)
  - Total: 506
- Time zone: UTC+3:30 (IRST)
  - Summer (DST): UTC+4:30 (IRDT)

Moradabad-e Chahgavari (Persian: مراداباد چه گواري, also Romanized as Morādābād-e Chahgavārī; also known as Morādābād and Morādābād-e Chegūrī) is a village in Gonbaki Rural District, Gonbaki District, Rigan County, Kerman Province, Iran. At the 2006 census, its population was 506, in 94 families.
