= Baba Jan-e Palizi =

Baba Jan-e Palizi باباجان پاليزي
- Village
- Location within Iran
- Coordinates: 34°23′09″N 46°58′10″E
- Country: Iran
- Province: Kermanshah
- County: Kermanshah
- Bakhsh: Central
- Rural District: Baladarband

Population (2006)
  - Total: 446
- Time zone: UTC+3:30 (IRST)
  - Summer (DST): UTC+4:30 (IRDT)

Baba Jan-e Palizi (Persian: باباجان پاليزي, also Romanized as Bābā Jān-e Pālīzī) is a village in Baladarband Rural District, in the Central District of Kermanshah County, Kermanshah Province, Iran. At the 2006 census, its population was 446, in 103 families.
