= Shah Qoli, Lorestan =

Shah Qoli شاه قلي
- Village
- Location within Iran
- Coordinates: 33°31′29″N 48°41′53″E
- Country: Iran
- Province: Lorestan
- County: Khorramabad
- Bakhsh: Zagheh
- Rural District: Zagheh

Population (2006)
  - Total: 102
- Time zone: UTC+3:30 (IRST)
  - Summer (DST): UTC+4:30 (IRDT)

Shah Qoli (Persian: شاه قلي, also Romanized as Shāh Qolī; also known as Shāhqolī) is a village in Zagheh Rural District, Zagheh District, Khorramabad County, Lorestan Province, Iran. At the 2006 census, its population was 102, in 27 families.
