= Moradabad-e Posht Rig =

Moradabad-e Posht Rig مراد اباد پشت ريگ
- Village
- Country: Iran
- Province: Kerman
- County: Fahraj
- Bakhsh: Negin Kavir
- Rural District: Chahdegal

Population (2006)
  - Total: 88
- Time zone: UTC+3:30 (IRST)
  - Summer (DST): UTC+4:30 (IRDT)

Moradabad-e Posht Rig (Persian: مراد اباد پشت ريگ, also Romanized as Morādābād-e Posht Rīg) is a village in Chahdegal Rural District, Negin Kavir District, Fahraj County, Kerman Province, Iran. At the 2006 census, its population was 88, in 17 families.
