= Nosratabad, Hamadan =

Nosratabad نصرت اباد
- Village
- Location within Iran
- Coordinates: 34°26′18″N 48°49′40″E
- Country: Iran
- Province: Hamadan
- County: Malayer
- Bakhsh: Jowkar
- Rural District: Jowkar

Population (2006)
  - Total: 89
- Time zone: UTC+3:30 (IRST)
  - Summer (DST): UTC+4:30 (IRDT)

Nosratabad (Persian: نصرت اباد, also Romanized as Noşratābād; also known as Ghal’eh Jowzan, Noşratābād-e Qūzān, Qal‘eh Qowzān, Qal‘eh Qūzān, and Qal‘eh-ye Qowzān) is a village in Jowkar Rural District, Jowkar District, Malayer County, Hamadan Province, Iran. At the 2006 census, its population was 89, in 21 families.
