= Nosratabad, Nehbandan =

Nosratabad نصرت اباد
- Village
- Location within Iran
- Coordinates: 31°27′57″N 60°43′33″E
- Country: Iran
- Province: South Khorasan
- County: Nehbandan
- Bakhsh: Central
- Rural District: Bandan

Population (2006)
  - Total: 26
- Time zone: UTC+3:30 (IRST)
  - Summer (DST): UTC+4:30 (IRDT)

Nosratabad (Persian: نصرت اباد, also Romanized as Noşratābād) is a village in Bandan Rural District, in the Central District of Nehbandan County, South Khorasan Province, Iran. At the 2006 census, its population was 26, in 6 families.
