= Hajji Morad, Kuhdasht =

Hajji Morad حاجي مراد
- Village
- Location within Iran
- Coordinates: 33°29′47″N 47°37′35″E
- Country: Iran
- Province: Lorestan
- County: Kuhdasht
- Bakhsh: Central
- Rural District: Kuhdasht-e Jonubi

Population (2006)
  - Total: 44
- Time zone: UTC+3:30 (IRST)
  - Summer (DST): UTC+4:30 (IRDT)

Hajji Morad (Persian: حاجي مراد, also Romanized as Ḩājjī Morād) is a village in Kuhdasht-e Jonubi Rural District, in the Central District of Kuhdasht County, Lorestan Province, Iran. At the 2006 census, its population was 44, in 10 families.
