= Nurabad, Lorestan =

City in Lorestan province, Iran

Nurabad Persian: نورآباد
- City
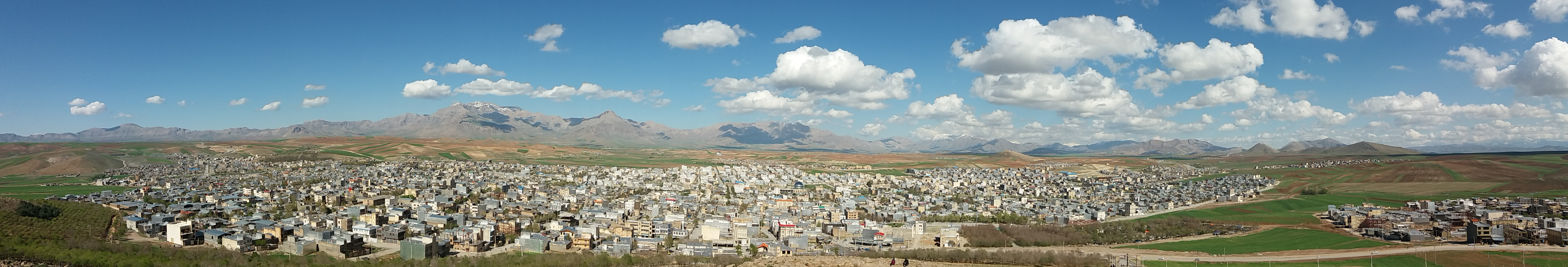

- Location within Iran
- Coordinates: 34°04′20″N 47°58′25″E
- Country: Iran
- Province: Lorestan
- County: Delfan
- District: Central

Population (2016)
  - Total: 65,547
- Time zone: UTC+3:30 (IRST)

Nurabad (Persian: نورآباد) (Note: Also romanized as Nūrābād) is a city in the Central District of Delfan County, Lorestan province, Iran, serving as capital of both the county and the district.

== Demographics ==
=== Language and ethnicity ===
The city is populated by Kurds. The linguistic composition of the city:

Nurabad linguistic composition (2022)
Language	percent
Kurdish	80%
Persian	20%

=== Population ===
At the time of the 2006 National Census, the city's population was 56,404 in 12,232 households. The following census in 2011 counted 61,142 people in 15,014 households. The 2016 census measured the population of the city as 65,547 people in 18,607 households.

== Climate ==
Nurabad has a dry-summer continental climate(Dsa) in Köppen climate classification with precipitation being higher in winter months than summer. Summers are dry and hot with very little precipitation from June to September. Winters are very cold and relatively wet.

Climate data for Nurabad (2000-2010, elevation:1859.1)
Month	Jan	Feb	Mar	Apr	May	Jun	Jul	Aug	Sep	Oct	Nov	Dec	Year
Daily mean °C (°F)	−1.2 (29.8)	1.1 (34.0)	6.7 (44.1)	10.4 (50.7)	14.7 (58.5)	20.4 (68.7)	24.2 (75.6)	24.2 (75.6)	19.8 (67.6)	14.5 (58.1)	6.9 (44.4)	2.1 (35.8)	12.0 (53.6)
Average precipitation mm (inches)	61.5 (2.42)	71.5 (2.81)	61.6 (2.43)	74.2 (2.92)	28.9 (1.14)	0.5 (0.02)	0.6 (0.02)	0.0 (0.0)	1.1 (0.04)	35.8 (1.41)	70.9 (2.79)	72.0 (2.83)	478.6 (18.83)
Source: IRIMO(temperature), (precipitation)

== 2025–2026 protests ==
Beginning on 28 December 2025, mass demonstrations erupted across multiple cities in Iran amid a deepening economic crisis and widespread dissatisfaction with the government. While initially sparked by frustration over skyrocketing inflation, rising food prices, and the severe depreciation of the Iranian rial, the protests quickly evolved into a broader movement demanding an end to the Islamic Republic's rule.

Hengaw Organization of Human Rights reported the killing of Ahad Ebrahimpour Abdoli on Thursday evening, 1 January 2025, a Lor man from Nurabad. He was fatally shot by the repressive forces of the Islamic Republic of Iran. According to eyewitnesses, he was struck by three bullets, one of which hit his heart, causing his death. Sources familiar with the case report that Ebrahimpour Abdoli was shot while attempting to help a woman whom Iranian government forces were trying to arrest.
