= Moradabad, Kermanshah =

Moradabad مراداباد
- Neighbourhood
- Location within Iran
- Coordinates: 34°19′35″N 47°07′39″E
- Country: Iran
- Province: Kermanshah
- County: Kermanshah
- Bakhsh: Central

Population (2006)
  - Total: 224
- Time zone: UTC+3:30 (IRST)

Moradabad (Persian: مراداباد, also Romanized as Morādābād) is a Neighbourhood in Kermanshah, Iran. It was a village in Dorudfaraman Rural District, in the Central District of Kermanshah County, Kermanshah Province, Iran. At the 2006 census, its population was 224, in 49 families.
