= Moradabad-e Kolah Siah =

Moradabad-e Kolah Siah مرادابادكلاه سياه
- Village
- Location within Iran
- Coordinates: 29°49′35″N 51°51′36″E
- Country: Iran
- Province: Fars
- County: Shiraz
- Bakhsh: Arzhan
- Rural District: Dasht-e Arzhan

Population (2006)
  - Total: 35
- Time zone: UTC+3:30 (IRST)
  - Summer (DST): UTC+4:30 (IRDT)

Moradabad-e Kolah Siah (Persian: مرادابادكلاه سياه, also romanized as Morādābād-e Kolāh Sīāh; also known as Morādābād) is a village in Dasht-e Arzhan Rural District, Arzhan District, Shiraz County, Fars province, Iran. At the 2006 census, its population was 35, in 13 families.
