= Nosratabad, Sanandaj =

Nosratabad نصرت آباد
- Village
- Location within Iran
- Coordinates: 35°12′00″N 47°06′00″E
- Country: Iran
- Province: Kurdistan
- County: Sanandaj
- Bakhsh: Central
- Rural District: Naran

Population (2006)
  - Total: 101
- Time zone: UTC+3:30 (IRST)
  - Summer (DST): UTC+4:30 (IRDT)

Nosratabad (Persian: نصرت آباد, also Romanized as Noşratābād) is a village in Naran Rural District, in the Central District of Sanandaj County, Kurdistan Province, Iran. At the 2006 census, its population was 101, in 20 families. The village is populated by Kurds.
