= Moradabad, Firuzabad, Selseleh =

Moradabad مرادآباد
- Village
- Location within Iran
- Coordinates: 33°54′18″N 48°08′18″E
- Country: Iran
- Province: Lorestan
- County: Selseleh
- Bakhsh: Firuzabad
- Rural District: Firuzabad

Population (2006)
  - Total: 83
- Time zone: UTC+3:30 (IRST)
  - Summer (DST): UTC+4:30 (IRDT)

Moradabad (Persian: مرادآباد, also Romanized as Morādābād) is a village in Firuzabad Rural District, Firuzabad District, Selseleh County, Lorestan Province, Iran. At the 2006 census, its population was 83, in 22 families.
