= Nosratabad, Tabriz =

Nosratabad نصرت اباد
- Village
- Location within Iran
- Coordinates: 38°26′15″N 46°22′59″E
- Country: Iran
- Province: East Azerbaijan
- County: Tabriz
- Bakhsh: Central
- Rural District: Esperan

Population (2006)
  - Total: 220
- Time zone: UTC+3:30 (IRST)
  - Summer (DST): UTC+4:30 (IRDT)

Nosratabad (Persian: نصرت اباد, also Romanized as Noşratābād; also known as Qarah Qūzī) is a village in Esperan Rural District, in the Central District of Tabriz County, East Azerbaijan Province, Iran. At the 2006 census, its population was 220, in 50 families.
