= Nazarabad-e Olya =

Nazarabad-e Olya نظرابادعليا
- Village
- Location within Iran
- Coordinates: 34°25′04″N 46°58′29″E
- Country: Iran
- Province: Kermanshah
- County: Kermanshah
- Bakhsh: Central
- Rural District: Baladarband

Population (2006)
  - Total: 39
- Time zone: UTC+3:30 (IRST)
  - Summer (DST): UTC+4:30 (IRDT)

Nazarabad-e Olya (Persian: نظرابادعليا, also Romanized as Naz̧arābād-e ‘Olyā; also known as Naz̧arābād-e Bālā) is a village in Baladarband Rural District, in the Central District of Kermanshah County, Kermanshah Province, Iran. At the 2006 census, its population was 39, in 10 families.
