= Nazarabad-e Eftekhar =

Nazarabad-e Eftekhar نظرابادافتخار
- Village
- Location within Iran
- Coordinates: 37°29′10″N 45°12′40″E
- Country: Iran
- Province: West Azerbaijan
- County: Urmia
- Bakhsh: Central
- Rural District: Torkaman

Population (2006)
  - Total: 151
- Time zone: UTC+3:30 (IRST)
  - Summer (DST): UTC+4:30 (IRDT)

Nazarabad-e Eftekhar (Persian: نظرابادافتخار, also Romanized as Naz̧arābād-e Eftekhār; also known as Naz̧arābād) is a village in Torkaman Rural District, in the Central District of Urmia County, West Azerbaijan Province, Iran. At the 2006 census, its population was 151, in 33 families.
