= Moradabad, Markazi =

Moradabad مراداباد
- Village
- Location within Iran
- Coordinates: 34°12′42″N 49°44′03″E
- Country: Iran
- Province: Markazi
- County: Arak
- Bakhsh: Central
- Rural District: Mashhad-e Miqan

Population (2006)
  - Total: 185
- Time zone: UTC+3:30 (IRST)
  - Summer (DST): UTC+4:30 (IRDT)

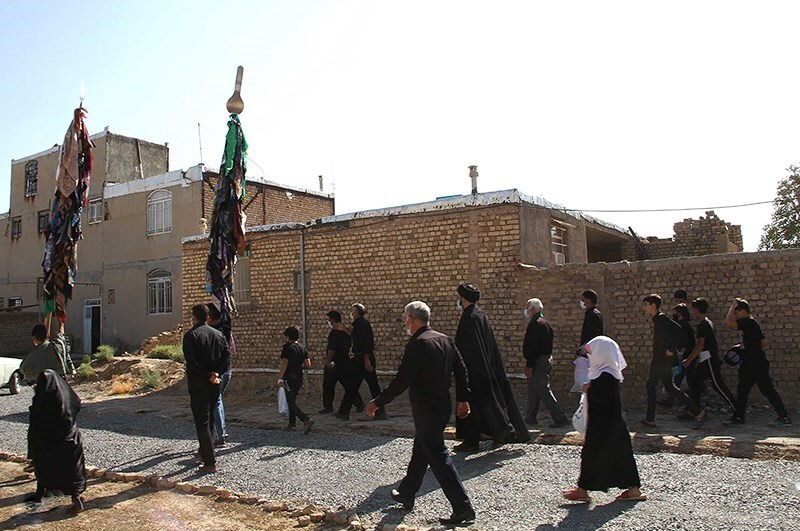

Moradabad (Persian: مراداباد, also Romanized as Morādābād; also known as Morādābād-e Meyqān, Morādābād-e Mīqān, Morād-e Mīghān, and Murādābād) is a village in Mashhad-e Miqan Rural District, in the Central District of Arak County, Markazi Province, Iran. At the 2006 census, its population was 185, in 53 families.
