= Nosratabad-e Laklar =

Nosratabad-e Laklar نصرت‌آباد لكلر
- Village
- Location within Iran
- Coordinates: 37°05′55″N 46°05′32″E
- Country: Iran
- Province: East Azerbaijan
- County: Malekan
- Bakhsh: Central
- Rural District: Gavdul-e Markazi

Population (2006)
  - Total: 676
- Time zone: UTC+3:30 (IRST)
  - Summer (DST): UTC+4:30 (IRDT)

Nosratabad-e Laklar (Persian: نصرت‌آباد لكلر, also Romanized as Noşratābād-e Laklar) is a village in Gavdul-e Markazi Rural District, in the Central District of Malekan County, East Azerbaijan Province, Iran. At the 2006 census, its population was 676, in 155 families.
