= Nosratabad Rural District =

Nosratabad Rural District (Persian: دهستان نصرت آباد) may refer to:

- Nosratabad Rural District (Qazvin Province)
- Nosratabad Rural District (Sistan and Baluchestan Province)
