= Nosratabad, Sirjan =

Nosratabad نصرت اباد
- Village
- Location within Iran
- Coordinates: 29°30′33″N 55°35′44″E
- Country: Iran
- Province: Kerman
- County: Sirjan
- Bakhsh: Central
- Rural District: Mahmudabad-e Seyyed

Population (2006)
  - Total: 2,102
- Time zone: UTC+3:30 (IRST)
  - Summer (DST): UTC+4:30 (IRDT)

Nosratabad (Persian: نصرت اباد, also Romanized as Noşratābād and Nasratābād) is a village in Mahmudabad-e Seyyed Rural District, in the Central District of Sirjan County, Kerman Province, Iran. At the 2006 census, its population was 2,102, in 523 families.
