= Nosratabad, Estabraq =

Nosratabad نصرت اباد
- Village
- Location within Iran
- Coordinates: 30°01′55″N 55°06′19″E
- Country: Iran
- Province: Kerman
- County: Shahr-e Babak
- Bakhsh: Central
- Rural District: Estabraq

Population (2006)
  - Total: 151
- Time zone: UTC+3:30 (IRST)
  - Summer (DST): UTC+4:30 (IRDT)

Nosratabad (Persian: نصرت اباد, also romanized as Noşratābād) is a village in Estabraq Rural District, in the Central District of Shahr-e Babak County, Kerman Province, Iran. At the 2006 census, its population was 151, in 34 families.
