= Nəzərabad =

- Municipality
- Location within Azerbaijan
- Coordinates: 39°18′41″N 45°25′56″E
- Country: Azerbaijan
- Autonomous republic: Nakhchivan
- District: Babek

Population (2005)
  - Total: 1,064
- Time zone: UTC+4 (AZT)

Nəzərabad (also, Nazarabad and Damirzindan) is a village and municipality in the Babek District of Nakhchivan, Azerbaijan. It is located 23 km in the north from the district center, on the plain. Its population is busy with grain-growing, vegetable-growing, farming and animal husbandry. There are secondary school, club, library, mosque and a medical center in the village. It has a population of 1,064. The Meydantepe settlement of the medieval ages was registered in the north of the village, in the near of the Nakhchivan-Shahbuz highway.

== Etymology ==
The former name of the Nəzərabad village has been Dəmirzindan (name of the iron bridge). The settlement was established in the place named Damirzindan, at the result of the settled families which were forced to move from Daralayaz province. The name means "a village which belongs to Nazar".

== Historical and archaeological monuments ==
=== Meydantəpə ===
Meydantəpə (Meydantapa) - the ancient settlement in the east of the Nəzərabad village in the Babak district, on the bank of the Nakhchivanchay River. Its area is about 10 hectares, thickness of cultural layer is approximately 4 meters in some places. The bottom layer belongs to the first Iron Age, and the top layer to the ancient period. The ancient pitcher graves have been found in Meydantapa. During the excavation have been found the fragments of the clay pot in pink and gray colored, iron product, stone labor tools from the Meydantapa. It is supposed that the Meydantapa belongs to the 1st millennium BC.

=== Nəzərabad Necropolis ===
Nəzərabad Necropolis - the archaeological monument of 14th-17th centuries in the west of the same named village of the Babak district, on the right side of the Nakhchivan-Shahbuz highway. It consists of the Muslim graves. There are monuments on the grave in tomb form. At the result of the searches have been found a number of examples of material culture.
