= Nosratabad, Kamyaran =

Nosratabad نصرت آباد
- Village
- Location within Iran
- Coordinates: 34°57′40″N 47°15′49″E
- Country: Iran
- Province: Kurdistan
- County: Kamyaran
- Bakhsh: Muchesh
- Rural District: Amirabad

Population (2006)
  - Total: 87
- Time zone: UTC+3:30 (IRST)
  - Summer (DST): UTC+4:30 (IRDT)

Nosratabad (Persian: نصرت آباد, also Romanized as Noşratābād; also known as Tāzehābād-e Gerger) is a village in Amirabad Rural District, Muchesh District, Kamyaran County, Kurdistan Province, Iran. At the 2006 census, its population was 87, in 15 families. The village is populated by Kurds.
