= Mirbag-e Shomali Rural District =

Rural district in Lorestan province, Iran

Mirbag-e Shomali Rural District Persian: دهستان میربگ شمالی
- Rural District
- Location within Iran
- Coordinates: 33°56′47″N 47°58′33″E
- Country: Iran
- Province: Lorestan
- County: Delfan
- District: Mirbag
- Established: 1987
- Capital: Masumabad

Population (2016)
  - Total: 12,608
- Time zone: UTC+3:30 (IRST)

Mirbag-e Shomali Rural District (Persian: دهستان میربگ شمالی) is in Mirbag District of Delfan County, Lorestan province, Iran. Its capital is the village of Masumabad. The previous capital of the rural district was the village of Farhadabad, now a neighborhood in the village of Mirbag.

== Demographics ==
=== Population ===
At the time of the 2006 National Census, the rural district's population (as a part of the Central District) was 13,085 in 2,766 households. There were 13,650 inhabitants in 3,283 households at the following census of 2011. The 2016 census measured the population of the rural district as 12,608 in 3,420 households. The most populous of its 46 villages was Farhadabad (now a neighborhood in the village of Mirbag), with 1,635 people.

In 2022, the rural district was separated from the district in the formation of Mirbag District.

=== Other villages in the rural district ===
- Abbasabad-e Kani Kabud
- Abdolabad-e Kani Kabud
- Ahmadvand
- Asadabad-e Chenar
- Cheshmeh Kabud
- Darbid-e Zangivand
- Dimandul
- Fathiabad-e Chaleh Chaleh
- Fattahabad
- Gorg Aliabad
- Gowhar Gush
- Hasanabad Bey Baba
- Hatamabad
- Hemmatabad
- Jafarabad-e Bala
- Jafarabad-e Pain
- Karamabad
- Kazemabad
- Mohammad Shahabad
- Moradabad-e Gol Gol
- Moradabad-e Mirakhur
- Nazarabad
- Nosratabad-e Olya
- Nosratabad-e Sofla
- Nowruzabad
- Ramazanabad
- Sardarabad
- Shahrak-e Emam Khomeyni
- Sheykhabad Sheykheh
- Sohbatabad
- Sohrababad
- Varmeleh
- Yar Hoseynabad
- Yarabad Mirbeyg
- Zaliabad
- Zaliabad Yarnazar
