= Fattahabad, Kurdistan =

Fattahabad فتاح آباد
- Village
- Location within Iran
- Coordinates: 36°04′24″N 46°51′16″E
- Country: Iran
- Province: Kurdistan
- County: Divandarreh
- Bakhsh: Karaftu
- Rural District: Zarrineh

Population (2006)
  - Total: 221
- Time zone: UTC+3:30 (IRST)
  - Summer (DST): UTC+4:30 (IRDT)

Fattahabad (Persian: فتاح آباد, also romanized as Fattāḩābād and Fatāḩābād) is a village in Zarrineh Rural District, Karaftu District, Divandarreh County, Kurdistan Province, Iran. At the 2006 census, its population was 221, in 40 families. The village is populated by Kurds.
