= Hudul =

Hudul هودول
- Village
- Location within Iran
- Coordinates: 38°24′00″N 48°49′00″E
- Country: Iran
- Province: Gilan
- County: Astara
- Bakhsh: Central
- Rural District: Virmuni

Population (2006)
  - Total: 388
- Time zone: UTC+3:30 (IRST)
  - Summer (DST): UTC+4:30 (IRDT)

Hudul (Persian: هودول, also Romanized as Hūdūl; also known as Naz̧arābād) is a village in Virmuni Rural District, in the Central District of Astara County, Gilan Province, Iran. At the 2006 census, its population was 388, in 84 families.

== Language ==
Linguistic composition of the village.

Hudul linguistic composition
language	percent
Talysh	60%
Azerbaijani	40%
