= Ganjineh-ye Zaruni =

Ganjineh-ye Zaruni گنجينه ضروني
- Village
- Location within Iran
- Coordinates: 33°24′10″N 47°38′52″E
- Country: Iran
- Province: Lorestan
- County: Kuhdasht
- Bakhsh: Central
- Rural District: Kuhdasht-e Jonubi

Population (2006)
  - Total: 220
- Time zone: UTC+3:30 (IRST)
  - Summer (DST): UTC+4:30 (IRDT)

Ganjineh-ye Zaruni (Persian: گنجينه ضروني, also Romanized as Ganjīneh-ye Ẕarūnī; also known as Gajīneh, Ganjīneh, and Gūjīneh) is a village in Kuhdasht-e Jonubi Rural District, in the Central District of Kuhdasht County, Lorestan Province, Iran. At the 2006 census, its population was 220, in 44 families.
