= Moradabad, Faryab =

Moradabad مراداباد
- Village
- Location within Iran
- Coordinates: 28°09′52″N 57°18′35″E
- Country: Iran
- Province: Kerman
- County: Faryab
- Bakhsh: Central
- Rural District: Hur

Population (2006)
  - Total: 308
- Time zone: UTC+3:30 (IRST)
  - Summer (DST): UTC+4:30 (IRDT)

Moradabad (Persian: مراداباد, also Romanized as Morādābād; also known as Chāh-e Morādābād) is a village in Hur Rural District, in the Central District of Faryab County, Kerman Province, Iran. At the 2006 census, its population was 308, in 66 families.
