= Moradabad Nurali =

Village in Lorestan province, Iran

Moradabad Nurali Persian: مرادآباد نورعلي
- Village
- Location within Iran
- Coordinates: 34°02′02″N 48°00′23″E
- Country: Iran
- Province: Lorestan
- County: Delfan
- District: Central
- Rural District: Nurabad

Population (2016)
  - Total: 863
- Time zone: UTC+3:30 (IRST)

Moradabad Nurali (Persian: مرادآباد نورعلي) (Note: Also romanized as Morādābād Nūrʿalī; also known as Morādābād) is a village in Nurabad Rural District of the Central District in Delfan County, Lorestan province, Iran.

== Demographics ==
=== Population ===
At the time of the 2006 National Census, the village's population was 866 in 172 households. The following census in 2011 counted 900 people in 219 households. The 2016 census measured the population of the village as 863 people in 245 households.
