= Babajan, Lorestan =

Village in Lorestan province, Iran

Babajan Persian: باباجان
- Village
- Location within Iran
- Coordinates: 34°01′25″N 47°56′08″E
- Country: Iran
- Province: Lorestan
- County: Delfan
- District: Central
- Rural District: Nurabad

Population (2016)
  - Total: 678
- Time zone: UTC+3:30 (IRST)

Babajan (Persian: باباجان) (Note: Also romanized as Bābājān; also known as Bābā Jān-e Zarrābī and Bābākhān) is a village in Nurabad Rural District of the Central District in Delfan County, Lorestan province, Iran.

== Demographics ==
=== Population ===
At the time of the 2006 National Census, the village's population was 663 in 151 households. The following census in 2011 counted 740 people in 190 households. The 2016 census measured the population of the village as 678 people in 191 households.
