= Nazarabad, Kerman =

Nazarabad نظراباد
- Village
- Location within Iran
- Coordinates: 28°59′03″N 58°50′27″E
- Country: Iran
- Province: Kerman
- County: Narmashir
- Bakhsh: Central
- Rural District: Posht Rud

Population (2006)
  - Total: 306
- Time zone: UTC+3:30 (IRST)
  - Summer (DST): UTC+4:30 (IRDT)

Nazarabad (Persian: نظراباد, also Romanized as Naz̧arābād; also known as Naz̧ābād) is a village in Posht Rud Rural District, in the Central District of Narmashir County, Kerman Province, Iran. At the 2006 census, its population was 306, in 86 families. Nazarabad is most well known as an agricultural town. The only other significant thing is a small school established by the Red Cross.
