= Nosratabad, Delfan =

Nosratabad نصرت آباد
- Village
- Location within Iran
- Coordinates: 34°12′10″N 47°45′33″E
- Country: Iran
- Province: Lorestan
- County: Delfan
- Bakhsh: Kakavand
- Rural District: Kakavand-e Sharqi

Population (2006)
  - Total: 251
- Time zone: UTC+3:30 (IRST)
  - Summer (DST): UTC+4:30 (IRDT)

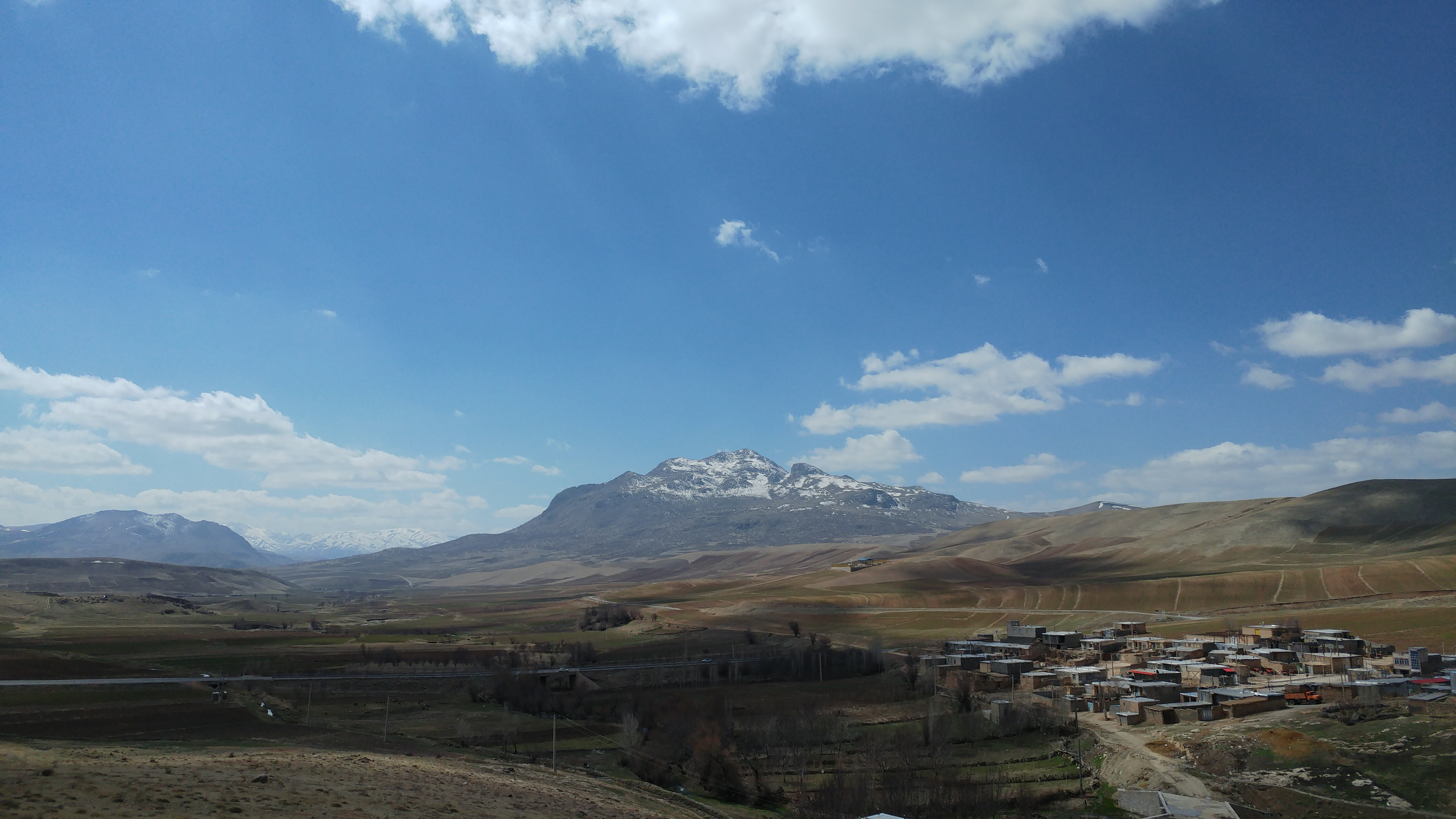

Nosratabad (Persian: نصرت آباد, also Romanized as Noşratābād) is a village in Kakavand-e Sharqi Rural District, Kakavand District, Delfan County, Lorestan Province, Iran. At the 2006 census, its population was 251, in 47 families.
