= Nurabad Rural District (Delfan County) =

Rural district in Lorestan province, Iran

Nurabad Rural District Persian: دهستان نورآباد
- Rural District
- Location within Iran
- Coordinates: 34°02′N 47°56′E
- Country: Iran
- Province: Lorestan
- County: Delfan
- District: Central
- Established: 1990
- Capital: Zafarabad

Population (2016)
  - Total: 13,440
- Time zone: UTC+3:30 (IRST)

Nurabad Rural District (Persian: دهستان نورآباد) is in the Central District of Delfan County, Lorestan province, Iran. Its capital is the village of Zafarabad.

== Demographics ==
=== Population ===
At the time of the 2006 National Census, the rural district's population was 9,921 in 2,078 households. There were 11,795 inhabitants in 2,940 households at the following census of 2011. The 2016 census measured the population of the rural district as 13,440 in 3,689 households. The most populous of its 48 villages was Khalifehabad, with 1,864 people.

=== Other villages in the rural district ===
- Babajan
- Cheshmeh Khani
- Karamabad
- Kazemabad
- Moradabad Nurali
- Sarab-e Ahmadvand
