= Mirbag District =

District in Lorestan province, Iran

Mirbag District Persian: بخش میربگ
- District
- Location within Iran
- Coordinates: 33°56′N 47°53′E
- Country: Iran
- Province: Lorestan
- County: Delfan
- Established: 2022
- Capital: Mirbag
- Time zone: UTC+3:30 (IRST)

Mirbag District (Persian: بخش میربگ) is in Delfan County, Lorestan province, Iran. Its capital is the village of Mirbag.

== History ==
In 2022, Mirbag-e Jonubi and Mirbag-e Shomali Rural Districts were separated from the Central District in the formation of Mirbag District.

== Demographics ==
=== Administrative divisions ===
Mirbag District
Administrative Divisions
Mirbag-e Jonubi RD
Mirbag-e Shomali RD
RD = Rural District
