= Central District (Delfan County) =

District in Lorestan province, Iran

Central District (Delfan County) Persian: بخش مرکزی شهرستان دلفان
- District
- Location within Iran
- Coordinates: 34°06′N 47°57′E
- Country: Iran
- Province: Lorestan
- County: Delfan
- Established: 1989
- Capital: Nurabad

Population (2016)
  - Total: 104,533
- Time zone: UTC+3:30 (IRST)

The Central District of Delfan County (Persian: بخش مرکزی شهرستان دلفان) is in Lorestan province, Iran. Its capital is the city of Nurabad.

== History ==
In 2013, Khaveh-ye Jonubi and Khaveh-ye Shomali Rural Districts were separated from the district in the formation of Khaveh District. In 2022, Mirbag-e Jonubi and Mirbag-e Shomali Rural Districts were separated from the Central District in forming Mirbag District.

== Demographics ==
=== Population ===
At the time of the 2006 National Census, the district's population was 113,787 in 24,683 households. The following census in 2011 counted 122,324 people in 30,447 households. The 2016 census measured the population of the district as 104,533 inhabitants in 29,291 households.

=== Administrative divisions ===
Central District (Delfan County) Population
Administrative Divisions	2006	2011	2016
Khaveh-ye Jonubi RD (Note: Transferred to Khaveh District)	12,419	12,977	
Khaveh-ye Shomali RD	8,149	8,730	
Mirbag-e Jonubi RD (Note: Transferred to Mirbag District after the 2016 census)	6,636	6,639	5,819
Mirbag-e Shomali RD	13,085	13,650	12,608
Nurabad RD	9,921	11,795	13,440
Nurali RD	7,173	7,391	7,119
Nurabad (city)	56,404	61,142	65,547
Total	113,787	122,324	104,533
RD = Rural District
