= Sefid Khani =

Sefid Khani or Safid Khani (Persian: سفیدخانی) may refer to:

== East Azerbaijan Province ==
- Sefid Khani, East Azerbaijan, a village in Meyaneh County

== Gilan Province ==
- Sefid Khani, Gilan, a village in Shaft County

== Hamadan Province ==
- Sefid Khani, Hamadan, a village in Nahavand County

== Ilam Province ==
- Sefid Khani-ye Olya, a village in Shirvan and Chardaval County, Ilam Province, Iran
- Sefid Khani-ye Sofla, a village in Shirvan and Chardaval County, Ilam Province, Iran
- Sefid Khani-ye Vosta, a village in Shirvan and Chardaval County, Ilam Province, Iran

== Kerman Province ==
- Sefid Khani, Kerman, a village in Baft County

== Kermanshah Province ==
- Sefid Khani, Kermanshah, a village in Sahneh County

== Lorestan Province ==
- Sefid Khani, Delfan, a village in Delfan County, Lorestan Province, Iran
- Sefid Khani Ahmedvand, a village in Delfan County, Lorestan Province, Iran
- Sefid Khani-ye Kuchek, a village in Delfan County, Lorestan Province, Iran
- Sefid Khani, Kuhdasht, a village in Kuhdasht County, Lorestan Province, Iran
- Sefid Khani-ye Jadid, a village in Kuhdasht County, Lorestan Province, Iran
