= Burbur =

Burbur may refer to:

- Tuone Udaina (d. 1898), last speaker of Dalmatian, nicknamed Burbur
- Burbur, a Lur tribe
- Burbur, Hamadan, a village in Hamadan Province, Iran
- Burbur, Kermanshah, a village in Kermanshah Province, Iran
- Burbur, Eslamabad-e Gharb, a village in Kermanshah Province, Iran
- Burbur, North Khorasan, a village in North Khorasan Province, Iran
- Burbur Tappeh, a village in Golestan Province, Iran
- Burbur, West Azerbaijan, a village in West Azerbaijan Province, Iran
- Burbur-e Olya, a village in Lorestan Province, Iran
- Burbur-e Sofla, a village in Lorestan Province, Iran
- Burbur-e Vosta, a village in Lorestan Province, Iran

== See also ==
- Burbure, a commune in the Hauts-de-France region, France
