= Daramrud =

Daramrud (Persian: دارامرود) may refer to:

- Daramrud-e Olya, Kermanshah Province
- Daramrud-e Sofla, Kermanshah Province
- Daramrud, Kurdistan
- Daramrud, Lorestan
- Daramrud, alternate name of Tazehabad, Delfan, Lorestan Province

== See also ==
- Daram Rud (disambiguation)
