= Posht Meleh =

Posht Meleh (Persian: پشتمله) may refer to:

- Posht Meleh, Khorramabad
- Posht Meleh, Bayravand

== See also ==
- Posht-e Meleh Sangar
