= Seyyed Ali =

Seyyed Ali (Persian: سيدعلي) may refer to:

- Seyyed Ali, East Azerbaijan
- Seyyed Ali, Khuzestan
- Seyyed Ali, Lorestan (disambiguation)

- Seyyed Ali, Delfan
- Seyyed Ali, Kakavand

- Seyyed Ali-ye Kiasoltan, Mazandaran Province
- Seyyed Ali, South Khorasan
