= Kamaneh =

Kamaneh (Persian: كمانه) may refer to:

- Kamaneh, Lorestan
- Kamaneh-ye Mirzabeygi, Lorestan Province
- Kamaneh, West Azerbaijan
- Khamaneh, East Azerbaijan Province
