= Golgiyi =

Golgiyi گلگيي
- Village
- Location within Iran
- Coordinates: 34°17′09″N 47°46′16″E
- Country: Iran
- Province: Lorestan
- County: Delfan
- Bakhsh: Kakavand
- Rural District: Kakavand-e Sharqi

Population (2006)
  - Total: 84
- Time zone: UTC+3:30 (IRST)
  - Summer (DST): UTC+4:30 (IRDT)

Golgiyi (Persian: گلگيي, also Romanized as Golgīyī; also known as Gol Gīn, Golgīn, Golgīnī, and Gulgīn) is a village in Kakavand-e Sharqi Rural District, Kakavand District, Delfan County, Lorestan Province, Iran. At the 2006 census, its population was 84, in 20 families.
