= Tarikeh-ye Rangrazan =

Village in Lorestan province, Iran

Tarikeh-ye Rangrazan Persian: تاريكه رنگرزان
- Village
- Location within Iran
- Country: Iran
- Province: Lorestan
- County: Delfan
- District: Itivand
- Rural District: Itivand-e Jonubi

Population (2016)
  - Total: 71
- Time zone: UTC+3:30 (IRST)

Tarikeh-ye Rangrazan (Persian: تاريكه رنگرزان) (Note: Also romanized as Tārīkeh-ye Rangrazān; also known as Taḩrīkeh) is a village in Itivand-e Jonubi Rural District of Itivand District in Delfan County, Lorestan province, Iran.

== Demographics ==
=== Population ===
At the time of the 2006 National Census, the village's population was 94 in 21 households, when it was in Kakavand District. The following census in 2011 counted 67 people in 14 households. The 2016 census measured the population of the village as 71 people in 17 households.

In 2022, the rural district was separated from the district in the formation of Itivand District.
