= Azizabad, Itivand =

Village in Lorestan province, Iran

Azizabad Persian: عزيزاباد
- Village
- Location within Iran
- Coordinates: 34°09′59″N 47°52′52″E
- Country: Iran
- Province: Lorestan
- County: Delfan
- District: Itivand
- Rural District: Itivand-e Shomali

Population (2016)
  - Total: 52
- Time zone: UTC+3:30 (IRST)

Azizabad (Persian: عزيزاباد) (Note: Also romanized as ‘Azīzābād) is a village in Itivand-e Shomali Rural District of Itivand District in Delfan County, Lorestan province, Iran.

== Demographics ==
=== Population ===
At the time of the 2006 National Census, the village's population was 105 in 21 households, when it was in Kakavand District. The following census in 2011 counted 93 people in 26 households. The 2016 census measured the population of the village as 52 people in 17 households.

In 2022, the rural district was separated from the district in the formation of Itivand District.
