= Telih =

Village in Lorestan province, Iran

Telih Persian: تليه
- Village
- Location within Iran
- Coordinates: 34°13′42″N 47°39′32″E
- Country: Iran
- Province: Lorestan
- County: Delfan
- District: Itivand
- Rural District: Itivand-e Jonubi

Population (2016)
  - Total: 38
- Time zone: UTC+3:30 (IRST)

Telih (Persian: تليه) (Note: Also romanized as Telīh; also known as Teliab) is a village in Itivand-e Jonubi Rural District of Itivand District in Delfan County, Lorestan province, Iran.

== Demographics ==
=== Population ===
At the time of the 2006 National Census, the village's population was 38 in eight households, when it was in Kakavand District. The following census in 2011 counted 39 people in nine households. The 2016 census measured the population of the village as 38 people in nine households.

In 2022, the rural district was separated from the district in the formation of Itivand District.
