= Mamulah =

Mamulah معموله
- Village
- Location within Iran
- Coordinates: 34°16′33″N 47°47′07″E
- Country: Iran
- Province: Lorestan
- County: Delfan
- Bakhsh: Kakavand
- Rural District: Kakavand-e Sharqi

Population (2006)
  - Total: 63
- Time zone: UTC+3:30 (IRST)
  - Summer (DST): UTC+4:30 (IRDT)

Mamulah (Persian: معموله, also Romanized as Mamūlah) is a village in Kakavand-e Sharqi Rural District, Kakavand District, Delfan County, Lorestan Province, Iran. At the 2006 census, its population was 63, in 12 families.
