= Qetel Yum =

Village in Lorestan province, Iran

Qetel Yum Persian: قتل يوم
- Village
- Country: Iran
- Province: Lorestan
- County: Delfan
- District: Itivand
- Rural District: Itivand-e Shomali

Population (2016)
  - Total: 36
- Time zone: UTC+3:30 (IRST)

Qetel Yum (Persian: قتل يوم) (Note: Also romanized as Qetel Yūm) is a village in Itivand-e Shomali Rural District of Itivand District in Delfan County, Lorestan province, Iran.

== Demographics ==
=== Population ===
At the time of the 2006 National Census, the village's population was 33 in four households, when it was in Kakavand District. The following census in 2011 counted 29 people in six households. The 2016 census measured the population of the village as 36 people in 10 households.

In 2022, the rural district was separated from the district in the formation of Itivand District.
