= Kanak Serakh Darab Pir =

Kanak Serakh Darab Pir کنک سرخ داراب پير
- Village
- Location within Iran
- Coordinates: 34°06′15″N 47°35′11″E
- Country: Iran
- Province: Lorestan
- County: Delfan
- Bakhsh: Kakavand
- Rural District: Kakavand-e Gharbi

Population (2006)
  - Total: 115
- Time zone: UTC+3:30 (IRST)
  - Summer (DST): UTC+4:30 (IRDT)

Kanak Serakh Darab Pir (Persian: کنک سرخ داراب پير, also Romanized as Kanak Serakh Dārāb Pīr; also known as Dārāb Pīr) is a village in Kakavand-e Gharbi Rural District, Kakavand District, Delfan County, Lorestan Province, Iran. At the 2006 census, its population was 115, in 20 families.
