= Khalilabad, Delfan =

Village in Lorestan province, Iran

Khalilabad Persian: خليل اباد
- Village
- Location within Iran
- Coordinates: 34°01′36″N 47°33′13″E
- Country: Iran
- Province: Lorestan
- County: Delfan
- District: Itivand
- Rural District: Itivand-e Jonubi

Population (2016)
  - Total: 110
- Time zone: UTC+3:30 (IRST)

Khalilabad (Persian: خليل اباد) (Note: Also romanized as Khalīlābād) is a village in Itivand-e Jonubi Rural District of Itivand District in Delfan County, Lorestan province, Iran.

== Demographics ==
=== Population ===
At the time of the 2006 National Census, the village's population was 104 in 21 households, when it was in Kakavand District. The following census in 2011 counted 171 people in 38 households. The 2016 census measured the population of the village as 110 people in 30 households.

In 2022, the rural district was separated from the district in the formation of Itivand District.
