= Zamgah Zich =

Village in Lorestan province, Iran

Zamgah Zich Persian: زمگه زيچ
- Village
- Country: Iran
- Province: Lorestan
- County: Delfan
- District: Itivand
- Rural District: Itivand-e Jonubi

Population (2016)
  - Total: 0
- Time zone: UTC+3:30 (IRST)

Zamgah Zich (Persian: زمگه زيچ) (Note: Also romanized as Zamgah Zīch) is a village in Itivand-e Jonubi Rural District of Itivand District in Delfan County, Lorestan province, Iran.

== Demographics ==
=== Population ===
At the time of the 2006 National Census, the village's population was 24 in five households, when it was in Kakavand District. The 2016 census measured the population of the village as zero.

In 2022, the rural district was separated from the district in the formation of Itivand District.
