= Jafarabad, Delfan =

Village in Lorestan province, Iran

Jafarabad Persian: جعفرآباد
- Village
- Location within Iran
- Coordinates: 33°55′57″N 47°39′55″E
- Country: Iran
- Province: Lorestan
- County: Delfan
- District: Itivand
- Rural District: Itivand-e Jonubi

Population (2016)
  - Total: 55
- Time zone: UTC+3:30 (IRST)

Jafarabad (Persian: جعفرآباد) (Note: Also romanized as Ja‘farābād; also known as Varn Shākh (ورن شاخ)) is a village in Itivand-e Jonubi Rural District of Itivand District in Delfan County, Lorestan province, Iran.

== Demographics ==
=== Population ===
At the time of the 2006 National Census, the village's population was 128 in 22 households, when it was in Kakavand District. The following census in 2011 counted 164 people in 33 households. The 2016 census measured the population of the village as 55 people in 11 households.

In 2022, the rural district was separated from the district in the formation of Itivand District.
