= Sarzan =

Village in Lorestan province, Iran

Sarzan Persian: سرزن
- Village
- Location within Iran
- Coordinates: 34°07′28″N 47°45′56″E
- Country: Iran
- Province: Lorestan
- County: Delfan
- District: Itivand
- Rural District: Itivand-e Shomali

Population (2016)
  - Total: 78
- Time zone: UTC+3:30 (IRST)

Sarzan (Persian: سرزن) is a village in Itivand-e Shomali Rural District of Itivand District in Delfan County, Lorestan province, Iran.

== Demographics ==
=== Population ===
At the time of the 2006 National Census, the village's population was 135 in 23 households, when it was in Kakavand District. The following census in 2011 counted 100 people in 22 households. The 2016 census measured the population of the village as 78 people in 21 households.

In 2022, the rural district was separated from the district in the formation of Itivand District.
