= Valiabad Khosrow Khani =

Village in Lorestan province, Iran

Valiabad Khosrow Khani Persian: ولي ابادخسروخاني
- Village
- Country: Iran
- Province: Lorestan
- County: Delfan
- District: Itivand
- Rural District: Itivand-e Shomali

Population (2016)
  - Total: 28
- Time zone: UTC+3:30 (IRST)

Valiabad Khosrow Khani (Persian: ولي ابادخسروخاني) (Note: Also romanized as Valīābād Khosrow Khānī) is a village in Itivand-e Shomali Rural District of Itivand District in Delfan County, Lorestan province, Iran.

== Demographics ==
=== Population ===
At the time of the 2006 National Census, the village's population was 35 in five households, when it was in Kakavand District. The following census in 2011 counted 38 people in nine households. The 2016 census measured the population of the village as 28 people in eight households.

In 2022, the rural district was separated from the district in the formation of Itivand District.
