= Cham Karim =

Village in Lorestan province, Iran

Cham Karim Persian: چم كريم
- Village
- Location within Iran
- Coordinates: 34°05′39″N 47°41′23″E
- Country: Iran
- Province: Lorestan
- County: Delfan
- District: Itivand
- Rural District: Itivand-e Jonubi

Population (2016)
  - Total: 84
- Time zone: UTC+3:30 (IRST)

Cham Karim (Persian: چم كريم) (Note: Also romanized as Cham Karīm and Cham-e Karīm; also known as Chamkārī) is a village in Itivand-e Jonubi Rural District of Itivand District in Delfan County, Lorestan province, Iran.

== Demographics ==
=== Population ===
At the time of the 2006 National Census, the village's population was 139 in 29 households, when it was in Kakavand District. The following census in 2011 counted 103 people in 39 households. The 2016 census measured the population of the village as 84 people in 25 households.

In 2022, the rural district was separated from the district in the formation of Itivand District.
