= Chafteh Darreh =

Chafteh Darreh (Persian: چفته دره) may refer to:

- Chafteh Darreh-ye Olya
- Chafteh Darreh-ye Sofla
- Chafteh Darreh-ye Vosta
