= Pain Ab =

Pain Ab (Persian: پايين آب) may refer to:

- Pain Ab-e Olya
- Pain Ab-e Sofla Sharqi
