= Ahangaran, Delfan =

Village in Lorestan province, Iran

Ahangaran Persian: آهنگران
- Village
- Location within Iran
- Country: Iran
- Province: Lorestan
- County: Delfan
- District: Itivand
- Rural District: Itivand-e Shomali

Population (2016)
  - Total: 37
- Time zone: UTC+3:30 (IRST)

Ahangaran (Persian: اهنگران عليا) (Note: Also romanized as Āhangarān; formerly known as Ahangaran-e Olya (اهنگران عليا), also romanized as Āhangarān-e ‘Olyā) is a village in Itivand-e Shomali Rural District of Itivand District in Delfan County, Lorestan province, Iran.

== Demographics ==
=== Population ===
At the time of the 2006 National Census, the village's population, as Ahangaran-e Olya, was 139 in 35 households, when it was in Kakavand District. The following census in 2011 counted 100 people in 28 households, by which time the village was listed as Ahangaran. The 2016 census measured the population of the village as 37 people in 11 households.

In 2022, the rural district was separated from the district in the formation of Itivand District.
