= Gavdaneh Pa =

Village in Lorestan province, Iran

Gavdaneh Pa Persian: گاودانه پا
- Village
- Location within Iran
- Coordinates: 34°02′31″N 47°35′11″E
- Country: Iran
- Province: Lorestan
- County: Delfan
- District: Itivand
- Rural District: Itivand-e Jonubi

Population (2016)
  - Total: 26
- Time zone: UTC+3:30 (IRST)

Gavdaneh Pa (Persian: گاودانه پا) (Note: Also romanized as Gāvdāneh Pā) is a village in Itivand-e Jonubi Rural District of Itivand District in Delfan County, Lorestan province, Iran.

== Demographics ==
=== Population ===
At the time of the 2006 National Census, the village's population was 41 in eight households, when it was in Kakavand District. The following census in 2011 counted 39 people in seven households. The 2016 census measured the population of the village as 26 people in seven households.

In 2022, the rural district was separated from the district in the formation of Itivand District.
