= Heydarik =

Village in Lorestan province, Iran

Heydarik Persian: حيدريك
- Village
- Country: Iran
- Province: Lorestan
- County: Delfan
- District: Itivand
- Rural District: Itivand-e Jonubi

Population (2016)
  - Total: 34
- Time zone: UTC+3:30 (IRST)

Heydarik (Persian: حيدريك) (Note: Also romanized as Heydarīḵ) is a village in Itivand-e Jonubi Rural District of Itivand District in Delfan County, Lorestan province, Iran.

== Demographics ==
=== Population ===
At the time of the 2006 National Census, the village's population was 42 in seven households, when it was in Kakavand District. The following census in 2011 counted 20 people in four households. The 2016 census measured the population of the village as 34 people in six households.

In 2022, the rural district was separated from the district in the formation of Itivand District.
