= Cheshmeh Zalikha =

Village in Lorestan province, Iran

Cheshmeh Zalikha Persian: چشمه زليخا
- Village
- Country: Iran
- Province: Lorestan
- County: Delfan
- District: Itivand
- Rural District: Itivand-e Jonubi

Population (2016)
  - Total: 43
- Time zone: UTC+3:30 (IRST)

Cheshmeh Zalikha (Persian: چشمه زليخا) (Note: Also romanized as Cheshmeh Zalīkhā) is a village in Itivand-e Jonubi Rural District of Itivand District in Delfan County, Lorestan province, Iran.

== Demographics ==
=== Population ===
At the time of the 2006 National Census, the village's population was 32 in six households, when it was in Kakavand District. The following census in 2011 counted 33 people in eight households. The 2016 census measured the population of the village as 43 people in nine households.

In 2022, the rural district was separated from the district in the formation of Itivand District.
