= Taqiabad-e Kan Kot =

Village in Lorestan province, Iran

Taqiabad-e Kan Kot Persian: تقی‌آباد کن‌کت
- Village
- Location within Iran
- Coordinates: 34°10′14″N 47°53′25″E
- Country: Iran
- Province: Lorestan
- County: Delfan
- District: Itivand
- Rural District: Itivand-e Shomali

Population (2016)
  - Total: 382
- Time zone: UTC+3:30 (IRST)

Taqiabad-e Kan Kot (Persian: تقی‌آباد کن‌کت) (Note: Also romanized as Taqīābād-e Kan Kot) is a village in, and the capital of, Itivand-e Shomali Rural District in Itivand District of Delfan County, Lorestan province, Iran.

== Demographics ==
=== Population ===
At the time of the 2006 National Census, the village's population was 194 in 32 households, when it was in Kakavand District. The following census in 2011 counted 201 people in 43 households. The 2016 census measured the population of the village as 382 people in 106 households, the most populous in its rural district.

In 2022, the rural district was separated from the district in the formation of Itivand District.
