= Heydarabad, Itivand-e Shomali =

Village in Lorestan province, Iran

Heydarabad Persian: حيدراباد
- Village
- Location within Iran
- Coordinates: 34°12′10″N 47°54′27″E
- Country: Iran
- Province: Lorestan
- County: Delfan
- District: Itivand
- Rural District: Itivand-e Shomali

Population (2016)
  - Total: 64
- Time zone: UTC+3:30 (IRST)

Heydarabad (Persian: حيدراباد) (Note: Also romanized as Ḩeydarābād; also known as Naurūzābād and Nowrūzābād) is a village in Itivand-e Shomali Rural District of Itivand District in Delfan County, Lorestan province, Iran.

== Demographics ==
=== Population ===
At the time of the 2006 National Census, the village's population was 128 in 27 households, when it was in Kakavand District. The following census in 2011 counted 109 people in 29 households. The 2016 census measured the population of the village as 64 people in 17 households.

In 2022, the rural district was separated from the district in the formation of Itivand District.
