= Cheshmeh Kalan =

Village in Lorestan province, Iran

Cheshmeh Kalan Persian: چشمه كلان
- Village
- Location within Iran
- Coordinates: 34°05′38″N 47°47′05″E
- Country: Iran
- Province: Lorestan
- County: Delfan
- District: Itivand
- Rural District: Itivand-e Jonubi

Population (2016)
  - Total: 27
- Time zone: UTC+3:30 (IRST)

Cheshmeh Kalan (Persian: چشمه كلان) (Note: Also romanized as Cheshmeh Kalān; also known as Kanī Kalān) is a village in Itivand-e Jonubi Rural District of Itivand District in Delfan County, Lorestan province, Iran.

== Demographics ==
=== Population ===
At the time of the 2006 National Census, the village's population was 20 in five households, when it was in Kakavand District. The following census in 2011 counted 31 people in eight households. The 2016 census measured the population of the village as 27 people in eight households.

In 2022, the rural district was separated from the district in the formation of Itivand District.
