= Almasabad, Delfan =

Village in Lorestan province, Iran

Almasabad Persian: الماس آباد
- Village
- Location within Iran
- Coordinates: 34°00′39″N 47°35′30″E
- Country: Iran
- Province: Lorestan
- County: Delfan
- District: Itivand
- Rural District: Itivand-e Jonubi

Population (2016)
  - Total: 0
- Time zone: UTC+3:30 (IRST)

Almasabad (Persian: الماس آباد) (Note: Also romanized as Almāsābād; formerly known as Almaskhan (الماس خان), also romanized as Almāskhān) is a village in Itivand-e Jonubi Rural District of Itivand District in Delfan County, Lorestan province, Iran.

== Demographics ==
=== Population ===
At the time of the 2006 National Census, the village's population, as Almaskhan, was 59 in nine households, when it was in Kakavand District. The following census in 2011 counted 45 people in seven households, by which time the village was listed as Almasabad. The 2016 census measured the population of the village as 166 people in 38 households.

In 2022, the rural district was separated from the district in the formation of Itivand District.
