= Tang-e Pari Olya =

Village in Lorestan province, Iran

Tang-e Pari Olya Persian: تنگپري عليا
- Village
- Location within Iran
- Coordinates: 34°04′10″N 47°45′14″E
- Country: Iran
- Province: Lorestan
- County: Delfan
- District: Itivand
- Rural District: Itivand-e Jonubi

Population (2016)
  - Total: 119
- Time zone: UTC+3:30 (IRST)

Tang-e Pari Olya (Persian: تنگپري عليا) (Note: Also romanized as Tang-e Parī ʿOlyā; also known as Tang-e Parī) is a village in Itivand-e Jonubi Rural District of Itivand District in Delfan County, Lorestan province, Iran.

== Demographics ==
=== Population ===
At the time of the 2006 National Census, the village's population was 156 in 29 households, when it was in Kakavand District. The following census in 2011 counted 139 people in 30 households. The 2016 census measured the population of the village as 119 people in 31 households.

In 2022, the rural district was separated from the district in the formation of Itivand District.
