= Kuleh Nab =

Village in Lorestan province, Iran

Kuleh Nab Persian: کوله ناب
- Village
- Country: Iran
- Province: Lorestan
- County: Delfan
- District: Itivand
- Rural District: Itivand-e Jonubi

Population (2016)
  - Total: 50
- Time zone: UTC+3:30 (IRST)

Kuleh Nab (Persian: کوله ناب) (Note: Also romanized as Kūleh Nāb; also known as Guleh Nav (گوله ناو), also romanized as Gūleh Nāv) is a village in Itivand-e Jonubi Rural District of Itivand District in Delfan County, Lorestan province, Iran.

== Demographics ==
=== Population ===
At the time of the 2006 National Census, the village's population was 106 in 15 households, when it was in Kakavand District. The following census in 2011 counted 33 people in nine households. The 2016 census measured the population of the village as 50 people in 12 households.

In 2022, the rural district was separated from the district in the formation of Itivand District.
