= Sarab-e Pirdusti =

Village in Lorestan province, Iran

Sarab-e Pirdusti Persian: سراب پيردوستي
- Village
- Location within Iran
- Coordinates: 34°09′27″N 47°51′52″E
- Country: Iran
- Province: Lorestan
- County: Delfan
- District: Itivand
- Rural District: Itivand-e Shomali

Population (2016)
  - Total: 226
- Time zone: UTC+3:30 (IRST)

Sarab-e Pirdusti (Persian: سراب پيردوستي) (Note: Also romanized as Sarāb-e Pīrdūstī) is a village in Itivand-e Shomali Rural District of Itivand District in Delfan County, Lorestan province, Iran.

== Demographics ==
=== Population ===
At the time of the 2006 National Census, the village's population was 103 in 21 households, when it was in Kakavand District. The following census in 2011 counted 196 people in 60 households. The 2016 census measured the population of the village as 226 people in 68 households.

In 2022, the rural district was separated from the district in the formation of Itivand District.
