= Khosrow Khani =

Khosrow Khani (Persian: خسروخاني) may refer to:

- Khosrow Khani, Delfan, Iran
- Khosrow Khani, Khorramabad, Iran

== See also ==
- Khosrow Khan (disambiguation)
