= Shelal-e Ali =

Village in Lorestan province, Iran

Shelal-e Ali Persian: شلال علي
- Village
- Location within Iran
- Coordinates: 34°11′14″N 47°51′55″E
- Country: Iran
- Province: Lorestan
- County: Delfan
- District: Itivand
- Rural District: Itivand-e Shomali

Population (2016)
  - Total: 35
- Time zone: UTC+3:30 (IRST)

Shelal-e Ali (Persian: شلال علي) (Note: Also romanized as Shelāl ‘Alī and Shelāl-e ‘Alī; also known as Shelalvand (شلالوند), also romanized as Shelālvand) is a village in Itivand-e Shomali Rural District of Itivand District in Delfan County, Lorestan province, Iran.

== Demographics ==
=== Population ===
At the time of the 2006 National Census, the village's population was 49 in 11 households, when it was in Kakavand District. The following census in 2011 counted 34 people in nine households. The 2016 census measured the population of the village as 35 people in eight households.

In 2022, the rural district was separated from the district in the formation of Itivand District.
