= Kulband =

Village in Lorestan province, Iran

Kulband Persian: كول بند
- Village
- Location within Iran
- Coordinates: 34°01′47″N 47°36′48″E
- Country: Iran
- Province: Lorestan
- County: Delfan
- District: Itivand
- Rural District: Itivand-e Jonubi

Population (2016)
  - Total: Below reporting threshold
- Time zone: UTC+3:30 (IRST)

Kulband (Persian: كول بند) (Note: Also romanized as Kūl Band and Kūlband) is a village in Itivand-e Jonubi Rural District of Itivand District in Delfan County, Lorestan province, Iran.

== Demographics ==
=== Population ===
At the time of the 2006 National Census, the village's population was 36 in six households, when it was in Kakavand District. The following census in 2011 counted 26 people in five households. The 2016 census measured the population of the village as below the reporting threshold.

In 2022, the rural district was separated from the district in the formation of Itivand District.
