= Dar Numeh =

Village in Lorestan province, Iran

Dar Numeh Persian: دارنومه
- Village
- Country: Iran
- Province: Lorestan
- County: Delfan
- District: Itivand
- Rural District: Itivand-e Jonubi

Population (2016)
  - Total: Below reporting threshold
- Time zone: UTC+3:30 (IRST)

Dar Numeh (Persian: دارنومه) (Note: Also romanized as Dār Nūmeh) is a village in Itivand-e Jonubi Rural District of Itivand District in Delfan County, Lorestan province, Iran.

== Demographics ==
=== Population ===
At the time of the 2006 National Census, the village's population was 39 in nine households, when it was in Kakavand District. The following censuses in 2011 and 2016 counted a population below the reporting threshold.

In 2022, the rural district was separated from the district in the formation of Itivand District.
