= Posht Tang-e Dustali =

Village in Lorestan province, Iran

Posht Tang-e Dustali Persian: پشتتنگدوستعلي
- Village
- Location within Iran
- Coordinates: 34°10′28″N 47°48′18″E
- Country: Iran
- Province: Lorestan
- County: Delfan
- District: Itivand
- Rural District: Itivand-e Shomali

Population (2016)
  - Total: 97
- Time zone: UTC+3:30 (IRST)

Posht Tang-e Dustali (Persian: پشتتنگدوستعلي) (Note: Also romanized as Posht-e Tang-e Dūst ‘Alī and Posht Tang-e Dūst‘alī) is a village in Itivand-e Shomali Rural District of Itivand District in Delfan County, Lorestan province, Iran.

== Demographics ==
=== Population ===
At the time of the 2006 National Census, the village's population was 107 in 22 households, when it was in Kakavand District. The following census in 2011 counted 101 people in 25 households. The 2016 census measured the population of the village as 97 people in 32 households.

In 2022, the rural district was separated from the district in the formation of Itivand District.
