= Salar Dul =

Village in Lorestan province, Iran

Salar Dul Persian: سالاردول
- Village
- Location within Iran
- Country: Iran
- Province: Lorestan
- County: Delfan
- District: Itivand
- Rural District: Itivand-e Jonubi

Population (2016)
  - Total: 19
- Time zone: UTC+3:30 (IRST)

Salar Dul (Persian: سالاردول) (Note: Also romanized as Salar Dool and Sālār Dūl; also known as Sālār Del) is a village in Itivand-e Jonubi Rural District of Itivand District in Delfan County, Lorestan province, Iran.

== Demographics ==
=== Population ===
At the time of the 2006 National Census, the village's population was 37 in seven households, when it was in Kakavand District. The following census in 2011 counted 19 people in five households. The 2016 census again measured the population of the village as 19 people in five households.

In 2022, the rural district was separated from the district in the formation of Itivand District.
