= Ahangaran-e Pain =

Village in Lorestan province, Iran

Ahangaran-e Pain Persian: آهنگران پايين
- Village
- Location within Iran
- Country: Iran
- Province: Lorestan
- County: Delfan
- District: Itivand
- Rural District: Itivand-e Shomali

Population (2016)
  - Total: 23
- Time zone: UTC+3:30 (IRST)

Ahangaran-e Pain (Persian: آهنگران پايين) (Note: Also romanized as Āhangarān-e Pā’īn; formerly known as Ahangaran-e Sofla (آهنگران سفلي), also romanized as Āhangarān-e Soflá; also known as Ebrāhīm Khān and Ebrahim Khani (ابراهيم خاني), also romanized as Ebrāhīm Khānī) is a village in Itivand-e Shomali Rural District of Itivand District in Delfan County, Lorestan province, Iran.

== Demographics ==
=== Population ===
At the time of the 2006 National Census, the village's population, as Ahangaran-e Sofla, was 37 in eight households, when it was in Kakavand District. The following census in 2011 counted 38 people in eight households, by which time the village was listed as Ahangaran-e Pain. The 2016 census measured the population of the village as 23 people in six households.

In 2022, the rural district was separated from the district in the formation of Itivand District.
