= Jafarkhan =

Jafarkhan (Persian: جعفرخان) may refer to:

- Jafarkhan, Kurdistan
- Jafarkhan, Lorestan
- Jafarkhan-e Zeytun
- Jafarkhan, alternate name of Jafarabad, Kuhdasht
