= Nazarabad, Itivand =

Village in Lorestan province, Iran

Nazarabad Persian: نظرآباد
- Village
- Country: Iran
- Province: Lorestan
- County: Delfan
- District: Itivand
- Rural District: Itivand-e Jonubi

Population (2016)
  - Total: 0
- Time zone: UTC+3:30 (IRST)

Nazarabad (Persian: نظرآباد) (Note: Also romanized as Naz̧arābād; formerly known as Nazar Khan (نظرخان), also romanized as Naẓar Khān) is a village in Itivand-e Jonubi Rural District of Itivand District in Delfan County, Lorestan province, Iran.

== Demographics ==
=== Population ===
At the time of the 2006 National Census, the village's population, as Nazar Khan, was 65 in 13 households, when it was in Kakavand District. The 2016 census measured the population of the village as zero, by which time it was listed as Nazarabad.

In 2022, the rural district was separated from the district in the formation of Itivand District.
