= Azadabad-e Pirdusti =

Village in Lorestan province, Iran

Azadabad-e Pirdusti Persian: آزادآباد پير دوستي
- Village
- Location within Iran
- Country: Iran
- Province: Lorestan
- County: Delfan
- District: Itivand
- Rural District: Itivand-e Shomali

Population (2016)
  - Total: 35
- Time zone: UTC+3:30 (IRST)

Azadabad-e Pirdusti (Persian: آزادآباد پير دوستي) (Note: Also romanized as Azadabad-e Pir Dusti, Āzādābād-e Pīr Dūstī, and Āzādābād-e Pīrdūstī; also known as Āzādābād) is a village in Itivand-e Shomali Rural District of Itivand District in Delfan County, Lorestan province, Iran.

== Demographics ==
=== Population ===
At the time of the 2006 National Census, the village's population was 31 in six households, when it was in Kakavand District. The following census in 2011 counted 25 people in six households. The 2016 census measured the population of the village as 35 people in 10 households.

In 2022, the rural district was separated from the district in the formation of Itivand District.
