= Jai Hatam =

Village in Lorestan province, Iran

Jai Hatam Persian: جاي حاتم
- Village
- Location within Iran
- Coordinates: 34°01′50″N 47°46′10″E
- Country: Iran
- Province: Lorestan
- County: Delfan
- District: Itivand
- Rural District: Itivand-e Jonubi

Population (2016)
  - Total: 161
- Time zone: UTC+3:30 (IRST)

Jai Hatam (Persian: جاي حاتم) (Note: Also romanized as Jāī Hātam) is a village in Itivand-e Jonubi Rural District of Itivand District in Delfan County, Lorestan province, Iran.

== Demographics ==
=== Population ===
At the time of the 2006 National Census, the village's population was 132 in 27 households, when it was in Kakavand District. The following census in 2011 counted 173 people in 36 households. The 2016 census measured the population of the village as 161 people in 45 households.

In 2022, the rural district was separated from the district in the formation of Itivand District.
