= Allah Beygi =

Village in Lorestan province, Iran

Allah Beygi Persian: لله بيگي
- Village
- Country: Iran
- Province: Lorestan
- County: Delfan
- District: Itivand
- Rural District: Itivand-e Jonubi

Population (2016)
  - Total: 53
- Time zone: UTC+3:30 (IRST)

Allah Beygi (Persian: لله بيگي) (Note: Also romanized as Allah Beygī) is a village in Itivand-e Jonubi Rural District of Itivand District in Delfan County, Lorestan province, Iran.

== Demographics ==
=== Population ===
At the time of the 2006 National Census, the village's population was 59 in 12 households, when it was in Kakavand District. The following census in 2011 counted 63 people in 13 households. The 2016 census measured the population of the village as 53 people in 11 households.

In 2022, the rural district was separated from the district in the formation of Itivand District.
