= Tazehabad Golestaneh =

Village in Lorestan province, Iran

Tazehabad Golestaneh Persian: تازه آباد گلستانه
- Village
- Country: Iran
- Province: Lorestan
- County: Delfan
- District: Itivand
- Rural District: Itivand-e Jonubi

Population (2016)
  - Total: 25
- Time zone: UTC+3:30 (IRST)

Tazehabad Golestaneh (Persian: تازه آباد گلستانه) (Note: Also romanized as Tāzehābād Golestāneh) is a village in Itivand-e Jonubi Rural District of Itivand District in Delfan County, Lorestan province, Iran.

== Demographics ==
=== Population ===
At the time of the 2006 National Census, the village's population was 53 in 13 households, when it was in Kakavand District. The following census in 2011 counted 37 people in 11 households. The 2016 census measured the population of the village as 25 people in eight households.

In 2022, the rural district was separated from the district in the formation of Itivand District.
