= Hasan Beyg Mordeh =

Village in Lorestan province, Iran

Hasan Beyg Mordeh Persian: حسن بگ مرده
- Village
- Country: Iran
- Province: Lorestan
- County: Delfan
- District: Itivand
- Rural District: Itivand-e Jonubi

Population (2016)
  - Total: Below reporting threshold
- Time zone: UTC+3:30 (IRST)

Hasan Beyg Mordeh (Persian: حسن بگ مرده) is a village in Itivand-e Jonubi Rural District of Itivand District in Delfan County, Lorestan province, Iran.

== Demographics ==
=== Population ===
At the time of the 2006 National Census, the village's population was 16 in four households, when it was in Kakavand District. The following census in 2011 counted 17 people in five households. The 2016 census measured the population of the village as below the reporting threshold.

In 2022, the rural district was separated from the district in the formation of Itivand District.
