= Tork Amir =

Village in Lorestan province, Iran

Tork Amir Persian: ترك امير
- Village
- Location within Iran
- Coordinates: 34°01′09″N 47°46′42″E
- Country: Iran
- Province: Lorestan
- County: Delfan
- District: Itivand
- Rural District: Itivand-e Jonubi

Population (2016)
  - Total: 39
- Time zone: UTC+3:30 (IRST)

Tork Amir (Persian: ترك امير) (Note: Also romanized as Tork Amīr) is a village in Itivand-e Jonubi Rural District of Itivand District in Delfan County, Lorestan province, Iran.

== Demographics ==
=== Population ===
At the time of the 2006 National Census, the village's population was 51 in 12 households, when it was in Kakavand District. The following census in 2011 counted 50 people in 13 households. The 2016 census measured the population of the village as 39 people in 12 households.

In 2022, the rural district was separated from the district in the formation of Itivand District.
