= Tunab =

Village in Lorestan province, Iran

Tunab Persian: توناب
- Village
- Country: Iran
- Province: Lorestan
- County: Delfan
- District: Itivand
- Rural District: Itivand-e Jonubi

Population (2016)
  - Total: 87
- Time zone: UTC+3:30 (IRST)

Tunab (Persian: توناب) (Note: Also romanized as Tūnāb) is a village in Itivand-e Jonubi Rural District of Itivand District in Delfan County, Lorestan province, Iran.

== Demographics ==
=== Population ===
At the time of the 2006 National Census, the village's population was 73 in 10 households, when it was in Kakavand District. The following census in 2011 counted 69 people in 16 households. The 2016 census measured the population of the village as 87 people in 22 households.

In 2022, the rural district was separated from the district in the formation of Itivand District.
