= Chal Seyyed Ali =

Village in Lorestan province, Iran

Chal Seyyed Ali Persian: چال صيدعلي
- Village
- Location within Iran
- Coordinates: 34°10′52″N 47°51′33″E
- Country: Iran
- Province: Lorestan
- County: Delfan
- District: Itivand
- Rural District: Itivand-e Shomali

Population (2016)
  - Total: 88
- Time zone: UTC+3:30 (IRST)

Chal Seyyed Ali (Persian: چال صيدعلي) (Note: Also romanized as Chāl Seyyed ʿAlī) is a village in Itivand-e Shomali Rural District of Itivand District in Delfan County, Lorestan province, Iran.

== Demographics ==
=== Population ===
At the time of the 2006 National Census, the village's population was 125 in 28 households, when it was in Kakavand District. The following census in 2011 counted 103 people in 25 households. The 2016 census measured the population of the village as 88 people in 21 households.

In 2022, the rural district was separated from the district in the formation of Itivand District.
