= Darkubi =

Village in Lorestan province, Iran

Darkubi Persian: دارکوبي
- Village
- Country: Iran
- Province: Lorestan
- County: Delfan
- District: Itivand
- Rural District: Itivand-e Shomali

Population (2016)
  - Total: Below reporting threshold
- Time zone: UTC+3:30 (IRST)

Darkubi (Persian: دارکوبي) (Note: Also romanized as Dārkūbī; also known as Darkuli (دارکولي), also romanized as Dārkūlī) is a village in Itivand-e Shomali Rural District of Itivand District in Delfan County, Lorestan province, Iran.

== Demographics ==
=== Population ===
At the time of the 2006 National Census, the village's population was 30 in four households, when it was in Kakavand District. The following censuses in 2011 and 2016 counted a population below the reporting threshold.

In 2022, the rural district was separated from the district in the formation of Itivand District.
