= Daram Rud =

Daram Rud (Persian: درم رود or دارامرود) may refer to:

- Daram Rud, Kerman (درم رود - Daram Rūd)
- Daram Rud, Kurdistan (دارامرود - Dārām Rūd)

== See also ==
- Daramrud (disambiguation)
