= Kaleh Kaleh-ye Olya =

Village in Lorestan province, Iran

Kaleh Kaleh-ye Olya Persian: كله كله عليا
- Village
- Location within Iran
- Coordinates: 34°11′30″N 47°53′40″E
- Country: Iran
- Province: Lorestan
- County: Delfan
- District: Itivand
- Rural District: Itivand-e Shomali

Population (2016)
  - Total: 20
- Time zone: UTC+3:30 (IRST)

Kaleh Kaleh-ye Olya (Persian: كله كله عليا) (Note: Also romanized as Kaleh Kaleh ʿOlyā and Kaleh Kaleh-ye ʿOlyā) is a village in Itivand-e Shomali Rural District of Itivand District in Delfan County, Lorestan province, Iran.

== Demographics ==
=== Population ===
At the time of the 2006 National Census, the village's population was 107 in 25 households, when it was in Kakavand District. The following census in 2011 counted 98 people in 27 households. The 2016 census measured the population of the village as 20 people in five households.

In 2022, the rural district was separated from the district in the formation of Itivand District.
