= Garmeh Khani, Itivand =

Village in Lorestan province, Iran

Garmeh Khani Persian: گرمه خاني
- Village
- Location within Iran
- Coordinates: 34°08′31″N 47°43′42″E
- Country: Iran
- Province: Lorestan
- County: Delfan
- District: Itivand
- Rural District: Itivand-e Jonubi

Population (2016)
  - Total: 129
- Time zone: UTC+3:30 (IRST)

Garmeh Khani (Persian: گرمه خاني) (Note: Also romanized as Garmeh Khānī; formerly known as Garm Khani (گرم خاني), also romanized as Garm Khānī; also known as Gazmehkhānī) is a village in Itivand-e Jonubi Rural District of Itivand District in Delfan County, Lorestan province, Iran.

== Demographics ==
=== Population ===
At the time of the 2006 National Census, the village's population, as Garm Khani, was 154 in 30 households, when it was in Kakavand District. The following census in 2011 counted 171 people in 39 households, by which time the village was listed as Garmeh Khani. The 2016 census measured the population of the village as 129 people in 26 households.

In 2022, the rural district was separated from the district in the formation of Itivand District.
