= Chafteh =

Chafteh (Persian: چفته) may refer to:

- Chafteh, Kermanshah
- Chafteh, Yazd

== See also ==
- Chafteh Darreh (disambiguation)
