= Garkan-e Bala =

Village in Lorestan province, Iran

Garkan-e Bala Persian: گرکان بالا
- Village
- Location within Iran
- Coordinates: 34°09′14″N 47°46′42″E
- Country: Iran
- Province: Lorestan
- County: Delfan
- District: Itivand
- Rural District: Itivand-e Shomali

Population (2016)
  - Total: 92
- Time zone: UTC+3:30 (IRST)

Garden-e Bala (Persian: گرکان بالا) (Note: Also romanized as Garkān-e Bālā; formerly known as Karkan-e Olya (كركان عليا), also romanized as Karkān-e ‘Olyā; also known as Kargān-e ‘Olyā) is a village in Itivand-e Shomali Rural District of Itivand District in Delfan County, Lorestan province, Iran.

== Demographics ==
=== Population ===
At the time of the 2006 National Census, the village's population, as Karkan-e Olya, was 244 in 38 households, when it was in Kakavand District. The following census in 2011 counted 259 people in 66 households, by which time the village was listed as Garkan-e Bala. The 2016 census measured the population of the village as 92 people in 27 households.

In 2022, the rural district was separated from the district in the formation of Itivand District.
