= Yarvaliabad =

Village in Lorestan province, Iran

Yarvaliabad Persian: يارولي آباد
- Village
- Location within Iran
- Coordinates: 34°05′44″N 47°52′45″E
- Country: Iran
- Province: Lorestan
- County: Delfan
- District: Itivand
- Rural District: Itivand-e Shomali

Population (2016)
  - Total: 373
- Time zone: UTC+3:30 (IRST)

Yarvaliabad (Persian: يارولي آباد) (Note: Also romanized as Yārvalīābād; also known as Dah Pahlavān and Yārvalī) is a village in Itivand-e Shomali Rural District of Itivand District in Delfan County, Lorestan province, Iran.

== Demographics ==
=== Population ===
At the time of the 2006 National Census, the village's population was 223 in 45 households, when it was in Kakavand District. The following census in 2011 counted 292 people in 72 households. The 2016 census measured the population of the village as 373 people in 98 households.

In 2022, the rural district was separated from the district in the formation of Itivand District.
