= Aliabad-e Pirdusti =

Village in Lorestan province, Iran

Aliabad-e Pirdusti Persian: علي ابادپيردوستي
- Village
- Location within Iran
- Coordinates: 33°55′17″N 47°49′48″E
- Country: Iran
- Province: Lorestan
- County: Delfan
- District: Itivand
- Rural District: Itivand-e Shomali

Population (2016)
  - Total: 23
- Time zone: UTC+3:30 (IRST)

Aliabad-e Pirdusti (Persian: علي ابادپيردوستي) (Note: Also romanized as ‘Alīābād-e Pīrdūstī; also known as ‘Alīābād) is a village in Itivand-e Shomali Rural District of Itivand District in Delfan County, Lorestan province, Iran.

== Demographics ==
=== Population ===
At the time of the 2006 National Census, the village's population was 38 in five households, when it was in Kakavand District. The following census in 2011 counted 32 people in nine households. The 2016 census measured the population of the village as 23 people in five households.

In 2022, the rural district was separated from the district in the formation of Itivand District.
