= Qeshlaq-e Posht Qala =

Village in Lorestan province, Iran

Qeshlaq-e Posht Qala Persian: قشلاق پشت قلا
- Village
- Location within Iran
- Coordinates: 34°01′50″N 47°35′06″E
- Country: Iran
- Province: Lorestan
- County: Delfan
- District: Itivand
- Rural District: Itivand-e Jonubi

Population (2016)
  - Total: 21
- Time zone: UTC+3:30 (IRST)

Qeshlaq-e Posht Qala (Persian: قشلاق پشت قلا) (Note: Also romanized as Qeshlāq-e Posht Qalā) is a village in Itivand-e Jonubi Rural District of Itivand District in Delfan County, Lorestan province, Iran.

== Demographics ==
=== Population ===
At the time of the 2006 National Census, the village's population was 22 in four households, when it was in Kakavand District. The following census in 2011 counted 20 people in seven households. The 2016 census measured the population of the village as 21 people in seven households.

In 2022, the rural district was separated from the district in the formation of Itivand District.
