= Kaleh Kaleh-ye Pain =

Village in Lorestan province, Iran

Kaleh Kaleh-ye Pain Persian: کله کله پايين
- Village
- Location within Iran
- Coordinates: 34°11′26″N 47°54′15″E
- Country: Iran
- Province: Lorestan
- County: Delfan
- District: Itivand
- Rural District: Itivand-e Shomali

Population (2016)
  - Total: 60
- Time zone: UTC+3:30 (IRST)

Kaleh Kaleh-ye Pain (Persian: کله کله پايين) (Note: Also romanized as Kaleh Kaleh-ye Pā’īn; also known as Kaleh Kaleh-ye Soflá) is a village in Itivand-e Shomali Rural District of Itivand District in Delfan County, Lorestan province, Iran.

== Demographics ==
=== Population ===
The village did not appear in the 2006 National Census, when it was in Kakavand District. The 2016 census measured the population of the village as 60 people in 16 households.

In 2022, the rural district was separated from the district in the formation of Itivand District.
