= Deh Gorzeh =

Deh Gorzeh ده گرزه
- Village
- Location within Iran
- Coordinates: 34°08′00″N 47°37′00″E
- Country: Iran
- Province: Lorestan
- County: Delfan
- Bakhsh: Kakavand
- Rural District: Kakavand-e Gharbi

Population (2006)
  - Total: 111
- Time zone: UTC+3:30 (IRST)
  - Summer (DST): UTC+4:30 (IRDT)

Deh Gorzeh (Persian: ده گرزه) is a village in Kakavand-e Gharbi Rural District, Kakavand District, Delfan County, Lorestan Province, Iran. At the 2006 census, its population was 111, in 21 families.
