= Golestanak, Lorestan =

Village in Lorestan province, Iran

Golestanak Persian: گلستانك
- Village
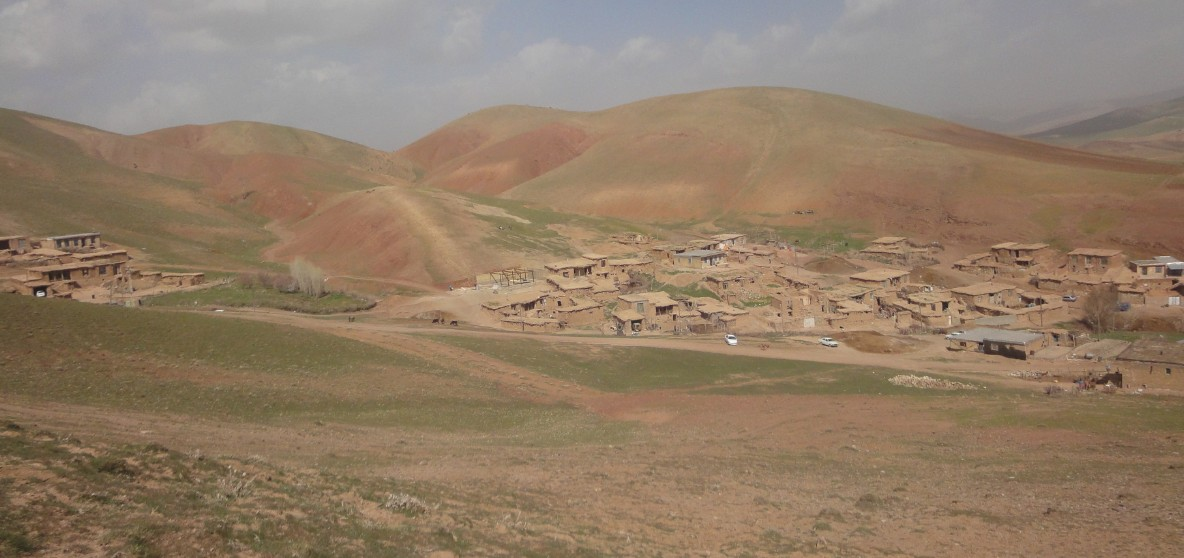
- The village of Golestanak

- Location within Iran
- Coordinates: 34°03′36″N 47°43′25″E
- Country: Iran
- Province: Lorestan
- County: Delfan
- District: Itivand
- Rural District: Itivand-e Jonubi

Population (2016)
  - Total: 98
- Time zone: UTC+3:30 (IRST)

Golestanak (Persian: گلستانك) (Note: Also romanized as Golestānak; also known as Golestān) is a village in Itivand-e Jonubi Rural District of Itivand District in Delfan County, Lorestan province, Iran.

== Demographics ==
=== Population ===
At the time of the 2006 National Census, the village's population was 138 in 25 households, when it was in Kakavand District. The following census in 2011 counted 94 people in 20 households. The 2016 census measured the population of the village as 98 people in 14 households.

In 2022, the rural district was separated from the district in the formation of Itivand District.
