= Badam Shirin =

Badam Shirin (Persian: بادامشيرين) may refer to:

- Badam Shirin, Delfan, Lorestan Province
- Badam Shirin, Selseleh, Lorestan Province
