= Bakbarabad-e Pirdusti =

Village in Lorestan province, Iran

Bakbarabad-e Pirdusti Persian: باقرابادپيردوستي
- Village
- Location within Iran
- Coordinates: 34°08′27″N 47°50′55″E
- Country: Iran
- Province: Lorestan
- County: Delfan
- District: Itivand
- Rural District: Itivand-e Shomali

Population (2016)
  - Total: 17
- Time zone: UTC+3:30 (IRST)

Bakbarabad-e Pirdusti (Persian: باقرابادپيردوستي) (Note: Also romanized as Bakbarabad-e Pir Dusti, Bākbarābād-e Pīr Dūstī, and Bākbarābād-e Pīrdūstī; also known as ‘Alī Akbarābād and ‘Alī Akbarābād-e Pīr Dūstī) is a village in Itivand-e Shomali Rural District of Itivand District in Delfan County, Lorestan province, Iran.

== Demographics ==
=== Population ===
At the time of the 2006 National Census, the village's population was 35 in eight households, when it was in Kakavand District. The following census in 2011 counted 25 people in seven households. The 2016 census measured the population of the village as 17 people in four households.

In 2022, the rural district was separated from the district in the formation of Itivand District.
