= Seyl Cheshmeh =

Seyl Cheshmeh (Persian: سيل چشمه) may refer to:

- Seyl Cheshmeh-ye Olya
- Seyl Cheshmeh-ye Sofla
