= Seyyed Abbas, Lorestan =

Village in Lorestan province, Iran

Seyyed Abbas Persian: سيد عباس
- Village
- Location within Iran
- Coordinates: 33°57′04″N 47°35′33″E
- Country: Iran
- Province: Lorestan
- County: Delfan
- District: Itivand
- Rural District: Itivand-e Jonubi

Population (2016)
  - Total: 19
- Time zone: UTC+3:30 (IRST)

Seyyed Abbas (Persian: سيد عباس) (Note: Also romanized as Seyyed ʿAbbās; also known as Varkuh (ورکوه), also romanized as Varkūh) is a village in Itivand-e Jonubi Rural District of Itivand District in Delfan County, Lorestan province, Iran.

== Demographics ==
=== Population ===
At the time of the 2006 National Census, the village's population was 68 in 15 households, when it was in Kakavand District. The following census in 2011 counted 52 people in 12 households. The 2016 census measured the population of the village as 19 people in four households.

In 2022, the rural district was separated from the district in the formation of Itivand District.
