= Seyyed Heshmat =

Village in Lorestan province, Iran

Seyyed Heshmat Persian: سيدحشمت
- Village
- Location within Iran
- Coordinates: 33°55′08″N 47°44′19″E
- Country: Iran
- Province: Lorestan
- County: Delfan
- District: Itivand
- Rural District: Itivand-e Jonubi

Population (2016)
  - Total: 42
- Time zone: UTC+3:30 (IRST)

Seyyed Heshmat (Persian: سيدحشمت) (Note: Also romanized as Seyyed Ḩeshmat; also known as Ḩeshmatābād) is a village in Itivand-e Jonubi Rural District of Itivand District in Delfan County, Lorestan province, Iran.

== Demographics ==
=== Population ===
At the time of the 2006 National Census, the village's population was 64 in 12 households, when it was in Kakavand District. The following census in 2011 counted 55 people in nine households. The 2016 census measured the population of the village as 42 people in nine households.

In 2022, the rural district was separated from the district in the formation of Itivand District.
