= Darreh Deh =

Village in Lorestan province, Iran

Darreh Deh Persian: دره ده
- Village
- Location within Iran
- Country: Iran
- Province: Lorestan
- County: Delfan
- District: Itivand
- Rural District: Itivand-e Shomali

Population (2016)
  - Total: 11
- Time zone: UTC+3:30 (IRST)

Darreh Deh (Persian: دره ده) is a village in Itivand-e Shomali Rural District of Itivand District in Delfan County, Lorestan province, Iran.

== Demographics ==
=== Population ===
At the time of the 2006 National Census, the village's population was 33 in seven households, when it was in Kakavand District. The following census in 2011 counted 23 people in five households. The 2016 census measured the population of the village as 11 people in four households.

In 2022, the rural district was separated from the district in the formation of Itivand District.
