= Yaramiri =

Village in Lorestan province, Iran

Yaramiri Persian: ياراميري
- Village
- Location within Iran
- Country: Iran
- Province: Lorestan
- County: Delfan
- District: Itivand
- Rural District: Itivand-e Shomali

Population (2016)
  - Total: 32
- Time zone: UTC+3:30 (IRST)

Yaramiri (Persian: ياراميري) (Note: Also romanized as Yārāmīrī; formerly known as Yaramushi (ياراموشي), also romanized as Yārāmūshī) is a village in Itivand-e Shomali Rural District of Itivand District in Delfan County, Lorestan province, Iran.

== Demographics ==
=== Population ===
At the time of the 2006 National Census, the village's population, as Yaramushi, was 74 in 11 households, when it was in Kakavand District. The following census in 2011 counted 42 people in nine households, by which time the village was listed as Yaramiri. The 2016 census measured the population of the village as 32 people in nine households.

In 2022, the rural district was separated from the district in the formation of Itivand District.
