= Cham Anjir =

Cham Anjir (Persian: چم انجير) may refer to:

- Cham Anjir, Delfan
- Cham Anjir, Khorramabad
