= Zardeh Savar, Itivand =

Village in Lorestan province, Iran

Zardeh Savar Persian: زرده سوار
- Village
- Location within Iran
- Coordinates: 33°56′40″N 47°42′47″E
- Country: Iran
- Province: Lorestan
- County: Delfan
- District: Itivand
- Rural District: Itivand-e Jonubi

Population (2016)
  - Total: 101
- Time zone: UTC+3:30 (IRST)

Zardeh Savar (Persian: زرده سوار) (Note: Also romanized as Zardeh Savār; also known as Zardeh Savār-e Sarkeshtī (زرده سوار سرکشتي)) is a village in Itivand-e Jonubi Rural District of Itivand District in Delfan County, Lorestan province, Iran.

== Demographics ==
=== Population ===
At the time of the 2006 National Census, the village's population was 152 in 25 households, when it was in Kakavand District. The following census in 2011 counted 105 people in 20 households. The 2016 census measured the population of the village as 101 people in 26 households.

In 2022, the rural district was separated from the district in the formation of Itivand District.
