= Chiyeh =

Village in Lorestan province, Iran

Chiyeh Persian: چيه
- Village
- Location within Iran
- Coordinates: 34°00′22″N 47°45′41″E
- Country: Iran
- Province: Lorestan
- County: Delfan
- District: Itivand
- Rural District: Itivand-e Jonubi

Population (2016)
  - Total: 194
- Time zone: UTC+3:30 (IRST)

Chiyeh (Persian: چيه) (Note: Also romanized as Chīyeh) is a village in Itivand-e Jonubi Rural District of Itivand District in Delfan County, Lorestan province, Iran.

== Demographics ==
=== Population ===
At the time of the 2006 National Census, the village's population was 196 in 42 households, when it was in Kakavand District. The following census in 2011 counted 172 people in 43 households. The 2016 census measured the population of the village as 194 people in 47 households.

In 2022, the rural district was separated from the district in the formation of Itivand District.
