= Cherush-e Itivand =

Village in Lorestan province, Iran

Cherush-e Itivand Persian: چروش ایتیوند
- Village
- Location within Iran
- Coordinates: 34°07′03″N 47°43′41″E
- Country: Iran
- Province: Lorestan
- County: Delfan
- District: Itivand
- Rural District: Itivand-e Jonubi

Population (2016)
  - Total: 210
- Time zone: UTC+3:30 (IRST)

Cherush-e Itivand (Persian: چروش ایتیوند) (Note: Also romanized as Cherūsh-e Ītīvand; also known as Cherūsh-e Ītvand) is a village in Itivand-e Jonubi Rural District of Itivand District in Delfan County, Lorestan province, Iran.

== Demographics ==
=== Population ===
At the time of the 2006 National Census, the village's population was 250 in 51 households, when it was in Kakavand District. The following census in 2011 counted 231 people in 45 households. The 2016 census measured the population of the village as 210 people in 50 households.

In 2022, the rural district was separated from the district in the formation of Itivand District.
