= Moradabad-e Pirdusti =

Village in Lorestan province, Iran

Moradabad-e Pirdusti Persian: مرادآباد پيردوستي
- Village
- Location within Iran
- Country: Iran
- Province: Lorestan
- County: Delfan
- District: Itivand
- Rural District: Itivand-e Shomali

Population (2016)
  - Total: 37
- Time zone: UTC+3:30 (IRST)

Moradabad-e Pirdusti (Persian: مرادآباد پيردوستي) (Note: Also romanized as Morādābād-e Pīrdūstī; also known as Morādābād) is a village in Itivand-e Shomali Rural District of Itivand District in Delfan County, Lorestan province, Iran.

== Demographics ==
=== Population ===
At the time of the 2006 National Census, the village's population was 42 in 10 households, when it was in Kakavand District. The following census in 2011 counted 37 people in 11 households. The 2016 census measured the population of the village as 37 people in 10 households.

In 2022, the rural district was separated from the district in the formation of Itivand District.
