= Zafarabad, Itivand =

Village in Lorestan province, Iran

Zafarabad Persian: ظفراباد
- Village
- Location within Iran
- Country: Iran
- Province: Lorestan
- County: Delfan
- District: Itivand
- Rural District: Itivand-e Jonubi

Population (2016)
  - Total: 114
- Time zone: UTC+3:30 (IRST)

Zafarabad (Persian: ظفراباد) (Note: Also romanized as Zafarābād; also known as Zafarābād-e Janqoli) is a village in Itivand-e Jonubi Rural District of Itivand District in Delfan County, Lorestan province, Iran.

== Demographics ==
=== Population ===
At the time of the 2006 National Census, the village's population was 144 in 23 households, when it was in Kakavand District. The following census in 2011 counted 123 people in 29 households. The 2016 census measured the population of the village as 114 people in 27 households.

In 2022, the rural district was separated from the district in the formation of Itivand District.
