= Cham Mokhtar =

Village in Lorestan province, Iran

Cham Mokhtar Persian: چممختار
- Village
- Location within Iran
- Coordinates: 34°04′20″N 47°40′29″E
- Country: Iran
- Province: Lorestan
- County: Delfan
- District: Itivand
- Rural District: Itivand-e Jonubi

Population (2016)
  - Total: 59
- Time zone: UTC+3:30 (IRST)

Cham Mokhtar (Persian: چممختار) (Note: Also romanized as Cham Mokhtār) is a village in Itivand-e Jonubi Rural District of Itivand District in Delfan County, Lorestan province, Iran.

== Demographics ==
=== Population ===
At the time of the 2006 National Census, the village's population was 56 in 11 households, when it was in Kakavand District. The following census in 2011 counted 72 people in 18 households. The 2016 census measured the population of the village as 59 people in 18 households.

In 2022, the rural district was separated from the district in the formation of Itivand District.
