= Zarrin Ju, Lorestan =

Village in Lorestan province, Iran

Zarrin Ju Persian: زرين جو
- Village
- Location within Iran
- Coordinates: 33°53′46″N 48°02′00″E
- Country: Iran
- Province: Lorestan
- County: Delfan
- District: Itivand
- Rural District: Itivand-e Shomali

Population (2016)
  - Total: 25
- Time zone: UTC+3:30 (IRST)

Zarrin Ju (Persian: زرين جو) (Note: Also romanized as Zarrīn Jū) is a village in Itivand-e Shomali Rural District of Itivand District in Delfan County, Lorestan province, Iran.

== Demographics ==
=== Population ===
At the time of the 2006 National Census, the village's population was 44 in six households, when it was in Kakavand District. The following census in 2011 counted 41 people in 17 households. The 2016 census measured the population of the village as 25 people in five households.

In 2022, the rural district was separated from the district in the formation of Itivand District.
