= Shah Parvarmordeh =

Village in Lorestan province, Iran

Shah Parvarmordeh Persian: شاه پرورمرده
- Village
- Location within Iran
- Country: Iran
- Province: Lorestan
- County: Delfan
- District: Itivand
- Rural District: Itivand-e Jonubi

Population (2016)
  - Total: 22
- Time zone: UTC+3:30 (IRST)

Shah Parvarmordeh (Persian: شاه پرورمرده) (Note: Also romanized as Shāh Parvarmordeh; also known as Shāh Parvardeh) is a village in Itivand-e Jonubi Rural District of Itivand District in Delfan County, Lorestan province, Iran.

== Demographics ==
=== Population ===
At the time of the 2006 National Census, the village's population was 24 in four households, when it was in Kakavand District. The following census in 2011 counted 22 people in four households. The 2016 census measured the population of the village as 22 people in five households.

In 2022, the rural district was separated from the district in the formation of Itivand District.
