= Basatabad =

Basatabad (Persian: بساطاباد) may refer to:

- Basatabad, Delfan
- Basatabad, Selseleh
