= Javadabad, Delfan =

Village in Lorestan province, Iran

Javadabad Persian: جوادآباد
- Village
- Location within Iran
- Coordinates: 33°56′07″N 47°44′36″E
- Country: Iran
- Province: Lorestan
- County: Delfan
- District: Itivand
- Rural District: Itivand-e Jonubi

Population (2016)
  - Total: 93
- Time zone: UTC+3:30 (IRST)

Javadabad (Persian: جوادآباد) (Note: Also romanized as Javādābād; also known as Jām Qolī and Z̧afarābād) is a village in Itivand-e Jonubi Rural District of Itivand District in Delfan County, Lorestan province, Iran.

== Demographics ==
=== Population ===
At the time of the 2006 National Census, the village's population was 83 in 17 households, when it was in Kakavand District. The following census in 2011 counted 87 people in 20 households. The 2016 census measured the population of the village as 93 people in 24 households.

In 2022, the rural district was separated from the district in the formation of Itivand District.
