= Darreh Yadegar =

Village in Lorestan province, Iran

Darreh Yadegar Persian: دره يادگار
- Village
- Location within Iran
- Coordinates: 34°09′14″N 47°46′42″E
- Country: Iran
- Province: Lorestan
- County: Delfan
- District: Itivand
- Rural District: Itivand-e Shomali

Population (2016)
  - Total: 188
- Time zone: UTC+3:30 (IRST)

Darreh Yadegar (Persian: دره يادگار) (Note: Also romanized as Darreh Yādegār) is a village in Itivand-e Shomali Rural District of Itivand District in Delfan County, Lorestan province, Iran.

== Demographics ==
=== Population ===
At the time of the 2006 National Census, the village's population was 267 in 46 households, when it was in Kakavand District. The following census in 2011 counted 209 people in 61 households. The 2016 census measured the population of the village as 188 people in 54 households.

In 2022, the rural district was separated from the district in the formation of Itivand District.
