= Heydarabad, Itivand-e Jonubi =

Village in Lorestan province, Iran

Heydarabad Persian: حيدر آباد
- Village
- Location within Iran
- Country: Iran
- Province: Lorestan
- County: Delfan
- District: Itivand
- Rural District: Itivand-e Jonubi

Population (2016)
  - Total: 0
- Time zone: UTC+3:30 (IRST)

Heydarabad (Persian: حيدر آباد) (Note: Also romanized as Ḩeydarābād; formerly known as Melaharbeyg (ملاهاربيگ), also romanized as Melāhārbeyg) is a village in Itivand-e Jonubi Rural District of Itivand District in Delfan County, Lorestan province, Iran.

== Demographics ==
=== Population ===
At the time of the 2006 National Census, the village's population, as Melaharbeyg, was 41 in six households, when it was in Kakavand District. The following census in 2011 counted 33 people in nine households, by which time the village was listed as Heyderabad. The 2016 census measured the population of the village as zero.

In 2022, the rural district was separated from the district in the formation of Itivand District.
