= Cham Hesar =

Village in Lorestan province, Iran

Cham Hesar Persian: چم حصار
- Village
- Location within Iran
- Coordinates: 34°03′24″N 47°36′31″E
- Country: Iran
- Province: Lorestan
- County: Delfan
- District: Itivand
- Rural District: Itivand-e Jonubi

Population (2016)
  - Total: 79
- Time zone: UTC+3:30 (IRST)

Cham Hesar (Persian: چم حصار) (Note: Also romanized as Cham Ḩeşār; also known as Cham Ḩeşār-e ‘Olyā) is a village in Itivand-e Jonubi Rural District of Itivand District in Delfan County, Lorestan province, Iran.

== Demographics ==
=== Population ===
At the time of the 2006 National Census, the village's population was 114 in 21 households, when it was in Kakavand District. The following census in 2011 counted 68 people in 13 households. The 2016 census measured the population of the village as 79 people in 20 households.

In 2022, the rural district was separated from the district in the formation of Itivand District.
