= Qomish =

Qomish, Qomīsh, Qomesh, Komash, Kumāsh, Qamesh, Qamsh, or Qomāsh (Persian: قمش) may refer to:

- Qomesh, Kermanshah
- Qomish, Lorestan
