= Qeshlaq-e Tahsaran =

Village in Lorestan province, Iran

Qeshlaq-e Tahsaran Persian: قشلاق ته سران
- Village
- Location within Iran
- Country: Iran
- Province: Lorestan
- County: Delfan
- District: Itivand
- Rural District: Itivand-e Jonubi

Population (2016)
  - Total: 24
- Time zone: UTC+3:30 (IRST)

Qeshlaq-e Tahsaran (Persian: قشلاق ته سران) (Note: Also romanized as Qeshlāq-e Tahsarān) is a village in Itivand-e Jonubi Rural District of Itivand District in Delfan County, Lorestan province, Iran.

== Demographics ==
=== Population ===
At the time of the 2006 National Census, the village's population was 41 in six households, when it was in Kakavand District. The following census in 2011 counted 40 people in 10 households. The 2016 census measured the population of the village as 24 people in seven households.

In 2022, the rural district was separated from the district in the formation of Itivand District.
