= Balut Bazeh =

Village in Lorestan province, Iran

Balut Bazeh Persian: بلوط بازه
- Village
- Location within Iran
- Coordinates: 34°01′33″N 47°46′56″E
- Country: Iran
- Province: Lorestan
- County: Delfan
- District: Itivand
- Rural District: Itivand-e Jonubi

Population (2016)
  - Total: 166
- Time zone: UTC+3:30 (IRST)

Balut Bazeh (Persian: بلوط بازه) (Note: Also romanized as Balūţ Bāzeh) is a village in Itivand-e Jonubi Rural District of Itivand District in Delfan County, Lorestan province, Iran.

== Demographics ==
=== Population ===
At the time of the 2006 National Census, the village's population was 170 in 33 households, when it was in Kakavand District. The following census in 2011 counted 149 people in 34 households. The 2016 census measured the population of the village as 166 people in 38 households.

In 2022, the rural district was separated from the district in the formation of Itivand District.
