= Riseh Vand =

Village in Lorestan province, Iran

Riseh Vand Persian: ريسه وند
- Village
- Country: Iran
- Province: Lorestan
- County: Delfan
- District: Itivand
- Rural District: Itivand-e Jonubi

Population (2016)
  - Total: Below reporting threshold
- Time zone: UTC+3:30 (IRST)

Riseh Vand (Persian: ريسه وند) (Note: Also romanized as Rīseh Vand; also known as Rish Vand, Rīsh Vand, and Rivand (‌ریوند)) is a village in Itivand-e Jonubi Rural District of Itivand District in Delfan County, Lorestan province, Iran.

== Demographics ==
=== Population ===
At the time of the 2006 National Census, the village's population was 30 in five households, when it was in Kakavand District. The following census in 2011 counted 20 people in four households. The 2016 census measured the population of the village as below the reporting threshold.

In 2022, the rural district was separated from the district in the formation of Itivand District.
