= Qazi Khani =

Village in Lorestan province, Iran

Qazi Khani Persian: قاضي خاني
- Village
- Location within Iran
- Coordinates: 34°14′19″N 47°50′24″E
- Country: Iran
- Province: Lorestan
- County: Delfan
- District: Kakavand
- Rural District: Kakavand-e Sharqi

Population (2016)
  - Total: 302
- Time zone: UTC+3:30 (IRST)

Qazi Khani (Persian: قاضي خاني) (Note: Also romanized as Qāẕī Khānī; also known as Khāvand) is a village in Kakavand-e Sharqi Rural District of Kakavand District in Delfan County, Lorestan province, Iran.

== Demographics ==
=== Population ===
At the time of the 2006 National Census, the village's population was 341 in 71 households. The following census in 2011 counted 353 people in 100 households. The 2016 census measured the population of the village as 302 people in 95 households.
