= Pain Ab-e Olya =

Pain Ab-e Olya پايين آب عليا
- Village
- Location within Iran
- Coordinates: 34°13′58″N 47°49′55″E
- Country: Iran
- Province: Lorestan
- County: Delfan
- Bakhsh: Kakavand
- Rural District: Kakavand-e Sharqi

Population (2006)
  - Total: 115
- Time zone: UTC+3:30 (IRST)
  - Summer (DST): UTC+4:30 (IRDT)

Pain Ab-e Olya (Persian: پايين آب عليا, also Romanized as Pā’īn Āb-e ‘Olyā and Pa’īnāb-e ‘Olyā; also known as Pa'īnāb-e Bālā and Chal-e Zard (Persian: چال زرد), also Romanized as Chāl-e Zard) is a village in Kakavand-e Sharqi Rural District, Kakavand District, Delfan County, Lorestan Province, Iran. At the 2006 census, its population was 115, in 22 families.
