= Chaman Buleh =

Village in Lorestan province, Iran

Chaman Buleh Persian: چمن بوله
- Village
- Location within Iran
- Coordinates: 34°14′08″N 47°47′22″E
- Country: Iran
- Province: Lorestan
- County: Delfan
- District: Kakavand
- Rural District: Kakavand-e Sharqi

Population (2016)
  - Total: 250
- Time zone: UTC+3:30 (IRST)

Chaman Buleh (Persian: چمن بوله) (Note: Also romanized as Chaman Būleh) is a village in Kakavand-e Sharqi Rural District of Kakavand District in Delfan County, Lorestan province, Iran.

== Demographics ==
=== Population ===
At the time of the 2006 National Census, the village's population was 341 in 77 households. The following census in 2011 counted 245 people in 59 households. The 2016 census measured the population of the village as 250 people in 68 households.
