= Khvoshnam, Lorestan =

Village in Lorestan province, Iran

Khvoshnam Persian: خوشنام
- Village
- Location within Iran
- Coordinates: 34°00′30″N 47°47′14″E
- Country: Iran
- Province: Lorestan
- County: Delfan
- District: Itivand
- Rural District: Itivand-e Jonubi

Population (2016)
  - Total: 356
- Time zone: UTC+3:30 (IRST)

Khvoshnam (Persian: خوشنام) (Note: Also romanized as Khvoshnām) is a village in Itivand-e Jonubi Rural District of Itivand District in Delfan County, Lorestan province, Iran.

== Demographics ==
=== Population ===
At the time of the 2006 National Census, the village's population was 326 in 51 households, when it was in Kakavand District. The following census in 2011 counted 306 people in 69 households. The 2016 census measured the population of the village as 356 people in 91 households.

In 2022, the rural district was separated from the district in the formation of Itivand District.
