= Kamaneh-ye Mirzabeygi =

Village in Lorestan province, Iran

Kamaneh-ye Mirzabeygi Persian: کمانه ميرزابگ
- Village
- Location within Iran
- Coordinates: 34°12′31″N 47°53′29″E
- Country: Iran
- Province: Lorestan
- County: Delfan
- District: Itivand
- Rural District: Itivand-e Shomali

Population (2016)
  - Total: 185
- Time zone: UTC+3:30 (IRST)

Kamaneh-ye Mirzabeygi (Persian: کمانه ميرزابگ) (Note: Also romanized as Kamaneh-ye Mīrzābeygī) is a village in Itivand-e Shomali Rural District of Itivand District in Delfan County, Lorestan province, Iran.

== Demographics ==
=== Population ===
At the time of the 2006 National Census, the village's population was 227 in 50 households, when it was in Kakavand District. The following census in 2011 counted 180 people in 49 households. The 2016 census measured the population of the village as 185 people in 68 households.

In 2022, the rural district was separated from the district in the formation of Itivand District.
