= Burbur-e Sofla =

Burbur-e Sofla بوربورسفلي
- Village
- Location within Iran
- Coordinates: 34°07′00″N 47°34′00″E
- Country: Iran
- Province: Lorestan
- County: Delfan
- Bakhsh: Kakavand
- Rural District: Kakavand-e Gharbi

Population (2006)
  - Total: 89
- Time zone: UTC+3:30 (IRST)
  - Summer (DST): UTC+4:30 (IRDT)

Burbur-e Sofla (Persian: بوربورسفلي, also Romanized as Būrbūr-e Soflá) is a village in Kakavand-e Gharbi Rural District, Kakavand District, Delfan County, Lorestan Province, Iran. At the 2006 census, its population was 89, in 17 families.
