= Danah Misi =

Village in Lorestan province, Iran

Danah Misi Persian: دانه ميسي
- Village
- Location within Iran
- Coordinates: 34°06′40″N 47°36′35″E
- Country: Iran
- Province: Lorestan
- County: Delfan
- District: Kakavand
- Rural District: Kakavand-e Gharbi

Population (2016)
  - Total: 508
- Time zone: UTC+3:30 (IRST)

Danah Misi (Persian: دانه ميسي) (Note: Also romanized as Dānah Mīsī) is a village in Kakavand-e Gharbi Rural District of Kakavand District in Delfan County, Lorestan province, Iran.

== Demographics ==
=== Population ===
At the time of the 2006 National Census, the village's population was 687 in 134 households. The following census in 2011 counted 598 people in 141 households. The 2016 census measured the population of the village as 508 people in 135 households.
