= Seyl Cheshmeh-ye Olya =

Seyl Cheshmeh-ye Olya سيل چشمه عليا
- Village
- Location within Iran
- Coordinates: 34°12′58″N 47°44′38″E
- Country: Iran
- Province: Lorestan
- County: Delfan
- Bakhsh: Kakavand
- Rural District: Kakavand-e Sharqi

Population (2006)
  - Total: 63
- Time zone: UTC+3:30 (IRST)
  - Summer (DST): UTC+4:30 (IRDT)

Seyl Cheshmeh-ye Olya (Persian: سيل چشمه عليا, also Romanized as Seyl Cheshmeh-ye ‘Olyā; also known as Seyl Cheshmeh) is a village in Kakavand-e Sharqi Rural District, Kakavand District, Delfan County, Lorestan Province, Iran. At the 2006 census, its population was 63, in 14 families.
