= Sefid Khani Ahmedvand =

Village in Lorestan province, Iran

Sefid Khani Ahmedvand Persian: سفيدخاني احمدوند
- Village
- Country: Iran
- Province: Lorestan
- County: Delfan
- District: Itivand
- Rural District: Itivand-e Jonubi

Population (2016)
  - Total: 97
- Time zone: UTC+3:30 (IRST)

Sefid Khani Ahmedvand (Persian: سفيدخاني احمدوند) (Note: Also romanized as Sefīd Khānī Āḥmedvand; also known as Krūbaneh (کروبنه)) is a village in Itivand-e Jonubi Rural District of Itivand District in Delfan County, Lorestan province, Iran.

== Demographics ==
=== Population ===
At the time of the 2006 National Census, the village's population was 90 in 18 households, when it was in Kakavand District. The following census in 2011 counted 132 people in 26 households. The 2016 census measured the population of the village as 97 people in 20 households.

In 2022, the rural district was separated from the district in the formation of Itivand District.
