= Jafarkhan, Lorestan =

Village in Lorestan province, Iran

Jafarkhan Persian: جعفرخان
- Village
- Location within Iran
- Country: Iran
- Province: Lorestan
- County: Delfan
- District: Itivand
- Rural District: Itivand-e Jonubi

Population (2016)
  - Total: 33
- Time zone: UTC+3:30 (IRST)

Jafarkhan (Persian: جعفرخان) (Note: Also romanized as Ja‘farkhān; also known as Rezaabad (رضا آباد)) is a village in Itivand-e Jonubi Rural District of Itivand District in Delfan County, Lorestan province, Iran.

== Demographics ==
=== Population ===
At the time of the 2006 National Census, the village's population was 79 in 13 households, when it was in Kakavand District. The following census in 2011 counted 68 people in 13 households. The 2016 census measured the population of the village as 55 people in 11 households.

In 2022, the rural district was separated from the district in the formation of Itivand District.
