= Zargaran, Lorestan =

Village in Lorestan province, Iran

Zargaran Persian: زرگران
- Village
- Location within Iran
- Coordinates: 34°10′48″N 47°44′32″E
- Country: Iran
- Province: Lorestan
- County: Delfan
- District: Kakavand
- Rural District: Kakavand-e Sharqi

Population (2016)
  - Total: 342
- Time zone: UTC+3:30 (IRST)

Zargaran (Persian: زرگران) (Note: Also romanized as Zargarān) is a village in Kakavand-e Sharqi Rural District of Kakavand District in Delfan County, Lorestan province, Iran.

== Demographics ==
=== Population ===
At the time of the 2006 National Census, the village's population was 194 in 46 households. The following census in 2011 counted 236 people in 60 households. The 2016 census measured the population of the village as 342 people in 89 households.
