= Emamzadeh Ebrahim =

Emamzadeh Ebrahim (Persian: امامزاده ابراهيم) may refer to:

- Emamzadeh Ebrahim, Ardabil
- Emamzadeh Ebrahim, Gilan
- Emamzadeh Ebrahim, Lorestan
- Emamzadeh Ebrahim, Razavi Khorasan
