= Seyyed Ali, Lorestan =

Seyyed Ali, Lorestan may refer to:

- Seyyed Ali, Delfan
- Seyyed Ali, Kakavand
