= Khosrow Khani, Delfan =

Village in Lorestan province, Iran

Khosrow Khani Persian: خسروخاني
- Village
- Location within Iran
- Coordinates: 34°09′34″N 47°53′16″E
- Country: Iran
- Province: Lorestan
- County: Delfan
- District: Itivand
- Rural District: Itivand-e Shomali

Population (2016)
  - Total: 36
- Time zone: UTC+3:30 (IRST)

Khosrow Khani (Persian: خسروخاني) (Note: Also romanized as Khosrow Khānī) is a village in Itivand-e Shomali Rural District of Itivand District in Delfan County, Lorestan province, Iran.

== Demographics ==
=== Population ===
At the time of the 2006 National Census, the village's population was 67 in 13 households, when it was in Kakavand District. The following census in 2011 counted 38 people in 10 households. The 2016 census measured the population of the village as 36 people in 10 households.

In 2022, the rural district was separated from the district in the formation of Itivand District.
