= Tazehabad, Delfan =

Village in Lorestan province, Iran

Tazehabad Persian: تازه آباد
- Village
- Location within Iran
- Country: Iran
- Province: Lorestan
- County: Delfan
- District: Itivand
- Rural District: Itivand-e Jonubi

Population (2016)
  - Total: 26
- Time zone: UTC+3:30 (IRST)

Tazehabad (Persian: تازه آباد) (Note: Also romanized as Tāzehābād; also known as Dārāmrūd ( دارامرود)) is a village in Itivand-e Jonubi Rural District of Itivand District in Delfan County, Lorestan province, Iran.

== Demographics ==
=== Population ===
At the time of the 2006 National Census, the village's population was 25 in five households, when it was in Kakavand District. The following census in 2011 counted 36 people in seven households. The 2016 census measured the population of the village as 26 people in six households.

In 2022, the rural district was separated from the district in the formation of Itivand District.
