= Basatabad, Delfan =

Village in Lorestan province, Iran

Basatabad Persian: بساطاباد
- Village
- Location within Iran
- Country: Iran
- Province: Lorestan
- County: Delfan
- District: Itivand
- Rural District: Itivand-e Jonubi

Population (2016)
  - Total: 0
- Time zone: UTC+3:30 (IRST)

Basatabad (Persian: بساطاباد) (Note: Also romanized as Basāţābād) is a village in Itivand-e Jonubi Rural District of Itivand District in Delfan County, Lorestan province, Iran.

== Demographics ==
=== Population ===
At the time of the 2006 National Census, the village's population was 72 in 14 households, when it was in Kakavand District. The following census in 2011 counted a population below the reporting threshold. The 2016 census measured the population of the village as zero.

In 2022, the rural district was separated from the district in the formation of Itivand District.
