= Chafteh Darreh-ye Sofla =

Village in Lorestan, Iran

Chafteh Darreh-ye Sofla چفته دره سفلي
- Village
- Location within Iran
- Coordinates: 34°14′48″N 47°45′11″E
- Country: Iran
- Province: Lorestan
- County: Delfan
- Bakhsh: Kakavand
- Rural District: Kakavand-e Sharqi

Population (2006)
  - Total: 194
- Time zone: UTC+3:30 (IRST)
  - Summer (DST): UTC+4:30 (IRDT)

Chafteh Darreh-ye Sofla (Persian: چفته دره سفلي, also Romanized as Chafteh Darreh-ye Soflá) is a village in Kakavand-e Sharqi Rural District, Kakavand District, Delfan County, Lorestan Province, Iran. At the 2006 census, its population was 194, in 36 families.
