= Kahriz-e Varvasht =

Village in Lorestan province, Iran

Kahriz-e Varvasht Persian: كهريز وروشت
- Village
- Location within Iran
- Coordinates: 34°05′00″N 47°43′11″E
- Country: Iran
- Province: Lorestan
- County: Delfan
- District: Itivand
- Rural District: Itivand-e Jonubi

Population (2016)
  - Total: 670
- Time zone: UTC+3:30 (IRST)

Kahriz-e Varvasht (Persian: كهريزوروشت) (Note: Also romanized as Kahrīz-e Varvasht; also known as Kahrīz) is a village in, and the former capital of, Itivand-e Jonubi Rural District in Itivand District of Delfan County, Lorestan province, Iran, serving as capital of the district. The capital of the rural district has been transferred to the village of Sarab-e Qomesh.

== Demographics ==
=== Population ===
At the time of the 2006 National Census, the village's population was 784 in 145 households, when it was in Kakavand District. The following census in 2011 counted 818 people in 186 households. The 2016 census measured the population of the village as 670 people in 176 households, the most populous in its rural district.

In 2022, the rural district was separated from the district in the formation of Itivand District.
