= Seyl Cheshmeh-ye Sofla =

Seyl Cheshmeh-ye Sofla سيل چشمه سفلي
- Village
- Country: Iran
- Province: Lorestan
- County: Delfan
- Bakhsh: Kakavand
- Rural District: Kakavand-e Sharqi

Population (2006)
  - Total: 37
- Time zone: UTC+3:30 (IRST)
  - Summer (DST): UTC+4:30 (IRDT)

Seyl Cheshmeh-ye Sofla (Persian: سيل چشمه سفلي, also Romanized as Seyl Cheshmeh-ye Soflá) is a village in Kakavand-e Sharqi Rural District, Kakavand District, Delfan County, Lorestan Province, Iran. At the 2006 census, its population was 37, in 7 families.
