= Siyaleya =

Village in Lorestan province, Iran

Siyaleya Persian: سياليا
- Village
- Location within Iran
- Coordinates: 34°11′28″N 47°36′34″E
- Country: Iran
- Province: Lorestan
- County: Delfan
- District: Kakavand
- Rural District: Kakavand-e Gharbi

Population (2016)
  - Total: 291
- Time zone: UTC+3:30 (IRST)

Siyaleya (Persian: سياليا) (Note: Also romanized as Sīyāleyā; also known as Siyahleya, Sīyāhleyā, and Sīyāhleylā) is a village in Kakavand-e Gharbi Rural District of Kakavand District in Delfan County, Lorestan province, Iran.

== Demographics ==
=== Population ===
At the time of the 2006 National Census, the village's population was 317 in 47 households. The following census in 2011 counted 344 people in 74 households. The 2016 census measured the population of the village as 291 people in 84 households.
