= Posht Tang-e Dar Vazneh =

Village in Lorestan province, Iran

Posht Tang-e Dar Vazneh Persian: پشت تنگ دروزنه
- Village
- Location within Iran
- Coordinates: 34°15′57″N 47°49′22″E
- Country: Iran
- Province: Lorestan
- County: Delfan
- District: Kakavand
- Rural District: Kakavand-e Sharqi

Population (2016)
  - Total: 217
- Time zone: UTC+3:30 (IRST)

Posht Tang-e Dar Vazneh (Persian: پشت تنگ دروزنه) is a village in Kakavand-e Sharqi Rural District of Kakavand District in Delfan County, Lorestan province, Iran.

== Demographics ==
=== Population ===
At the time of the 2006 National Census, the village's population was 234 in 46 households. The following census in 2011 counted 248 people in 63 households. The 2016 census measured the population of the village as 217 people in 53 households.
