= Badam Shirin, Delfan =

Village in Lorestan province, Iran

Badam Shirin Persian: بادامشيرين
- Village
- Location within Iran
- Coordinates: 34°04′35″N 47°40′26″E
- Country: Iran
- Province: Lorestan
- County: Delfan
- District: Itivand
- Rural District: Itivand-e Jonubi

Population (2016)
  - Total: 98
- Time zone: UTC+3:30 (IRST)

Badam Shirin (Persian: بادامشيرين) (Note: Also romanized as Bādām Shīrīn) is a village in Itivand-e Jonubi Rural District of Itivand District in Delfan County, Lorestan province, Iran.

== Demographics ==
=== Population ===
At the time of the 2006 National Census, the village's population was 139 in 25 households, when it was in Kakavand District. The following census in 2011 counted 105 people in 19 households. The 2016 census measured the population of the village as 98 people in 28 households.

In 2022, the rural district was separated from the district in the formation of Itivand District.
