= Baba Bozorg =

Village in Lorestan province, Iran

Baba Bozorg Persian: بابابزرگ
- Village
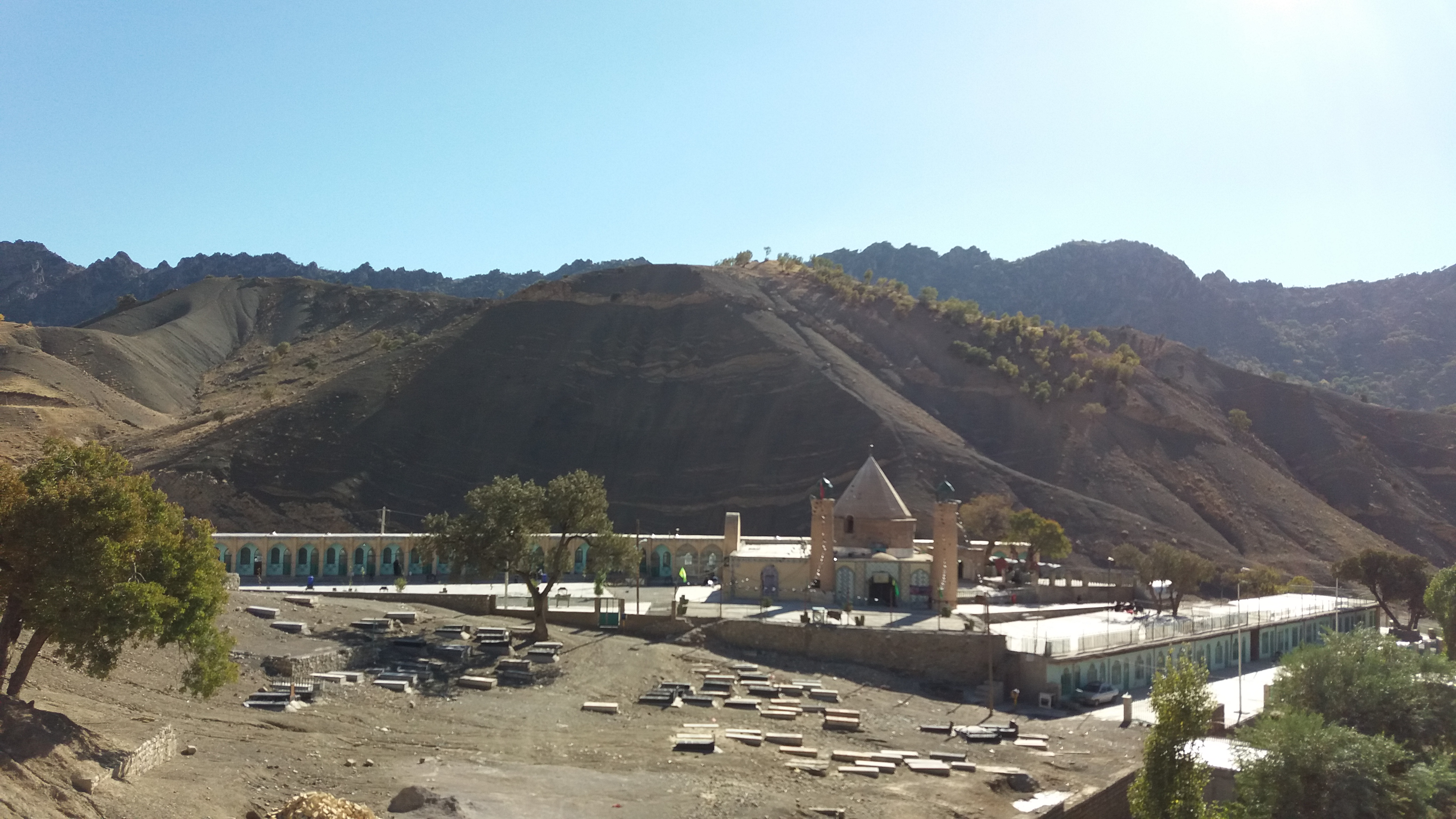
- The village of Baba Bozorg

- Location within Iran
- Coordinates: 33°55′23″N 47°41′43″E
- Country: Iran
- Province: Lorestan
- County: Delfan
- District: Itivand
- Rural District: Itivand-e Jonubi

Population (2016)
  - Total: 101
- Time zone: UTC+3:30 (IRST)

Baba Bozorg (Persian: بابابزرگ) (Note: Also romanized as Bābā Bozorg; also known as Bāba Buzurg, Emāmzādeh Ebrāhīm ( امام زاده ابراهيم), and Emāmzādeh-ye Shāhzādeh Ebrāhīm) is a village in Itivand-e Jonubi Rural District of Itivand District in Delfan County, Lorestan province, Iran.

== Demographics ==
=== Population ===
At the time of the 2006 National Census, the village's population was 117 in 27 households, when it was in Kakavand District. The following census in 2011 counted 55 people in 12 households. The 2016 census measured the population of the village as 61 people in 12 households.

In 2022, the rural district was separated from the district in the formation of Itivand District.
