= Cham Anjir, Delfan =

Cham Anjir چم انجير
- Village
- Location within Iran
- Coordinates: 34°04′00″N 47°33′00″E
- Country: Iran
- Province: Lorestan
- County: Delfan
- Bakhsh: Kakavand
- Rural District: Kakavand-e Gharbi

Population (2006)
  - Total: 105
- Time zone: UTC+3:30 (IRST)
  - Summer (DST): UTC+4:30 (IRDT)

Cham Anjir (Persian: چم انجير, also Romanized as Cham Anjīr) is a village in Kakavand-e Gharbi Rural District, Kakavand District, Delfan County, Lorestan Province, Iran. During the 2006 census, its population was at 105, divided into 20 families.
