= Golestaneh, Delfan =

Village in Lorestan province, Iran

Golestaneh Persian: گلستانه
- Village
- Location within Iran
- Coordinates: 34°09′48″N 47°45′14″E
- Country: Iran
- Province: Lorestan
- County: Delfan
- District: Kakavand
- Rural District: Kakavand-e Sharqi

Population (2016)
  - Total: 439
- Time zone: UTC+3:30 (IRST)

Golestaneh (Persian: گلستانه) (Note: Also romanized as Golestāneh) is a village in Kakavand-e Sharqi Rural District of Kakavand District in Delfan County, Lorestan province, Iran.

== Demographics ==
=== Population ===
At the time of the 2006 National Census, the village's population was 490 in 91 households. The following census in 2011 counted 592 people in 146 households. The 2016 census measured the population of the village as 439 people in 123 households.
