= Sarab-e Qomesh =

Village in Lorestan province, Iran

Sarab-e Qomesh Persian: سراب قمش
- Village
- Location within Iran
- Coordinates: 34°01′22″N 47°48′03″E
- Country: Iran
- Province: Lorestan
- County: Delfan
- District: Itivand
- Rural District: Itivand-e Jonubi

Population (2016)
  - Total: 546
- Time zone: UTC+3:30 (IRST)

Sarab-e Qomesh (Persian: سراب قمش) (Note: Also romanized as Sarāb-e Qomesh; formerly known as Qomesh (قمش), also romanized as Qamesh and Qamsh; also known as Komash, Kumāsh, Qomāsh, Qomish, and Qomīsh) is a village in, and the capital of, Itivand-e Jonubi Rural District in Itivand District of Delfan County, Lorestan province, Iran. The previous capital of the rural district was the village of Kahriz-e Varvasht.

== Demographics ==
=== Population ===
At the time of the 2006 National Census, the village's population, as Qomesh, was 596 in 100 households, when it was in Kakavand District. The following census in 2011 counted 641 people in 140 households, by which time the village was listed as Sarab-e Qomesh. The 2016 census measured the population of the village as 546 people in 135 households.

In 2022, the rural district was separated from the district in the formation of Itivand District.
