= Kamaneh, Lorestan =

Village in Lorestan province, Iran

Kamaneh Persian: کمانه
- Village
- Location within Iran
- Country: Iran
- Province: Lorestan
- County: Delfan
- District: Itivand
- Rural District: Itivand-e Shomali

Population (2016)
  - Total: 90
- Time zone: UTC+3:30 (IRST)

Kamaneh (Persian: کمانه) (Note: Also romanized as Kamāneh; also known as Alfatabad (الفت آباد), also romanized as Ālfatābād) is a village in Itivand-e Shomali Rural District of Itivand District in Delfan County, Lorestan province, Iran.

== Demographics ==
=== Population ===
At the time of the 2006 National Census, the village's population was 114 in 25 households, when it was in Kakavand District. The following census in 2011 counted 109 people in 35 households. The 2016 census measured the population of the village as 90 people in 22 households.

In 2022, the rural district was separated from the district in the formation of Itivand District.
