= Khvoshnam =

Khvoshnam or Khowshnam or Khushnam (Persian: خوشنام) may refer to:

- Khvoshnam, Lorestan
- Khvoshnam, Tehran
- Khvoshnam, Zanjan
