= Cham-e Qalateh =

Village in Lorestan province, Iran

Cham-e Qalateh Persian: چم قلاته
- Village
- Location within Iran
- Coordinates: 34°03′49″N 47°36′48″E
- Country: Iran
- Province: Lorestan
- County: Delfan
- District: Kakavand
- Rural District: Kakavand-e Gharbi

Population (2016)
  - Total: 516
- Time zone: UTC+3:30 (IRST)

Cham-e Qalateh (Persian: چم قلاته) (Note: Also romanized as Cham Qalāteh) is a village in Kakavand-e Gharbi Rural District of Kakavand District in Delfan County, Lorestan province, Iran.

== Demographics ==
=== Population ===
At the time of the 2006 National Census, the village's population was 398 in 71 households. The following census in 2011 counted 414 people in 94 households. The 2016 census measured the population of the village as 516 people in 128 households, the most populous in its rural district.
