= Zardeh Savar, Kakavand =

Village in Lorestan province, Iran

Zardeh Savar Persian: زرده سوار
- Village
- Location within Iran
- Coordinates: 34°13′42″N 47°46′17″E
- Country: Iran
- Province: Lorestan
- County: Delfan
- District: Kakavand
- Rural District: Kakavand-e Sharqi

Population (2016)
  - Total: 239
- Time zone: UTC+3:30 (IRST)

Zardeh Savar (Persian: زرده سوار) (Note: Also romanized as Zardeh Savār) is a village in Kakavand-e Sharqi Rural District of Kakavand District in Delfan County, Lorestan province, Iran.

== Demographics ==
=== Population ===
At the time of the 2006 National Census, the village's population was 326 in 75 households. The following census in 2011 counted 299 people in 76 households. The 2016 census measured the population of the village as 239 people in 73 households.
