= Daramru =

Daramru دارمرو
- Village
- Location within Iran
- Coordinates: 34°10′34″N 47°40′33″E
- Country: Iran
- Province: Lorestan
- County: Delfan
- Bakhsh: Kakavand
- Rural District: Kakavand-e Sharqi

Population (2006)
  - Total: 139
- Time zone: UTC+3:30 (IRST)
  - Summer (DST): UTC+4:30 (IRDT)

Daramru (Persian: دارمرو, also Romanized as Dārāmrū; also known as Daramrud (Persian: دارامرود), also Romanized as Dārāmrūd) is a village in Kakavand-e Sharqi Rural District, Kakavand District, Delfan County, Lorestan Province, Iran. At the 2006 census, its population was 139, in 31 families.
