= Gavmir-e Bala =

Village in Lorestan province, Iran

Gavmir-e Bala Persian: گاو مير بالا
- Village
- Country: Iran
- Province: Lorestan
- County: Delfan
- District: Kakavand
- Rural District: Kakavand-e Gharbi

Population (2016)
  - Total: 194
- Time zone: UTC+3:30 (IRST)

Gavmir-e Bala (Persian: گاو مير بالا) (Note: Also romanized as Gāvmīr-e Bālā; formerly known as Gavmer (گاومر), also romanized as Gāvmer) is a village in Kakavand-e Gharbi Rural District of Kakavand District in Delfan County, Lorestan province, Iran.

== Demographics ==
=== Population ===
At the time of the 2006 National Census, the village's population, as Gavmer, was 126 in 25 households. The following census in 2011 counted 91 people in 21 households, by which time the village was listed as Gavmir-e Bala. The 2016 census measured the population of the village as 194 people in 52 households.
