= Posht-e Meleh Sangar =

Village in Lorestan province, Iran

Posht-e Meleh Sangar Persian: پشت مله سنگر
- Village
- Country: Iran
- Province: Lorestan
- County: Delfan
- District: Itivand
- Rural District: Itivand-e Jonubi

Population (2016)
  - Total: 21
- Time zone: UTC+3:30 (IRST)

Posht-e Meleh Sangar (Persian: پشت مله سنگر) is a village in Itivand-e Jonubi Rural District of Itivand District in Delfan County, Lorestan province, Iran.

== Demographics ==
=== Population ===
At the time of the 2006 National Census, the village's population was 49 in eight households, when it was in Kakavand District. The following census in 2011 counted 25 people in five households. The 2016 census measured the population of the village as 21 people in four households.

In 2022, the rural district was separated from the district in the formation of Itivand District.
