= Sefid Khani, Delfan =

Village in Lorestan province, Iran

Sefid Khani Persian: سفيدخاني
- Village
- Location within Iran
- Coordinates: 33°56′45″N 47°42′06″E
- Country: Iran
- Province: Lorestan
- County: Delfan
- District: Itivand
- Rural District: Itivand-e Jonubi

Population (2016)
  - Total: 384
- Time zone: UTC+3:30 (IRST)

Sefid Khani (Persian: سفيدخاني) (Note: Also romanized as Sefīd Khānī) is a village in Itivand-e Jonubi Rural District of Itivand District in Delfan County, Lorestan province, Iran.

== Demographics ==
=== Population ===
At the time of the 2006 National Census, the village's population was 338 in 58 households, when it was in Kakavand District. The following census in 2011 counted 393 people in 81 households. The 2016 census measured the population of the village as 384 people in 95 households.

In 2022, the rural district was separated from the district in the formation of Itivand District.
