= Burbur-e Vosta =

Burbur-e Vosta بوربوروسطي
- Village
- Location within Iran
- Coordinates: 34°06′01″N 47°33′43″E
- Country: Iran
- Province: Lorestan
- County: Delfan
- Bakhsh: Kakavand
- Rural District: Kakavand-e Gharbi

Population (2006)
  - Total: 38
- Time zone: UTC+3:30 (IRST)
  - Summer (DST): UTC+4:30 (IRDT)

Burbur-e Vosta (Persian: بوربوروسطي, also Romanized as Būrbūr-e Vosţá and Būrbūrā-ye Vosţá; also known as Būrbūrā) is a village in Kakavand-e Gharbi Rural District, Kakavand District, Delfan County, Lorestan Province, Iran. At the 2006 census, its population was 38, in 9 families.
