= Sharafabad-e Bala =

Village in Lorestan province, Iran

Sharafabad-e Bala Persian: شرف ابادبالا
- Village
- Location within Iran
- Coordinates: 34°06′22″N 47°35′12″E
- Country: Iran
- Province: Lorestan
- County: Delfan
- District: Kakavand
- Rural District: Kakavand-e Gharbi

Population (2016)
  - Total: 260
- Time zone: UTC+3:30 (IRST)

Sharafabad-e Bala (Persian: شرف ابادبالا) (Note: Also romanized as Sharafābād-e Bālā; also known as Sharafābād) is a village in Kakavand-e Gharbi Rural District of Kakavand District in Delfan County, Lorestan province, Iran.

== Demographics ==
=== Population ===
At the time of the 2006 National Census, the village's population was 313 in 56 households. The following census in 2011 counted 296 people in 66 households. The 2016 census measured the population of the village as 260 people in 68 households.
