= Cheshmeh Khani, Kakavand =

Village in Lorestan province, Iran

Cheshmeh Khani Persian: چشمه خاني
- Village
- Location within Iran
- Coordinates: 34°04′41″N 47°35′19″E
- Country: Iran
- Province: Lorestan
- County: Delfan
- District: Kakavand
- Rural District: Kakavand-e Gharbi

Population (2016)
  - Total: 237
- Time zone: UTC+3:30 (IRST)

Cheshmeh Khani (Persian: چشمه خاني) (Note: Also romanized as Cheshmeh Khānī) is a village in Kakavand-e Gharbi Rural District of Kakavand District in Delfan County, Lorestan province, Iran.

== Demographics ==
=== Population ===
At the time of the 2006 National Census, the village's population was 279 in 57 households. The following census in 2011 counted 268 people in 60 households. The 2016 census measured the population of the village as 237 people in 60 households.
