= Pain Ab-e Sofla Sharqi =

Pain Ab-e Sofla Sharqi پائين اب سفلي شرقي
- Village
- Location within Iran
- Coordinates: 34°13′21″N 47°49′23″E
- Country: Iran
- Province: Lorestan
- County: Delfan
- Bakhsh: Kakavand
- Rural District: Kakavand-e Sharqi

Population (2006)
  - Total: 81
- Time zone: UTC+3:30 (IRST)
  - Summer (DST): UTC+4:30 (IRDT)

Pain Ab-e Sofla Sharqi (Persian: پائين اب سفلي شرقي, also Romanized as Pā'īn Āb-e Soflá Sharqī; also known as Pā'īnāb-e Pā'īn and Pā'īn Āb-e Soflá) is a village in Kakavand-e Sharqi Rural District, Kakavand District, Delfan County, Lorestan Province, Iran. At the 2006 census, its population was 81, in 19 families.
