= Hezar Khani, Lorestan =

Village in Lorestan province, Iran

Hezar Khani Persian: هزارخاني
- Village
- Location within Iran
- Coordinates: 34°11′44″N 47°47′13″E
- Country: Iran
- Province: Lorestan
- County: Delfan
- District: Kakavand
- Rural District: Kakavand-e Sharqi

Population (2016)
  - Total: 738
- Time zone: UTC+3:30 (IRST)

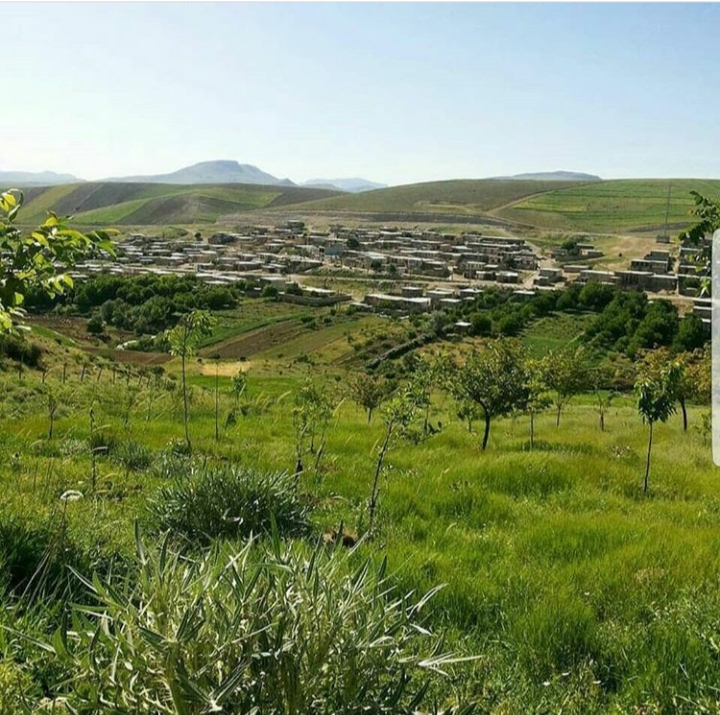
Hezar Khani village

Hezar Khani (Persian: هزارخاني) (Note: Also romanized as Hazār Khānī and Hezār Khānī) is a village in Kakavand-e Sharqi Rural District of Kakavand District in Delfan County, Lorestan province, Iran.

== Demographics ==
=== Population ===
At the time of the 2006 National Census, the village's population was 791 in 149 households. The following census in 2011 counted 800 people in 199 households. The 2016 census measured the population of the village as 738 people in 212 households, the most populous in its rural district.
