= Sefid Khani-ye Kuchek =

Village in Lorestan province, Iran

Sefid Khani-ye Kuchek Persian: سفيدخاني كوچك
- Village
- Location within Iran
- Coordinates: 33°58′00″N 47°40′35″E
- Country: Iran
- Province: Lorestan
- County: Delfan
- District: Itivand
- Rural District: Itivand-e Jonubi

Population (2016)
  - Total: 0
- Time zone: UTC+3:30 (IRST)

Sefid Khani-ye Kuchek (Persian: سفيدخاني كوچك) (Note: Also romanized as Sefīd Khānī-ye Kūchek; also known as Sefīd Khānī) is a village in Itivand-e Jonubi Rural District of Itivand District in Delfan County, Lorestan province, Iran.

== Demographics ==
=== Population ===
At the time of the 2006 National Census, the village's population was 112 in 21 households, when it was in Kakavand District. The 2016 census measured the population of the village as zero.

In 2022, the rural district was separated from the district in the formation of Itivand District.
