= Kuzan =

Kuzan or Kevzan (Persian: کوزان) may refer to:

- Kuzan, Gilan
- Kuzan, Golestan
- Kuzan-e Olya, Lorestan Province
- Kuzan-e Sofla, Lorestan Province
- Kuzan (One Piece), a fictional character
