= Gashur-e Aliabad =

Village in Lorestan province, Iran

Gashur-e Aliabad Persian: گشورعلي اباد
- Village
- Location within Iran
- Coordinates: 34°14′48″N 47°42′11″E
- Country: Iran
- Province: Lorestan
- County: Delfan
- District: Kakavand
- Rural District: Kakavand-e Sharqi

Population (2016)
  - Total: 201
- Time zone: UTC+3:30 (IRST)

Gashur-e Aliabad (Persian: گشورعلي اباد) (Note: Also romanized as Gashūr-e ‘Alīābād) is a village in Kakavand-e Sharqi Rural District of Kakavand District in Delfan County, Lorestan province, Iran.

== Demographics ==
=== Population ===
At the time of the 2006 National Census, the village's population was 273 in 52 households. The following census in 2011 counted 288 people in 71 households. The 2016 census measured the population of the village as 201 people in 66 households.
