= Sormeh =

Village in Lorestan province, Iran

Sormeh Persian: سرمه
- Village
- Location within Iran
- Coordinates: 34°04′48″N 47°36′28″E
- Country: Iran
- Province: Lorestan
- County: Delfan
- District: Kakavand
- Rural District: Kakavand-e Gharbi

Population (2016)
  - Total: 300
- Time zone: UTC+3:30 (IRST)

Sormeh (Persian: سرمه) is a village in Kakavand-e Gharbi Rural District of Kakavand District in Delfan County, Lorestan province, Iran.

== Demographics ==
=== Population ===
At the time of the 2006 National Census, the village's population was 356 in 66 households. The following census in 2011 counted 308 people in 57 households. The 2016 census measured the population of the village as 300 people in 71 households.
