= Haft Cheshmeh, Delfan =

City in Lorestan province, Iran

Haft Cheshmeh Persian: هفت چشمه
- City
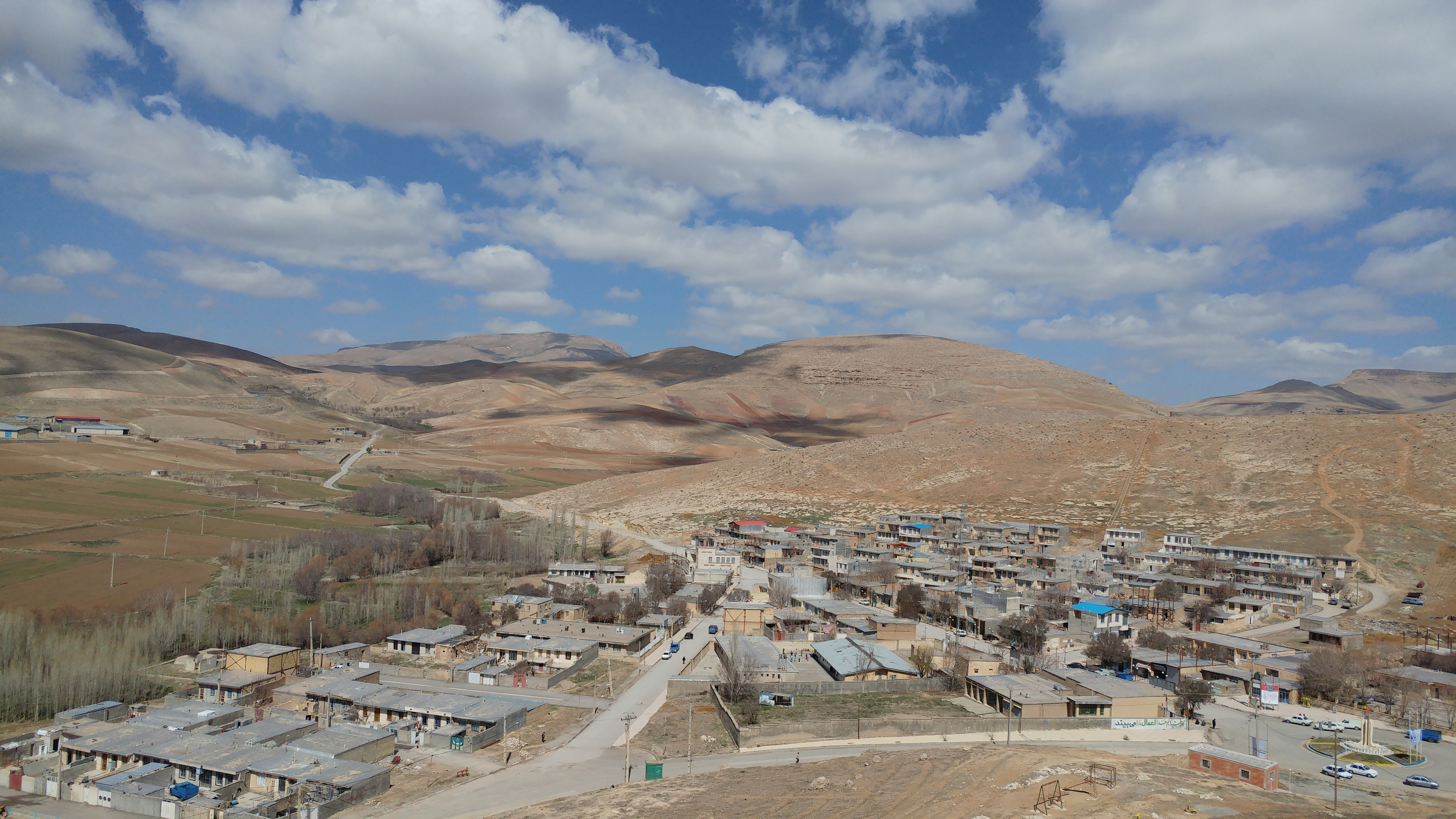
- The city of Haft Cheshmeh

- Location within Iran
- Coordinates: 34°12′28″N 47°45′48″E
- Country: Iran
- Province: Lorestan
- County: Delfan
- District: Kakavand
- Established as a city: 2010

Population (2016)
  - Total: 870
- Time zone: UTC+3:30 (IRST)

Haft Cheshmeh (Persian: هفت چشمه) (Note: Also known as Markazi Bekhesh) is a city in, and the capital of, Kakavand District in Delfan County, Lorestan province, Iran. It also serves as the administrative center for Kakavand-e Sharqi Rural District.

== Demographics ==
=== Population ===
At the time of the 2006 National Census, Haft Cheshmeh's population was 417 in 100 households, when it was a village in Kakavand-e Sharqi Rural District. The following census in 2011 counted 1,048 people in 219 households, by which time the village had been converted to a city. The 2016 census measured the population of the city as 870 people in 279 households.
