= Itivand-e Jonubi Rural District =

Rural district in Lorestan province, Iran

Itivand-e Jonubi Rural District Persian: دهستان ایتیوند جنوبی
- Rural District
- Location within Iran
- Coordinates: 34°00′34″N 47°37′37″E
- Country: Iran
- Province: Lorestan
- County: Delfan
- District: Itivand
- Established: 1987
- Capital: Sarab-e Qomesh

Population (2016)
  - Total: 5,150
- Time zone: UTC+3:30 (IRST)

Itivand-e Jonubi Rural District (Persian: دهستان ایتیوند جنوبی) is in Itivand District of Delfan County, Lorestan province, Iran. Its capital is the village of Sarab-e Qomesh. The previous capital of the rural district was the village of Kahriz-e Varvasht.

== Demographics ==
=== Population ===
At the time of the 2006 National Census, the rural district's population (as a part of Kakavand District) was 6,400 in 1,196 households. There were 5,864 inhabitants in 1,196 households at the following census of 2011. The 2016 census measured the population of the rural district as 5,150 in 1,299 households. The most populous of its 77 villages was Kahriz-e Varvasht, with 670 people.

In 2022, the rural district was separated from the district in the formation of Itivand District.

=== Other villages in the rural district ===
- Alimorad Khan
- Allah Beygi
- Almasabad
- Baba Bozorg
- Baba Julan
- Badam Shirin
- Balut Bazeh
- Basatabad
- Cham Hesar
- Cham Karim
- Cham Mokhtar
- Cherush-e Itivand
- Cheshmeh Kalan
- Cheshmeh Zalikha
- Chiyeh
- Dar Numeh
- Garmeh Khani
- Gavdaneh Pa
- Golestanak
- Hasan Beyg Mordeh
- Heydarabad
- Heydarik
- Jafarabad
- Jafarkhan
- Jai Hatam
- Javadabad
- Khalilabad
- Khvoshnam
- Kulband
- Kuleh Nab
- Nazarabad
- Posht-e Meleh Sangar
- Qeshlaq-e Posht Qala
- Qeshlaq-e Tahsaran
- Riseh Vand
- Salar Dul
- Sefid Khani
- Sefid Khani Ahmedvand
- Sefid Khani-ye Kuchek
- Seyyed Abbas
- Seyyed Ali
- Seyyed Heshmat
- Shah Parvarmordeh
- Tang-e Pari Olya
- Tarikeh-ye Rangrazan
- Tazehabad
- Tazehabad Golestaneh
- Telih
- Tork Amir
- Tunab
- Zafarabad
- Zamgah Zich
- Zardeh Zavar
