= Seyyed Ali, Itivand =

Village in Lorestan province, Iran

Seyyed Ali Persian: سيدعلي
- Village
- Location within Iran
- Coordinates: 34°03′44″N 47°40′36″E
- Country: Iran
- Province: Lorestan
- County: Delfan
- District: Itivand
- Rural District: Itivand-e Jonubi

Population (2016)
  - Total: 139
- Time zone: UTC+3:30 (IRST)

Seyyed Ali (Persian: سيدعلي) (Note: Also romanized as Seyyed ‘Alī; also known as Cham Seyyed Ali (چم سيد علي)) is a village in Itivand-e Jonubi Rural District of Itivand District in Delfan County, Lorestan province, Iran.

== Demographics ==
=== Population ===
At the time of the 2006 National Census, the village's population was 213 in 47 households, when it was in Kakavand District. The following census in 2011 counted 159 people in 36 households. The 2016 census measured the population of the village as 139 people in 40 households.

In 2022, the rural district was separated from the district in the formation of Itivand District.
