= Itivand-e Shomali Rural District =

Rural district in Lorestan province, Iran

Itivand-e Shomali Rural District Persian: دهستان ایتیوند شمالی
- Rural District
- Location within Iran
- Coordinates: 34°09′48″N 47°50′28″E
- Country: Iran
- Province: Lorestan
- County: Delfan
- District: Itivand
- Established: 1987
- Capital: Taqiabad-e Kan Kot

Population (2016)
  - Total: 2,918
- Time zone: UTC+3:30 (IRST)

Itivand-e Shomali Rural District (Persian: دهستان ایتیوند شمالی) is in Itivand District of Delfan County, Lorestan province, Iran. Its capital is the village of Taqiabad-e Kan Kot.

== Demographics ==
=== Population ===
At the time of the 2006 National Census, the rural district's population (as a part of Kakavand District) was 3,126 in 622 households. There were 2,923 inhabitants in 771 households at the following census of 2011. The 2016 census measured the population of the rural district as 2,918 in 833 households. The most populous of its 41 villages was Taqiabad-e Kan Kot, with 382 people.In 2022, the rural district was separated from the district in the formation of Itivand District.

=== Other villages in the rural district ===
- Ahangaran
- Ahangaran-e Pain
- Aliabad
- Aliabad-e Pirdusti
- Azadabad-e Pirdusti
- Azizabad
- Bakbarabad-e Pirdusti
- Chal Seyyed Ali
- Cheshmeh Kabud
- Darkubi
- Darreh Deh
- Darreh Yadegar
- Garkan-e Bala
- Haydarabad
- Kaleh Kaleh-ye Olya
- Kaleh Kaleh-ye Pain
- Kamaneh
- Kamaneh-ye Mirzabeygi
- Khosrow Khani
- Moradabad-e Pirdusti
- Posht Tang-e Dustali
- Qetel Yum
- Sarab-e Pirdusti
- Sarzan
- Shelal-e Ali
- Valiabad Khosrow Khani
- Yaramiri
- Yarvaliabad
- Zarrin Ju
