= Cheshmeh Kizab-e Bala =

Village in Lorestan province, Iran

Cheshmeh Kizab-e Bala Persian: چشمه کيزاب بالا
- Village
- Location within Iran
- Coordinates: 34°07′43″N 47°35′27″E
- Country: Iran
- Province: Lorestan
- County: Delfan
- District: Kakavand
- Rural District: Kakavand-e Gharbi

Population (2016)
  - Total: 194
- Time zone: UTC+3:30 (IRST)

Cheshmeh Kizab-e Bala (Persian: چشمه کيزاب بالا) (Note: Also romanized as Cheshmeh Kīzāb-e Bālā; formerly known as Cheshmeh Kuzan-e Olya (چشمه کوزان عليا), also romanized as Cheshmeh Kūzān-e ‘Olyā; also known as Cheshmeh Kūzān-e Bālā and Kuzan Olya (کوزان عليا), also romanized as Kūzān ‘Olyā) is a village in, and the capital of, Kakavand-e Gharbi Rural District in Kakavand District of Delfan County, Lorestan province, Iran.

== Demographics ==
=== Population ===
At the time of the 2006 National Census, the village's population, as Cheshmeh Kuzan-e Olya, was 279 in 56 households. The following census in 2011 counted 233 people in 53 households, by which time the village was listed as Cheshmeh Kizab-e Bala. The 2016 census measured the population of the village as 194 people in 55 households.
