= Khosrow Khan =

Khosrow Khan may refer to:

- Khosrow Soltan Armani, known as Khosrow Khan (died 1653), Safavid official, military commander, and gholam of Armenian origin
- Khosrow Khan Gorji (1785–1857), eunuch of Armenian origin

== See also ==
- Khosrow Khani (disambiguation)
