= Posht Meleh, Khorramabad =

Posht Meleh پشتمله
- Village
- Location within Iran
- Coordinates: 33°38′14″N 48°25′55″E
- Country: Iran
- Province: Lorestan
- County: Khorramabad
- Bakhsh: Central
- Rural District: Robat

Population (2006)
  - Total: 195
- Time zone: UTC+3:30 (IRST)
  - Summer (DST): UTC+4:30 (IRDT)

Posht Meleh (Persian: پشتمله, also Romanized as Posht Melah) is a village in Robat Rural District, in the Central District of Khorramabad County, Lorestan Province, Iran. At the 2006 census, its population was 195, in 48 families.
