= Burbur, Kermanshah =

Burbur بوربور
- Village
- Location within Iran
- Coordinates: 34°28′21″N 46°39′44″E
- Country: Iran
- Province: Kermanshah
- County: Kermanshah
- Bakhsh: Kuzaran
- Rural District: Sanjabi

Population (2006)
  - Total: 320
- Time zone: UTC+3:30 (IRST)
  - Summer (DST): UTC+4:30 (IRDT)

Burbur (Persian: بوربور, also Romanized as Būrbūr) is a village in Sanjabi Rural District, Kuzaran District, Kermanshah County, Kermanshah Province, Iran. At the 2006 census, its population was 320, in 68 families. The village is on the road to Kermanshah, about 45 km away

Villagers of Fame are:

- Doctor Arash Ebrahimi plasma physics professor at the University of Glasgow
- Assistant Professor Majid Samii mr khodadad salimi doctor and professor at Harvard University
- Farhad Fathi doctor Professor of Neurosurgery at the University of London
