= Sefid Khani-ye Vosta =

Sefid Khani-ye Vosta سفيدخاني وسطي
- Village
- Location within Iran
- Coordinates: 33°39′41″N 46°36′19″E
- Country: Iran
- Province: Ilam
- County: Sirvan
- Bakhsh: Karezan
- Rural District: Zangvan

Population (2006)
  - Total: 47
- Time zone: UTC+3:30 (IRST)
  - Summer (DST): UTC+4:30 (IRDT)

Sefid Khani-ye Vosta (Persian: سفيدخاني وسطي, also Romanized as Sefīd Khānī-ye Vosţá) is a village in Zangvan Rural District, Karezan District, Sirvan County Ilam Province, Iran. At the 2006 census, its population was 47, in 9 families. The village is populated by Kurds.
