= Badam Shirin, Selseleh =

Badam Shirin بادامشيرين
- Village
- Location within Iran
- Coordinates: 33°51′51″N 48°17′57″E
- Country: Iran
- Province: Lorestan
- County: Selseleh
- Bakhsh: Central
- Rural District: Qaleh-ye Mozaffari

Population (2006)
  - Total: 142
- Time zone: UTC+3:30 (IRST)
  - Summer (DST): UTC+4:30 (IRDT)

Badam Shirin (Persian: بادامشيرين, also Romanized as Bādām Shīrīn) is a village in Qaleh-ye Mozaffari Rural District, in the Central District of Selseleh County, Lorestan Province, Iran. At the 2006 census, its population was 142, in 28 families.
