= Idi Guz =

Idi Guz ایدی گوز
- Village
- Location within Iran
- Coordinates: 37°42′25″N 47°50′40″E
- Country: Iran
- Province: East Azerbaijan
- County: Meyaneh
- Bakhsh: Kandovan
- Rural District: Kandovan

Population (2006)
  - Total: 157
- Time zone: UTC+3:30 (IRST)
  - Summer (DST): UTC+4:30 (IRDT)

Idi Guz (Persian: ایدی گوز, also Romanized as Īdī Gūz; also known as Sefīd Khānī and Sefīd Khvānī) is a village in Kandovan Rural District, Kandovan District, Meyaneh County, East Azerbaijan Province, Iran. At the 2006 census, its population was 157, in 31 families.
