= Khosrow Khani, Khorramabad =

Khosrow Khani خسروخاني
- Village
- Location within Iran
- Coordinates: 33°35′39″N 48°37′14″E
- Country: Iran
- Province: Lorestan
- County: Khorramabad
- Bakhsh: Bayravand
- Rural District: Beyranvand-e Jonubi

Population (2006)
  - Total: 88
- Time zone: UTC+3:30 (IRST)
  - Summer (DST): UTC+4:30 (IRDT)

Khosrow Khani (Persian: خسروخاني, also Romanized as Khosrow Khānī and Khusri Khānī) is a village in Beyranvand-e Jonubi Rural District, Bayravand District, Khorramabad County, Lorestan Province, Iran. At the 2006 census, its population was 88, in 15 families.
