= Burbur, Eslamabad-e Gharb =

Burbur بوربور
- Village
- Location within Iran
- Coordinates: 34°06′15″N 46°39′25″E
- Country: Iran
- Province: Kermanshah
- County: Eslamabad-e Gharb
- Bakhsh: Central
- Rural District: Shiyan

Population (2006)
  - Total: 242
- Time zone: UTC+3:30 (IRST)
  - Summer (DST): UTC+4:30 (IRDT)

Burbur (Persian: بوربور, also Romanized as Būrbūr) is a village in Shiyan Rural District, in the Central District of Eslamabad-e Gharb County, Kermanshah Province, Iran. At the 2006 census, its population was 242, in 54 families.
