= Sefid Khani, Gilan =

Sefid Khani سفيدخاني
- Village
- Location within Iran
- Coordinates: 37°02′36″N 49°24′37″E
- Country: Iran
- Province: Gilan
- County: Shaft
- Bakhsh: Ahmadsargurab
- Rural District: Chubar

Population (2006)
  - Total: 139
- Time zone: UTC+3:30 (IRST)
  - Summer (DST): UTC+4:30 (IRDT)

Sefid Khani (Persian: سفيدخاني, also Romanized as Sefīd Khānī) is a village in Chubar Rural District, Ahmadsargurab District, Shaft County, Gilan Province, Iran. At the 2006 census, its population was 139, in 37 families.
