= Cham Anjir, Khorramabad =

Cham Anjir چم انجير
- Village
- Location within Iran
- Coordinates: 33°26′30″N 48°14′55″E
- Country: Iran
- Province: Lorestan
- County: Khorramabad
- Bakhsh: Central
- Rural District: Koregah-e Gharbi

Population (2006)
  - Total: 489
- Time zone: UTC+3:30 (IRST)
  - Summer (DST): UTC+4:30 (IRDT)

Cham Anjir (Persian: چم انجير, also Romanized as Cham Anjīr and Chamanjer) is a village in Koregah-e Gharbi Rural District, in the Central District of Khorramabad County, Lorestan Province, Iran. At the 2006 census, its population was 489, in 96 families.
