= Burbur, West Azerbaijan =

Burbur بوربور
- Village
- Location within Iran
- Coordinates: 37°37′00″N 45°06′32″E
- Country: Iran
- Province: West Azerbaijan
- County: Urmia
- Bakhsh: Central
- Rural District: Bash Qaleh

Population (2006)
  - Total: 133
- Time zone: UTC+3:30 (IRST)
  - Summer (DST): UTC+4:30 (IRDT)

Burbur (Persian: بوربور, also Romanized as Būrbūr) is a village in Bash Qaleh Rural District, in the Central District of Urmia County, West Azerbaijan Province, Iran. At the 2006 census, its population was 133, in 35 families.
