= Jafarkhan, Kurdistan =

Jafarkhan جعفرخان
- Village
- Location within Iran
- Coordinates: 36°01′06″N 46°42′20″E
- Country: Iran
- Province: Kurdistan
- County: Saqqez
- Bakhsh: Ziviyeh
- Rural District: Khvor Khvoreh

Population (2006)
  - Total: 394
- Time zone: UTC+3:30 (IRST)
  - Summer (DST): UTC+4:30 (IRDT)

Jafarkhan (Persian: جعفرخان, also Romanized as Ja‘farkhān; also known as Ja‘far Khānī) is a village in Khvor Khvoreh Rural District, Ziviyeh District, Saqqez County, Kurdistan Province, Iran. At the 2006 census, its population was 394, in 69 families. The village is populated by Kurds.
