= Sefid Khani, Kuhdasht =

Sefid Khani سفيدخاني
- Village
- Location within Iran
- Coordinates: 33°27′37″N 47°29′05″E
- Country: Iran
- Province: Lorestan
- County: Kuhdasht
- Bakhsh: Central
- Rural District: Gol Gol

Population (2006)
  - Total: 336
- Time zone: UTC+3:30 (IRST)
  - Summer (DST): UTC+4:30 (IRDT)

Sefid Khani (Persian: سفيدخاني, also Romanized as Sefīd Khānī) is a village in Gol Gol Rural District, in the Central District of Kuhdasht County, Lorestan Province, Iran. At the 2006 census, its population was 336, in 64 families.
