= Chafteh, Kermanshah =

Chafteh چفته
- Village
- Location within Iran
- Coordinates: 34°14′41″N 46°35′05″E
- Country: Iran
- Province: Kermanshah
- County: Eslamabad-e Gharb
- Bakhsh: Central
- Rural District: Howmeh-ye Shomali

Population (2006)
  - Total: 297
- Time zone: UTC+3:30 (IRST)
  - Summer (DST): UTC+4:30 (IRDT)

Chafteh (Persian: چفته; also known as Chafteh Sanjānī) is a village in Howmeh-ye Shomali Rural District, in the Central District of Eslamabad-e Gharb County, Kermanshah Province, Iran. At the 2006 census, its population was 297, in 64 families.
