= Daramrud-e Sofla =

Village in Kermanshah, Iran

Daramrud-e Sofla دارامرودسفلي
- Village
- Location within Iran
- Coordinates: 34°07′13″N 47°03′54″E
- Country: Iran
- Province: Kermanshah
- County: Kermanshah
- Bakhsh: Firuzabad
- Rural District: Sar Firuzabad

Population (2006)
  - Total: 138
- Time zone: UTC+3:30 (IRST)
  - Summer (DST): UTC+4:30 (IRDT)

Daramrud-e Sofla (Persian: دارامرودسفلي, also Romanized as Dārāmrūd-e Soflá) is a village in Sar Firuzabad Rural District, Firuzabad District, Kermanshah County, Kermanshah Province, Iran. At the 2006 census, its population was 138, in 31 families.
