= Kamaneh, West Azerbaijan =

Kamaneh كمانه
- Village
- Location within Iran
- Coordinates: 37°16′56″N 45°14′52″E
- Country: Iran
- Province: West Azerbaijan
- County: Urmia
- Bakhsh: Central
- Rural District: Dul

Population (2006)
  - Total: 101
- Time zone: UTC+3:30 (IRST)
  - Summer (DST): UTC+4:30 (IRDT)

Kamaneh (Persian: كمانه, also Romanized as Kamāneh) is a village in Dul Rural District, in the Central District of Urmia County, West Azerbaijan Province, Iran. At the 2006 census, its population was 101, in 21 families.
