= Sefid Khani-ye Sofla =

Sefid Khani-ye Sofla سفيدخاني سفلي
- Village
- Location within Iran
- Coordinates: 33°39′21″N 46°36′49″E
- Country: Iran
- Province: Ilam
- County: Sirvan
- Bakhsh: Karezan
- Rural District: Zangvan

Population (2006)
  - Total: 102
- Time zone: UTC+3:30 (IRST)
  - Summer (DST): UTC+4:30 (IRDT)

Sefid Khani-ye Sofla (Persian: سفيدخاني سفلي, also Romanized as Sefīd Khānī-ye Soflá; also known as Sar Kalak and Sar Koleh) is a village in Zangvan Rural District, Karezan District, Sirvan County, Ilam Province, Iran. At the 2006 census, its population was 102, in 17 families. The village is populated by Kurds.
