= Daramrud-e Olya =

Village in Kermanshah, Iran

Daramrud-e Olya دارامرودعليا
- Village
- Location within Iran
- Coordinates: 34°07′00″N 47°04′29″E
- Country: Iran
- Province: Kermanshah
- County: Kermanshah
- Bakhsh: Firuzabad
- Rural District: Sar Firuzabad

Population (2006)
  - Total: 126
- Time zone: UTC+3:30 (IRST)
  - Summer (DST): UTC+4:30 (IRDT)

Daramrud-e Olya (Persian: دارامرودعليا, also Romanized as Dārāmrūd-e 'Olyā) is a village in Sar Firuzabad Rural District, Firuzabad District, Kermanshah County, Kermanshah province, Iran. At the 2006 census, its population was 126, in 28 families.
