= Sefid Khani, Kerman =

Sefid Khani سفيدخاني
- Village
- Location within Iran
- Coordinates: 28°31′35″N 56°40′34″E
- Country: Iran
- Province: Kerman
- County: Arzuiyeh
- Bakhsh: Central
- Rural District: Dehsard

Population (2006)
  - Total: 134
- Time zone: UTC+3:30 (IRST)
  - Summer (DST): UTC+4:30 (IRDT)

Sefid Khani (Persian: سفيدخاني, also Romanized as Sefīd Khānī) is a village in Dehsard Rural District, in the Central District of Arzuiyeh County, Kerman Province, Iran. At the 2006 census, its population was 134, in 38 families.
