= Seyyed Ali, Delfan =

Seyyed Ali صيدعلي
- Village
- Location within Iran
- Coordinates: 34°10′41″N 47°59′56″E
- Country: Iran
- Province: Lorestan
- County: Delfan
- Bakhsh: Central
- Rural District: Nurali

Population (2006)
  - Total: 214
- Time zone: UTC+3:30 (IRST)
  - Summer (DST): UTC+4:30 (IRDT)

Seyyed Ali (Persian: صيدعلي, also Romanized as Seyyed ‘Alī, Şeyd‘alī, and Şeyd ‘Alī) is a village in Nurali Rural District, in the Central District of Delfan County, Lorestan Province, Iran. At the 2006 census, its population was 214, in 50 families.
