= Daram Rud, Kurdistan =

Daram Rud دارامرود
- Village
- Location within Iran
- Coordinates: 34°56′55″N 47°08′06″E
- Country: Iran
- Province: Kurdistan
- County: Kamyaran
- Bakhsh: Muchesh
- Rural District: Sursur

Population (2006)
  - Total: 43
- Time zone: UTC+3:30 (IRST)
  - Summer (DST): UTC+4:30 (IRDT)

Daram Rud (Persian: دارامرود, also Romanized as Dāram Rūd and Dāramrūd) is a village in Sursur Rural District, Muchesh District, Kamyaran County, Kurdistan Province, Iran. At the 2006 census, its population was 43, in 14 families. The village is populated by Kurds.
