= Kakavand-e Gharbi Rural District =

Rural district in Lorestan province, Iran

Kakavand-e Gharbi Rural District Persian: دهستان كاكاوند غربي
- Rural District
- Location within Iran
- Coordinates: 34°08′N 47°34′E
- Country: Iran
- Province: Lorestan
- County: Delfan
- District: Kakavand
- Established: 1987
- Capital: Cheshmeh Kizab-e Bala

Population (2016)
  - Total: 4,611
- Time zone: UTC+3:30 (IRST)

Kakavand-e Gharbi Rural District (Persian: دهستان كاكاوند غربي) is in Kakavand District of Delfan County, Lorestan province, Iran. Its capital is the village of Cheshmeh Kizab-e Bala.

== Demographics ==
=== Population ===
At the time of the 2006 National Census, the rural district's population was 5,831 in 1,041 households. There were 5,044 inhabitants in 1,110 households at the following census of 2011. The 2016 census measured the population of the rural district as 4,611 in 1,200 households. The most populous of its 70 villages was Cham-e Qalateh, with 516 people.

=== Other villages in the rural district ===
- Cheshmeh Khani
- Danah Misi
- Gavmir-e Bala
- Sharafabad-e Bala
- Siyaleya
- Sormeh
