= Kakavand-e Sharqi Rural District =

Rural district in Lorestan province, Iran

Kakavand-e Sharqi Rural District Persian: دهستان كاكاوند شرقي
- Rural District
- Location within Iran
- Coordinates: 34°14′44″N 47°46′10″E
- Country: Iran
- Province: Lorestan
- County: Delfan
- District: Kakavand
- Established: 1987
- Capital: Haft Cheshmeh

Population (2016)
  - Total: 5,578
- Time zone: UTC+3:30 (IRST)

Kakavand-e Sharqi Rural District (Persian: دهستان كاكاوند شرقي) is in Kakavand District of Delfan County, Lorestan province, Iran. It is administered from the city of Haft Cheshmeh.

== Demographics ==
=== Population ===
At the time of the 2006 National Census, the rural district's population was 8,241 in 1,715 households. There were 6,958 inhabitants in 1,786 households at the following census of 2011. The 2016 census measured the population of the rural district as 5,578 in 1,673 households. The most populous of its 94 villages was Hezar Khani, with 738 people.

=== Other villages in the rural district ===
- Chaman Buleh
- Gashur-e Aliabad
- Golestaneh
- Posht Tang-e Dar Vazneh
- Qazi Khani
- Zardeh Savar
- Zargaran
