= Itivand District =

District in Lorestan province, Iran

Itivand District Persian: بخش ایتیوند
- District
- Location within Iran
- Coordinates: 34°03′N 47°42′E
- Country: Iran
- Province: Lorestan
- County: Delfan
- Established: 2022
- Capital: Kahriz-e Varvasht
- Time zone: UTC+3:30 (IRST)

Itivand District (Persian: بخش ایتیوند) is in Delfan County, Lorestan province, Iran. Its capital is the village of Kahriz-e Varvasht, whose population at the time of the 2016 National Census was 670 people in 176 households.

== History ==
In 2022, Itivand-e Jonubi and Itivand-e Shomali Rural Districts were separated from Kakavand District in the formation of Itivand District.

== Demographics ==
=== Administrative divisions ===
Itivand District
Administrative Divisions
Itivand-e Jonubi RD
Itivand-e Shomali RD
RD = Rural District
