= Kakavand District =

District in Lorestan province, Iran

Kakavand District Persian: بخش کاکاوند
- District
- Location within Iran
- Coordinates: 34°13′N 47°40′E
- Country: Iran
- Province: Lorestan
- County: Delfan
- Established: 1989
- Capital: Haft Cheshmeh

Population (2016)
  - Total: 19,127
- Time zone: UTC+3:30 (IRST)

Kakavand District (Persian: بخش کاکاوند) is in Delfan County, Lorestan province, Iran. Its capital is the city of Haft Cheshmeh.

== History ==
The village of Haft Cheshmeh was converted to a city in 2010. In 2022, Itivand-e Jonubi and Itivand-e Shomali Rural Districts were separated from the district in the formation of Itivand District.

== Demographics ==
At the time of the 2006 National Census, the district's population was 23,598 in 4,574 households. The following census in 2011 counted 21,837 people in 5,172 households. The 2016 census measured the population of the district as 19,127 inhabitants in 5,284 households.

Kakavand District Population
Administrative Divisions	2006	2011	2016
Itivand-e Jonubi RD (Note: Transferred to Itivand District after the 2016 census)	6,400	5,864	5,150
Itivand-e Shomali RD	3,126	2,923	2,918
Kakavand-e Gharbi RD	5,831	5,044	4,611
Kakavand-e Sharqi RD	8,241	6,958	5,578
Haft Cheshmeh (city)		1,048	870
Total	23,598	21,837	19,127
RD = Rural District
