= Cheshmeh Khani =

Cheshmeh Khani (Persian: چشمه خاني) may refer to:

- Cheshmeh Khani, Chaharmahal and Bakhtiari
- Cheshmeh Khani, Kermanshah
- Cheshmeh Khani, Kohgiluyeh and Boyer-Ahmad
- Cheshmeh Khani, Delfan, a village in Delfan County, Lorestan Province, Iran
- Cheshmeh Khani, Kakavand, a village in Delfan County, Lorestan Province, Iran
- Cheshmeh Khani-ye Olya, a village in Delfan County, Lorestan Province, Iran
- Cheshmeh Khani-ye Sofla, a village in Delfan County, Lorestan Province, Iran
