= Gav Kosh =

Gav Kosh (Persian: گاوكش) may refer to:

- Gav Kosh-e Olya
- Gav Kosh-e Sofla
- Gav Kosh-e Vosta

== See also ==
- Gavkosh (disambiguation)
