= Mirza =

Mirza may refer to:

- Mirza (name), a name derived from a historical royal and noble title
- Mirza (lemur), a genus of giant mouse lemurs
- "Mirza", a 1965 French-language song by Nino Ferrer
- Mirza, Kamrup, a town in Assam, India
- Mirza melon, a melon cultivar
- Mirza, title character of the Punjabi tragic romance Mirza Sahiban
  - Mirza Sahiban (1947 film), an Indian film adaptation by K. Amarnath
  - Mirzya (film), a 2016 Indian film adaptation by Rakeysh Omprakash Mehra
    - Mirzya (soundtrack), its soundtrack by Shankar–Ehsaan–Loy and Daler Mehndi
  - Mirza Part Two, a 1997 EP by Panjabi MC

== See also ==
- Mirzai (disambiguation)
- Mirzapur (disambiguation)
- Mirza Ghalib (disambiguation)
- Mirzayev, a surname
