= Bagverdi =

Bagverdi (Persian: بگوردي) may refer to:

- Bagverdi-ye Olya
- Bagverdi-ye Sofla
- Bagverdi-ye Vosta
