= Taj Amir =

Village in Lorestan province, Iran

Taj Amir Persian: تاج امير
- Village
- Location within Iran
- Coordinates: 34°01′18″N 48°09′47″E
- Country: Iran
- Province: Lorestan
- County: Delfan
- District: Khaveh
- Rural District: Khaveh-ye Jonubi

Population (2016)
  - Total: 902
- Time zone: UTC+3:30 (IRST)

Taj Amir (Persian: تاج امير) (Note: Also romanized as Tāj Amīr) is a village in Khaveh-ye Jonubi Rural District of Khaveh District in Delfan County, Lorestan province, Iran.

== Demographics ==
=== Population ===
At the time of the 2006 National Census, the village's population was 829 in 207 households, when it was in the Central District. The following census in 2011 counted 853 people in 250 households. The 2016 census measured the population of the village as 902 people in 275 households, by which time the rural district had been separated from the district in the formation of Khaveh District.
