= Aliabad Cheragh =

Village in Lorestan province, Iran

Aliabad Cheragh Persian: علي آباد چراغ
- Village
- Location within Iran
- Coordinates: 34°02′10″N 48°09′32″E
- Country: Iran
- Province: Lorestan
- County: Delfan
- District: Khaveh
- Rural District: Khaveh-ye Jonubi

Population (2016)
  - Total: 147
- Time zone: UTC+3:30 (IRST)

Aliabad Cheragh (Persian: علي آباد چراغ) (Note: Also romanized as ‘Alīābād Cherāgh; also known as ‘Alīābād) is a village in Khaveh-ye Jonubi Rural District of Khaveh District in Delfan County, Lorestan province, Iran.

== Demographics ==
=== Population ===
At the time of the 2006 National Census, the village's population was 139 in 32 households, when it was in the Central District. The following census in 2011 counted 143 people in 37 households. The 2016 census measured the population of the village as 147 people in 47 households, by which time the rural district had been separated from the district in the formation of Khaveh District.
