= Mohammadabad, Delfan =

Village in Lorestan province, Iran

Mohammadabad Persian: محمداباد
- Village
- Location within Iran
- Coordinates: 34°02′37″N 48°09′39″E
- Country: Iran
- Province: Lorestan
- County: Delfan
- District: Khaveh
- Rural District: Khaveh-ye Jonubi

Population (2016)
  - Total: 117
- Time zone: UTC+3:30 (IRST)

Mohammadabad (Persian: محمداباد) (Note: Also romanized as Moḩammadābād) is a village in Khaveh-ye Jonubi Rural District of Khaveh District in Delfan County, Lorestan province, Iran.

== Demographics ==
=== Population ===
At the time of the 2006 National Census, the village's population was 136 in 24 households, when it was in the Central District. The following census in 2011 counted 120 people in 31 households. The 2016 census measured the population of the village as 117 people in 34 households, by which time the rural district had been separated from the district in the formation of Khaveh District.
