= Alefsaneh =

Village in Lorestan province, Iran

Alefsaneh Persian: الفسانه
- Village
- Location within Iran
- Coordinates: 34°01′34″N 48°11′28″E
- Country: Iran
- Province: Lorestan
- County: Delfan
- District: Khaveh
- Rural District: Khaveh-ye Jonubi

Population (2016)
  - Total: 552
- Time zone: UTC+3:30 (IRST)

Alefsaneh (Persian: الفسانه) (Note: Also romanized as Alefsāneh; also known as Alnesāneh) is a village in Khaveh-ye Jonubi Rural District of Khaveh District in Delfan County, Lorestan province, Iran.

== Demographics ==
=== Population ===
At the time of the 2006 National Census, the village's population was 632 in 151 households, when it was in the Central District. The following census in 2011 counted 626 people in 165 households. The 2016 census measured the population of the village as 552 people in 171 households, by which time the rural district had been separated from the district in the formation of Khaveh District.
