= Karamalahi, Delfan =

Village in Lorestan province, Iran

Karamalahi Persian: كرم الهي
- Village
- Location within Iran
- Coordinates: 34°05′28″N 48°05′36″E
- Country: Iran
- Province: Lorestan
- County: Delfan
- District: Khaveh
- Rural District: Khaveh-ye Shomali

Population (2016)
  - Total: 116
- Time zone: UTC+3:30 (IRST)

Karamalahi (Persian: كرم الهي) (Note: Also romanized as Karam Allāhī, Karamālahī, and Karamelāhī; also known as Karamollāh) is a village in Khaveh-ye Shomali Rural District of Khaveh District in Delfan County, Lorestan province, Iran.

== Demographics ==
=== Population ===
At the time of the 2006 National Census, the village's population was 205 in 46 households, when it was in the Central District. The following census in 2011 counted 162 people in 41 households. The 2016 census measured the population of the village as 116 people in 29 households, by which time the rural district had been separated from the district in the formation of Khaveh District.
