= NETES Institute of Technology and Science Mirza =

Engineering college in India

NETES Institute of Technology & Science Mirza
- Logo
- Other name: NITS Mirza
- Motto in English: "Practice Leads to Perfection"
- Type: Private
- Established: 2009 (17 years ago)
- Academic affiliations: Assam Science and Technology University
- Principal: Ashim kumar Deb Roy a
- Faculty: 60
- Undergraduates: 700 (approx)
- Location: Mirza, Kamrup, Assam, India; 26°11′14″N 91°41′30″E
- Campus: Suburban,20 acres (8.1 ha)
- Colours: Blue and cream
- Website: www.nitsmirza.ac.in

NETES Institute of Technology & Science Mirza (abbreviated as NITS Mirza) is a private engineering college which started in 2009 and is located in Mirza, 6 km (3.7 mi) from Lokapriya Gopinath Bordoloi International Airport, Guwahati, Assam, India. The college is approved by the All India Council for Technical Education.

The college offers Bachelor of Engineering (BE) and Bachelor of Technology (BTech) courses in computer science and engineering, electrical and electronic engineering, electronics and communication engineering, mechanical engineering and civil engineering under affiliation to Gauhati University, the first university of North East India and Assam Science and Technology University.

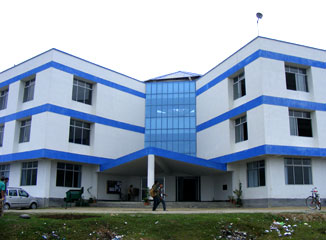
NITS Mirza Main Building

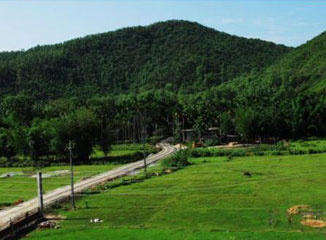
The approach road to NITS Mirza

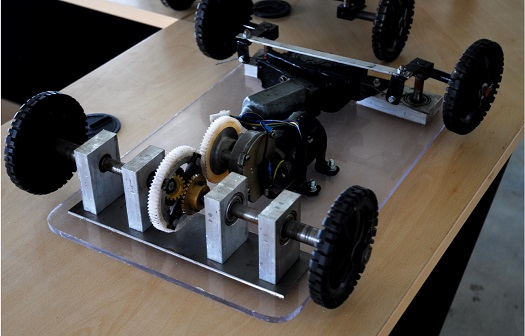
Robotics Lab

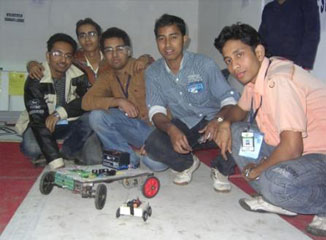
Robotics Club

== Location ==
Mirza is an emerging township on the National Highway 37, located 28 km (17 mi) from the city centre of Guwahati and 6 km (3.7 mi) from the Lokapriya Gopinath Bordoloi International Airport, Guwahati. Nestled amidst green surroundings, NITS Mirza is on a 20-acre (8.1 ha) campus.

== Campus ==
In the first phase of development, NITS Mirza started in 2009 with an intake of 200 students in four branches of engineering, a 6,000 sq ft (560 m^{2}) library, a 3,000 sq ft (280 m^{2}) computer centre, a 9,000 sq ft (840 m^{2}) workshop, laboratories, classrooms, and a 100,000 sq ft (9,300 m^{2}) playground for outdoor games, and a gym.

== Organization and administration ==
NITS Mirza is governed by a governing body, constituted in accordance with the AICTE guidelines composed of academic leaders, NETES members, and nominees of AICTE, Assam Government, Gauhati University, and the industry. The Principal is the administrative and academic head of the institute.

=== About NETES ===
The North East Technical Education Society (NETES) was formed in 2005 by a group of individuals drawn from academia, industry, business and social enterprises. While most of the members are post-graduates and Ph.Ds from the IITs and Assam Engineering College, the society has a few NRIs and past Directors and Chairmen of national bodies as Associate Advisors of the Society.

=== Collaborations ===
Synopsys, Inc., a provider of software and IP for semiconductor design, verification and manufacturing has partnered with NITS Mirza to establish one of its five Regional Centres of Excellence in India at NITS Mirza for its VLSI design curriculum.

A computing environment coupled with remote learning facilities from experts and remote access laboratory practices has been created at NITS Mirza in association with Seer Akademi with the use of Synopsys software tools and IC design flow, and access to faculty.

NITS Mirza has also partnered with Springhive Labs Private Limited, Guwahati to develop Paryavaran Monitoring System, an environmental monitoring hardware board and web service to connect people with their environment and their locality to create more effective and optimised relationships between resources, technology, communities, services and events in their environment.

== Departments ==
- Department of Electronics and Communications Engineering
- Department of Computer Science and Engineering
- Department of Mechanical Engineering
- Department of Electrical and Electronics Engineering
- Department of Civil Engineering

== Research and Development (R&D) ==
=== RemoteLab ===
The RemoteLab of NITS Mirza will enable students to access experiments and tutorials via internet.

The remote lab project will give technical education and practical experimentation remotely, over internet. Users control electronic instruments and modify experiment parameters, using a browser on the internet.

The remote lab will be a platform that can be used by technical institutes to plug in their experiments and demonstrations and broadcast to participating schools and colleges.

=== Robotics Lab ===
A sophisticated Robotics and embedded systems training center is equipped to provide students the opportunity to learn hands-on. Robotic workshops, step by step practical approach to designing and making electronics and communication systems required to create autonomous and guided robots are organized periodically. The lab has over 50 robotic platforms on which students are involved in design and implementation of circuits for vehicle guidance, navigation, and collision detection.

=== Bhola Nath Saikia Advanced Communication Research Centre ===
The Bhola Nath Saikia Advanced Communication Research Centre has been established at NITS Mirza with R&D infrastructure to work on areas such as computer to computer wireless communication, broadband, and digital modulation. These teaching aids will be available to all schools and colleges all over the country and possibly abroad, through the concept of the Remote Lab, which already has been functional at NITS Mirza.

=== Paryavaran Monitoring ===
NITS Mirza in collaboration with Springhive Labs Private Limited is now pioneering Paryavaran Monitoring – a network of school weather stations of NITS Mirza in order to collect local environmental parameters through schools over the North Eastern Region. The objective is to create a network of local weather monitoring units at the same time enabling students to assemble, operate, and maintain gadgets to monitor and transmit weather parameters.

Equipment to measure temperature and humidity would be supplied to the schools by NITS Mirza free of cost. In the second phase equipment for measurement of rainfall and wind speed would be added. Gadgets for other weather parameters would be added gradually some of which, e.g. a gadget for recording and transmitting sound level including that of thunderstorm, would be assembled by the students in workshops to be organised at NITS Mirza. Weather data will be uploaded to the NITS Mirza data compiler through the internet.

Paryavaran Monitoring was launched by Shri Tarun Gogoi, Chief Minister of Assam during SASTRICAS 2012 -The First Techno Cultural festival of NITS Mirza during March 2012.

== Hostels ==
NITS Mirza is a fully residential campus. The NITS Mirza Students' Community fosters co-curricular activities for the welfare of students during their stay on the campus.

The majority of students live in hostels in the campus. The hostels are named after tributaries of Assam: Dihang, Kapili (girl's hostel), Chandubi (girl's hostel), Deepor (girl's hostel). Among these hostels Deepor and Chandubi are located outside the campus. Dihang has two blocks viz Dihang I and Dihang II. Dihang and Kapili has a common mess.

== Student activities ==
=== Sports ===
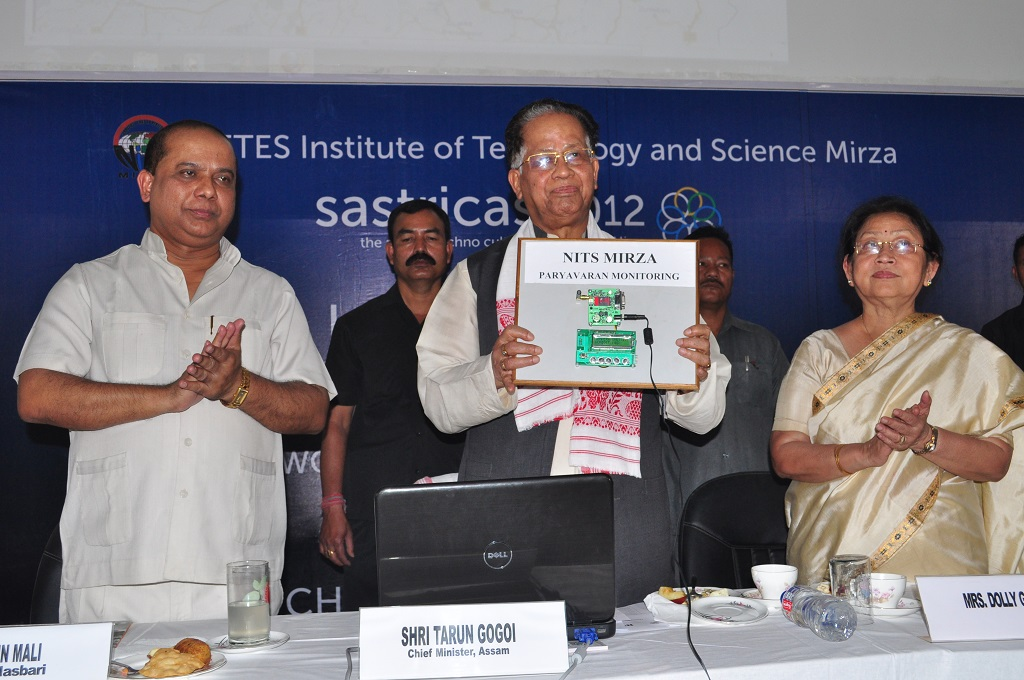
Tarun Gogoi launching Paryavaran Monitoring Network at NITS Mirza during Sastricas '12

The institute's sports facilities include football ground, cricket ground, volleyball courts, basketball court (under construction) and a gym. Every year students participate in an Inter-College Sports Meet (only technical institutions) organize by North East Forum For Technical Institutions.

In November, 2012 NITS Mirza emerged champions in the first NEFTi Volleyball Tournament organized by NEFTi at Regional Institute of Science & Technology (RIST), Meghalaya. The college also emerged runners-up in the First NEFTi T-20 Cricket Tournament earlier in March 2012.

=== Sastricas: Annual Techno-Cultural Fest ===
Sastricas is the annual techno-cultural festival of NITS Mirza. Sastricas provides students from schools and colleges across Northeast India a platform to display their skills and ideas. Sastricas ’12 was held from 23 March to 25 March. It has been attended by National Award-winning innovator Uddhab Bharali, Internationally acclaimed astronomer and Director of M.P Birla Planetarium, Kolkota, Dr. Debiprosad Duari. Shri Tarun Gogoi, chief minister of Assam inaugurated Paryavaran Monitoring - a network of school weather stations during Sastricas '12.

Sastricas ’15 was held from 3–5 April 2015.
