= Eslamabad Gamasyab =

Eslamabad Gamasyab (Persian: اسلام آباد گاماسياب) may refer to:

- Eslamabad Gamasyab Olya
- Eslamabad Gamasyab Sofla
