= Kaleh Jub, Delfan =

Village in Lorestan province, Iran

Kaleh Jub Persian: كله جوب
- Village
- Location within Iran
- Coordinates: 34°04′52″N 48°05′06″E
- Country: Iran
- Province: Lorestan
- County: Delfan
- District: Khaveh
- Rural District: Khaveh-ye Shomali

Population (2016)
  - Total: Below reporting threshold
- Time zone: UTC+3:30 (IRST)

Kaleh Jub (Persian: كله جوب) (Note: Also romanized as Kaleh Jūb and Koleh Jūb; also known as Kaleh Jūvī, Kaleh Jūy, and Kalleh Joo) is a village in Khaveh-ye Shomali Rural District of Khaveh District in Delfan County, Lorestan province, Iran.

== Demographics ==
=== Population ===
At the time of the 2006 National Census, the village's population was 33 in eight households, when it was in the Central District. The following censuses in 2011 and 2016 counted a population below the reporting threshold, by which time the rural district had been separated from the district in the formation of Khaveh District.
