= Azizabad, Khaveh =

Village in Lorestan province, Iran

Azizabad Persian: عزيزاباد
- Village
- Location within Iran
- Coordinates: 34°06′16″N 48°02′02″E
- Country: Iran
- Province: Lorestan
- County: Delfan
- District: Khaveh
- Rural District: Khaveh-ye Shomali

Population (2016)
  - Total: 110
- Time zone: UTC+3:30 (IRST)

Azizabad (Persian: عزيزاباد) (Note: Also romanized as ‘Azīzābād) is a village in Khaveh-ye Shomali Rural District of Khaveh District in Delfan County, Lorestan province, Iran.

== Demographics ==
=== Population ===
At the time of the 2006 National Census, the village's population was 140 in 34 households, when it was in the Central District. The following census in 2011 counted 166 people in 51 households. The 2016 census measured the population of the village as 110 people in 31 households, by which time the rural district had been separated from the district in the formation of Khaveh District.
