= Moradabad, Khaveh-ye Jonubi =

Village in Lorestan province, Iran

Moradabad Persian: مراداباد
- Village
- Location within Iran
- Country: Iran
- Province: Lorestan
- County: Delfan
- District: Khaveh
- Rural District: Khaveh-ye Jonubi

Population (2016)
  - Total: 75
- Time zone: UTC+3:30 (IRST)

Moradabad (Persian: مراداباد) (Note: Also romanized as Morādābād; also known as Ḩasanābād, Ḩasanābād-e Bālā, and Ḩasanābād-e Morādābād) is a village in Khaveh-ye Jonubi Rural District of Khaveh District in Delfan County, Lorestan province, Iran.

== Demographics ==
=== Population ===
At the time of the 2006 National Census, the village's population was 62 in 15 households, when it was in the Central District. The following census in 2011 counted 69 people in 21 households. The 2016 census measured the population of the village as 75 people in 24 households, by which time the rural district had been separated from the district in the formation of Khaveh District.
