= Shotor Khoft =

Village in Lorestan province, Iran

Shotor Khoft Persian: شترخفت
- Village
- Location within Iran
- Coordinates: 34°05′32″N 48°02′44″E
- Country: Iran
- Province: Lorestan
- County: Delfan
- District: Khaveh
- Rural District: Khaveh-ye Shomali

Population (2016)
  - Total: 705
- Time zone: UTC+3:30 (IRST)

Shotor Khoft (Persian: شترخفت) is a village in Khaveh-ye Shomali Rural District of Khaveh District in Delfan County, Lorestan province, Iran.

== Demographics ==
=== Population ===
At the time of the 2006 National Census, the village's population was 703 in 162 households, when it was in the Central District. The following census in 2011 counted 882 people in 226 households. The 2016 census measured the population of the village as 705 people in 192 households, by which time the rural district had been separated from the district in the formation of Khaveh District.
