= Berahma =

Village in Lorestan province, Iran

Berahma Persian: برهما
- Village
- Location within Iran
- Coordinates: 34°01′36″N 48°10′01″E
- Country: Iran
- Province: Lorestan
- County: Delfan
- District: Khaveh
- Rural District: Khaveh-ye Jonubi

Population (2016)
  - Total: 708
- Time zone: UTC+3:30 (IRST)

Berahma (Persian: برهما) (Note: Also romanized as Berahmā; also knowwn as Barāmu, Barumo, Bārūmū, and Bormā) is a village in Khaveh-ye Jonubi Rural District of Khaveh District in Delfan County, Lorestan province, Iran.

== Demographics ==
=== Population ===
At the time of the 2006 National Census, the village's population was 632 in 136 households, when it was in the Central District. The following census in 2011 counted 691 people in 183 households. The 2016 census measured the population of the village as 708 people in 203 households, by which time the rural district had been separated from the district in the formation of Khaveh District.
