= Ali Mirzai-ye Sofla =

Village in Lorestan province, Iran

Ali Mirzai-ye Sofla Persian: علی میرزایی سفلی
- Village
- Location within Iran
- Coordinates: 34°02′50″N 48°07′39″E
- Country: Iran
- Province: Lorestan
- County: Delfan
- District: Khaveh
- Rural District: Khaveh-ye Jonubi

Population (2016)
  - Total: 292
- Time zone: UTC+3:30 (IRST)

Ali Mirzai-ye Sofla (Persian: علی میرزایی سفلی) (Note: Also romanized as 'Alī Mīrzā'ī-ye Soflā) is a village in Khaveh-ye Jonubi Rural District of Khaveh District in Delfan County, Lorestan province, Iran.

== Etymology ==
The village name combines a personal name (Ali Mirzai) with the Persian suffix sofla (سفلی), meaning "lower." This distinguishes it from the nearby village of Ali Mirzai-ye Olya ("Upper Ali Mirzai"), which had a population of 378 at the 2006 National Census. Such paired village names using "Olya" (upper) and "Sofla" (lower) are common throughout Iran, typically indicating settlements at different elevations along a slope or valley.

== Demographics ==
=== Language and religion ===
The inhabitants of Delfan County predominantly speak the Laki language, which is one of the most important languages in western Iran. Vladimir Minorsky, writing in the Encyclopaedia of Islam, referred to the Lak as "the most southern group of Kurd tribes in Persia" based on the linguistic fieldwork of German linguist Oskar Mann. The majority of the Laks are followers of Shia Islam, while a considerable number around the cities of Sahneh and Nurabad follow the Yaresan (also known as Ahl-e Haqq) faith.

=== Population ===
At the time of the 2006 census, the village's population was 251 in 54 households, when it was in the Central District. The following census in 2011 counted 238 people in 59 households. The 2016 census measured the population of the village as 292 people in 87 households, by which time the rural district had been separated from the district in the formation of Khaveh District.

== Geography ==
Ali Mirzai-ye Sofla is located in the northwestern part of Lorestan Province, in the mountainous terrain of the Zagros Mountains. Delfan County is characterized by rugged mountain landscape, with its capital Nurabad situated at over 2,000 metres (6,600 ft) above sea level, making it one of the highest cities in Iran with very cold winters.
