= Aliabad-e Gavkosh =

Village in Lorestan province, Iran

Aliabad-e Gavkosh Persian: علي اباد گاوكش
- Village
- Location within Iran
- Coordinates: 34°00′44″N 48°06′30″E
- Country: Iran
- Province: Lorestan
- County: Delfan
- District: Khaveh
- Rural District: Khaveh-ye Jonubi

Population (2016)
  - Total: 197
- Time zone: UTC+3:30 (IRST)

Aliabad-e Gavkosh (Persian: علي اباد گاوكش) (Note: Also romanized as ‘Alīābād-e Gāvkosh) is a village in Khaveh-ye Jonubi Rural District of Khaveh District in Delfan County, Lorestan province, Iran.

== Demographics ==
=== Population ===
At the time of the 2006 National Census, the village's population was 191 in 33 households, when it was in the Central District. The following census in 2011 counted 189 people in 35 households. The 2016 census measured the population of the village as 197 people in 52 households, by which time the rural district had been separated from the district in the formation of Khaveh District.
