= Sarab Ghazanfar =

Village in Lorestan province, Iran

Sarab Ghazanfar Persian: سراب غضنفر
- Village
- Location within Iran
- Coordinates: 34°06′57″N 48°02′35″E
- Country: Iran
- Province: Lorestan
- County: Delfan
- District: Khaveh
- Rural District: Khaveh-ye Shomali

Population (2016)
  - Total: 1,642
- Time zone: UTC+3:30 (IRST)

Sarab Ghazanfar (Persian: سراب غضنفر) (Note: Also romanized as Sarāb Ghazanfar, Sarāb Ghaẕanfar, and Sarāb-e Ghazanfar) is a village in Khaveh-ye Shomali Rural District of Khaveh District in Delfan County, Lorestan province, Iran.

== Demographics ==
=== Population ===
At the time of the 2006 National Census, the village's population was 1,871 in 424 households, when it was in the Central District. The following census in 2011 counted 1,866 people in 510 households. The 2016 census measured the population of the village as 1,642 people in 485 households, by which time the rural district had been separated from the district in the formation of Khaveh District. Sarab Ghazanfar was the most populous village in its rural district.
