= Deh Now-e Karam Ali =

Village in Lorestan province, Iran

Deh Now-e Karam Ali Persian: دهنوكرمعلي
- Village
- Location within Iran
- Coordinates: 34°05′21″N 48°04′59″E
- Country: Iran
- Province: Lorestan
- County: Delfan
- District: Khaveh
- Rural District: Khaveh-ye Shomali

Population (2016)
  - Total: 18
- Time zone: UTC+3:30 (IRST)

Deh Now-e Karam Ali (Persian: دهنوكرمعلي) (Note: Also romanized as Deh Now-e Karam ‘Alī; also known as Deh Now Alashtar and Dehnow) is a village in Khaveh-ye Shomali Rural District of Khaveh District in Delfan County, Lorestan province, Iran.

== Demographics ==
=== Population ===
At the time of the 2006 National Census, the village's population was 48 in nine households, when it was in the Central District. The following census in 2011 counted 24 people in eight households. The 2016 census measured the population of the village as 18 people in six households, by which time the rural district had been separated from the district in the formation of Khaveh District.
