= Gav Bazeh, Lorestan =

Village in Lorestan province, Iran

Gav Bazeh Persian: گاوبازه
- Village
- Location within Iran
- Coordinates: 34°06′30″N 48°05′26″E
- Country: Iran
- Province: Lorestan
- County: Delfan
- District: Khaveh
- Rural District: Khaveh-ye Shomali

Population (2016)
  - Total: 327
- Time zone: UTC+3:30 (IRST)

Gav Bazeh (Persian: گاوبازه) (Note: Also romanized as Gāv Bāzeh; also known as Gav Pazeh) is a village in Khaveh-ye Shomali Rural District of Khaveh District in Delfan County, Lorestan province, Iran.

== Demographics ==
=== Population ===
At the time of the 2006 National Census, the village's population was 475 in 115 households, when it was in the Central District. The following census in 2011 counted 388 people in 103 households. The 2016 census measured the population of the village as 327 people in 94 households, by which time the rural district had been separated from the district in the formation of Khaveh District.
