= Nur Mohammadi Zamaneh =

Village in Lorestan province, Iran

Nur Mohammadi Zamaneh Persian: نورمحمدي زمانه
- Village
- Location within Iran
- Coordinates: 34°04′41″N 48°05′13″E
- Country: Iran
- Province: Lorestan
- County: Delfan
- District: Khaveh
- Rural District: Khaveh-ye Shomali

Population (2016)
  - Total: 127
- Time zone: UTC+3:30 (IRST)

Nur Mohammadi Zamaneh (Persian: نورمحمدي زمانه) (Note: Also romanized as Nūr Moḩammadī Zamāneh; also known as Nūr Moḩammadī) is a village in Khaveh-ye Shomali Rural District of Khaveh District in Delfan County, Lorestan province, Iran.

== Demographics ==
=== Population ===
At the time of the 2006 National Census, the village's population was 225 in 45 households, when it was in the Central District. The following census in 2011 counted 194 people in 46 households. The 2016 census measured the population of the village as 127 people in 32 households, by which time the rural district had been separated from the district in the formation of Khaveh District.
