= Hoseyn Talayi =

Village in Lorestan province, Iran

Hoseyn Talayi Persian: حسين طلايي
- Village
- Location within Iran
- Coordinates: 34°06′38″N 48°04′42″E
- Country: Iran
- Province: Lorestan
- County: Delfan
- District: Khaveh
- Rural District: Khaveh-ye Shomali

Population (2016)
  - Total: 157
- Time zone: UTC+3:30 (IRST)

Hoseyn Talayi (Persian: حسين طلايي) (Note: Also romanized as Ḩoseyn Ţalāyī; also known as Hosein Tala’i, Ḩoseyn Ţālā’ī, and Ḩoseyn Ţala’ī) is a village in Khaveh-ye Shomali Rural District of Khaveh District in Delfan County, Lorestan province, Iran.

== Demographics ==
=== Population ===
At the time of the 2006 National Census, the village's population was 168 in 37 households, when it was in the Central District. The following census in 2011 counted 167 people in 39 households. The 2016 census measured the population of the village as 157 people in 38 households, by which time the rural district had been separated from the district in the formation of Khaveh District.
