= Gandom Ban Habib Vand =

Village in Lorestan province, Iran

Gandom Ban Habib Vand Persian: گندم بان حبيب وند
- Village
- Location within Iran
- Coordinates: 34°03′28″N 48°07′21″E
- Country: Iran
- Province: Lorestan
- County: Delfan
- District: Khaveh
- Rural District: Khaveh-ye Jonubi

Population (2016)
  - Total: 251
- Time zone: UTC+3:30 (IRST)

Gandom Ban Habib Vand (Persian: گندم بان حبيب وند) (Note: Also romanized as Gandom Bān Ḩabīb Vand; also known as Gandom Bān, Gandoom Ban, Ḩabībvand, and Jībvand-e Gandom Bān) is a village in Khaveh-ye Jonubi Rural District of Khaveh District in Delfan County, Lorestan province, Iran.

== Demographics ==
=== Population ===
At the time of the 2006 National Census, the village's population was 302 in 69 households, when it was in the Central District. The following census in 2011 counted 275 people in 74 households. The 2016 census measured the population of the village as 251 people in 70 households, by which time the rural district had been separated from the district in the formation of Khaveh District.
