= Mohammad Mirzai =

Village in Lorestan province, Iran

Mohammad Mirzai Persian: محمدميرزايي
- Village
- Location within Iran
- Coordinates: 34°03′45″N 48°08′22″E
- Country: Iran
- Province: Lorestan
- County: Delfan
- District: Khaveh
- Rural District: Khaveh-ye Jonubi

Population (2016)
  - Total: 573
- Time zone: UTC+3:30 (IRST)

Mohammad Mirzai (Persian: محمدميرزايي) (Note: Also romanized as Moḩammad Mīrzā’ī) is a village in Khaveh-ye Jonubi Rural District of Khaveh District in Delfan County, Lorestan province, Iran.

== Demographics ==
=== Population ===
At the time of the 2006 National Census, the village's population was 586 in 111 households, when it was in the Central District. The following census in 2011 counted 619 people in 151 households. The 2016 census measured the population of the village as 573 people in 151 households, by which time the rural district had been separated from the district in the formation of Khaveh District.
