= Rock On 2 (soundtrack) =

2016 soundtrack album

Soundtrack album by Shankar–Ehsaan–Loy
- Released: 23 September 2016
- Recorded: 2015–2016
- Studios: YRF Studios, Mumbai; Enzy Studios, Mumbai
- Genre: Feature film soundtrack
- Length: 34:44
- Language: Hindi
- Label: Zee Music Company

Shankar–Ehsaan–Loy chronology
Mirzya (2016)	Rock On 2 (2016)	Raazi (2018)

Rock On 2 is the soundtrack album to the 2016 musical drama film of the same name directed by Shujaat Saudagar and produced by Farhan Akhtar and Ritesh Sidhwani under Excel Entertainment. It is the sequel to Rock On!! (2008) with Akhtar, Arjun Rampal, Purab Kohli and Prachi Desai reprising their roles and Shraddha Kapoor and Shashank Arora in new characters. The musician trio Shankar–Ehsaan–Loy and lyricist Javed Akhtar also return from the sequel, composing eight songs for the film. The album also featured contributions from the Shillong-based Summersalt band.

The success of the first film's soundtrack increased the expectations for the music of Rock On 2, with the composer trio and lyricist's reunion. Distributed under the Zee Music Company label on 23 September 2016, the album had a mixed response from music critics, who praised the compositions and Kapoor's vocals, but criticized Akhtar's vocals. It also received an underwhelming commercial response due to the lack of chartbuster tunes, and focusing more on narrative-driven numbers.

== Development ==
Like the first film, the music was integral to the film's story. The trio composed the tunes side by side, when Pubali Chaudhari wrote the script. They refrained from composing chartbuster numbers as they wanted it to drive the film's story and also refrained from reusing the songs from the first film. The title track "Rock On!!" was retained as it was the theme song of the film. Since the film is set in the Northeastern part of India, the team used local tunes and instrumentation to bring the essence of that region. Kit Shangpliang and Pynsuklin Syiemiong from the Shillong-based band Summersalt had contributed to the song "Hoi Kiw".

Akhtar and Kapoor sang most of the songs. Initially, the team had also planned for casting professional singers, before Kapoor's involvement. Despite her playback singing stint in her previous ventures, she gave a singing audition to the composer trio, as she had to perform rock songs. On composing "Udja Re", Mahadevan stated "We thought what would a DJ do with my vocals as a loop. So I sang something in the folk musician space, and we cut it and filtered it and we just had fun all the way."

== Marketing and release ==
The music of the sequel received high commercial expectations, as the predecessor's soundtrack was a success. It was launched at a live concert performance by the film's fictional band Magik, featuring the cast and the music team, at the Sardar Vallabhbhai Patel Indoor Stadium in Mumbai on 23 September 2016. Afterwards, "Rock On Revisited", a promotional music video featuring Akhtar and Kapoor, performing the title track from the first film, was released on 21 October.

== Concert tours ==
Initially, the team planned a three-day concert tour at the United States during 14–16 October where the band Magik was set to perform at Houston, New Jersey and California. Sun National Bank Center arena in New Jersey and Oracle Arena in Oakland, California, were booked as the venues for the first two days. However, the tour was cancelled by the producers, as they thought that the film franchise "is not seen as a conventional Hindi masala flick and there are few takers for the kind of the Indian rock music it has to offer". Wizcraft, the event organisers, also opined on the producers' call to cancel the event.

The team instead planned for a nationwide concert tour in Bangalore, Aurangabad, Hyderabad and New Delhi on 2, 6 and 8 November. The Delhi event was initially set to be held at the Kirori Mal College, where Kapoor's father Shakti Kapoor was the alma mater, but the staff council denied permissions as they could allow concerts only during a specific school festival and not any other event. This led to the team, shifting to the University of Delhi's Ramjas College for the concert tour.

== Reception ==
Rinky Kumar of The Times of India summarized "the album of Rock On 2 leaves much to be desired and is not a patch on the soundtrack of the prequel" rating three out of five stars. Devesh Sharma of Filmfare wrote "A nice hummable album that stays away from the usual Bollywood beat". Karthik Srinivasan of Milliblog stated "Despite Farhan'ish vocal shortcomings, the trio keeps Rock On 2 rocking."

Writing for India Today, Devarsi Ghosh complimented Kapoor's singing as "one can easily conclude that even without auto-tune or studio programming, [Kapoor] can easily hold her own with the mic". But was critical of Akhtar's vocals in the album, unlike in the first film where the "simple compositions and easy going lyrics going for them in addition to Farhan's unique vocal texture, became runaway hits" and the sequel's songs with Akhtar "sounds like B-sides to the first film's album". Michael Mukherjee of Scroll.in was also critical of Akhtar's singing stint, adding "Shankar-Ehsan-Loy's score would have been better served by a more accomplished singer."

In contrast, Rohit Mehrotra of The Quint wrote "there is nothing memorable in the album and it just plods along with ordinary lyrics and the underwhelming singing by Farhan destroying some really interesting tunes on the way." Swetha Ramakrishnan of Firstpost wrote "One song here and there is fine, but the Rock on 2 album is majorly split between two voices: Shraddha Kapoor and Farhan Akhtar, and the latter fails very badly at evoking any emotion." Sankhayan Ghosh of Mint stated "Rock On 2's use of rock music is fairly cosmetic and afraid to do anything new—a little problematic for a film that has the devil's horn instead of the '2' in its title."

Despite high expectations, the soundtrack was met with commercially underwhelming response which was attributed to the mixed critical response, the popularity of the Ae Dil Hai Mushkil soundtrack and the lack of chartbuster numbers, unlike the predecessor, where the songs being narrative driven. Saudagar and the actors, attributed that the soundtrack would attain popularity post-release, it did not do so after the box-office disaster.

== Track listing ==
All lyrics are written by Javed Akhtar, except where noted.

No.	Title	Performer(s)	Length
1.	"Jaago"	Farhan Akhtar, Siddharth Mahadevan	5:38
2.	"Udja Re"	Shraddha Kapoor	5:08
3.	"You Know What I Mean"	Farhan Akhtar	3:14
4.	"Manzar Naya"	Farhan Akhtar	3:29
5.	"Tere Mere Dil"	Shraddha Kapoor	4:02
6.	"Woh Jahaan"	Farhan Akhtar, Shraddha Kapoor	5:31
7.	"Hoi Kiw/Chalo Chalo" (additional lyrics: Kit Shangpliang)	Usha Uthup, Kit Shangpliang, Pynsuklin Syiemiong	4:03
8.	"Ishq Mastana"	Shankar Mahadevan, Digvijay Singh Pariyar	3:36
Total length:			34:44
