= Mohammadjan-e Falak ol Din =

Village in Lorestan province, Iran

Mohammadjan-e Falak ol Din Persian: محمدجان فلك الدين
- Village
- Location within Iran
- Coordinates: 34°02′20″N 48°08′54″E
- Country: Iran
- Province: Lorestan
- County: Delfan
- District: Khaveh
- Rural District: Khaveh-ye Jonubi

Population (2016)
  - Total: 207
- Time zone: UTC+3:30 (IRST)

Mohammadjan-e Falak ol Din (Persian: محمدجان فلك الدين) (Note: Also romanized as Moḩammadjān-e Falak ol Dīn; also known as Moḩammadjān and Moḩammadjān-e Falak od Dīn) is a village in Khaveh-ye Jonubi Rural District of Khaveh District in Delfan County, Lorestan province, Iran.

== Demographics ==
=== Population ===
At the time of the 2006 National Census, the village's population was 194 in 50 households, when it was in the Central District. The following census in 2011 counted 198 people in 59 households. The 2016 census measured the population of the village as 207 people in 61 households, by which time the rural district had been separated from the district in the formation of Khaveh District.
