= Salianeh =

Salianeh (Persian: ساليانه) may refer to:

- Salianeh, Delfan, in Iran
- Salianeh, Selseleh, in Iran
