= Kafraj, Lorestan =

Village in Lorestan province, Iran

Kafraj Persian: كفراج
- Village
- Location within Iran
- Coordinates: 34°05′57″N 48°03′54″E
- Country: Iran
- Province: Lorestan
- County: Delfan
- District: Khaveh
- Rural District: Khaveh-ye Shomali

Population (2016)
  - Total: 1,532
- Time zone: UTC+3:30 (IRST)

Kafraj (Persian: كفراج) (Note: Also romanized as Kafrāj) is a village in, and the capital of, Khaveh-ye Shomali Rural District in Khaveh District of Delfan County, Lorestan province, Iran.

== Demographics ==
=== Population ===
At the time of the 2006 National Census, the village's population was 1,367 in 308 households, when it was in the Central District. The following census in 2011 counted 1,586 people in 411 households. The 2016 census measured the population of the village as 1,532 people in 458 households, by which time the rural district had been separated from the district in the formation of Khaveh District.
