= Cheragh =

Village in Lorestan province, Iran

Cheragh Persian: چراغ
- Village
- Location within Iran
- Coordinates: 34°01′51″N 48°09′10″E
- Country: Iran
- Province: Lorestan
- County: Delfan
- District: Khaveh
- Rural District: Khaveh-ye Jonubi

Population (2016)
  - Total: 680
- Time zone: UTC+3:30 (IRST)

Cheragh (Persian: چراغ) (Note: Also romanized as Cherāgh; also known as ‘Alīābād-e Cherāgh) is a village in Khaveh-ye Jonubi Rural District of Khaveh District in Delfan County, Lorestan province, Iran.

== Demographics ==
=== Population ===
At the time of the 2006 National Census, the village's population was 734 in 181 households, when it was in the Central District. The following census in 2011 counted 812 people in 226 households. The 2016 census measured the population of the village as 680 people in 211 households, by which time the rural district had been separated from the district in the formation of Khaveh District.
