= Jafarbagi =

Jafarbagi (Persian: جافربيگي) may refer to:

- Jafarbagi-ye Olya
- Jafarbagi-ye Sofla
