= Abd ol Hoseyni =

Village in Lorestan province, Iran

Abd ol Hoseyni Persian: عبدالحسيني
- Village
- Location within Iran
- Coordinates: 34°03′09″N 48°07′52″E
- Country: Iran
- Province: Lorestan
- County: Delfan
- District: Khaveh
- Rural District: Khaveh-ye Jonubi

Population (2016)
  - Total: 467
- Time zone: UTC+3:30 (IRST)

Abd ol Hoseyni (Persian: عبدالحسيني) (Note: Also romanized as ‘Abd ol Ḩoseynī; also known as‘Abd Ḩoseynī and ‘Abd ol Ḩoseyn) is a village in Khaveh-ye Jonubi Rural District of Khaveh District in Delfan County, Lorestan province, Iran.

== Demographics ==
=== Population ===
At the time of the 2006 National Census, the village's population was 476 in 99 households, when it was in the Central District. The following census in 2011 counted 414 people in 114 households. The 2016 census measured the population of the village as 467 people in 131 households, by which time the rural district had been separated from the district in the formation of Khaveh District.
