= Iranshah =

Iranshah may refer to:

- Iranshah Atash Behram, a Zoroastrian fire temple in Udvada, India
- Iranshah, Lorestan, a village in Iran
- Iranshah, alternate name of Iran Shahi, Iran
- Irānshāh (poet) or Iranshan, Persian poet during the Seljuq dynasty of Malik-Shah I
- Iranshah ibn Turanshah, sixth emir of Kerman

== See also ==
- Iranshahr (disambiguation)
