= Sorkhanjub =

Sorkhanjub (Persian: سرخانجوب) may refer to various villages in Iran:

- Sorkhanjub-e Olya
- Sorkhanjub-e Sofla
