= Sheykhabad, Delfan =

Village in Lorestan province, Iran

Sheykhabad Persian: شيخ اباد
- Village
- Location within Iran
- Coordinates: 34°02′14″N 48°11′50″E
- Country: Iran
- Province: Lorestan
- County: Delfan
- District: Khaveh
- Rural District: Khaveh-ye Jonubi

Population (2016)
  - Total: 156
- Time zone: UTC+3:30 (IRST)

Sheykhabad (Persian: شيخ اباد) (Note: Also romanized as Sheykhābād) is a village in Khaveh-ye Jonubi Rural District of Khaveh District in Delfan County, Lorestan province, Iran.

== Demographics ==
=== Population ===
At the time of the 2006 National Census, the village's population was 136 in 35 households, when it was in the Central District. The following census in 2011 counted 136 people in 33 households. The 2016 census measured the population of the village as 156 people in 43 households, by which time the rural district had been separated from the district in the formation of Khaveh District.
