= Gavkosh =

Gavkosh (Persian: گاوكش) may refer to:

- Gavkosh, Hormozgan
- Gavkosh, Kerman
- Gavkosh, Jiroft, Kerman Province
- Gavkosh, Razavi Khorasan

== See also ==
- Gav Kosh (disambiguation)
