= Qalandar, Delfan =

Village in Lorestan province, Iran

Qalandar Persian: قلندر
- Village
- Location within Iran
- Coordinates: 34°02′34″N 48°10′19″E
- Country: Iran
- Province: Lorestan
- County: Delfan
- District: Khaveh
- Rural District: Khaveh-ye Jonubi

Population (2016)
  - Total: 642
- Time zone: UTC+3:30 (IRST)

Qalandar (Persian: قلندر) (Note: Also known as Ghalandar) is a village in Khaveh-ye Jonubi Rural District of Khaveh District in Delfan County, Lorestan province, Iran.

== Demographics ==
=== Population ===
At the time of the 2006 National Census, the village's population was 638 in 147 households, when it was in the Central District. The following census in 2011 counted 650 people in 167 households. The 2016 census measured the population of the village as 642 people in 180 households, by which time the rural district had been separated from the district in the formation of Khaveh District.
