= Yadegar, Lorestan =

Village in Lorestan province, Iran

Yadegar Persian: يادگار
- Village
- Location within Iran
- Coordinates: 34°01′53″N 48°10′41″E
- Country: Iran
- Province: Lorestan
- County: Delfan
- District: Khaveh
- Rural District: Khaveh-ye Jonubi

Population (2016)
  - Total: 173
- Time zone: UTC+3:30 (IRST)

Yadegar (Persian: يادگار) (Note: Also romanized as Yādegār) is a village in Khaveh-ye Jonubi Rural District of Khaveh District in Delfan County, Lorestan province, Iran.

== Demographics ==
=== Population ===
At the time of the 2006 National Census, the village's population was 144 in 35 households, when it was in the Central District. The following census in 2011 counted 155 people in 42 households. The 2016 census measured the population of the village as 173 people in 49 households, by which time the rural district had been separated from the district in the formation of Khaveh District.
