= Zolivar =

Village in Lorestan province, Iran

Zolivar Persian: زليوار
- Village
- Location within Iran
- Country: Iran
- Province: Lorestan
- County: Delfan
- District: Khaveh
- Rural District: Khaveh-ye Shomali

Population (2016)
  - Total: 497
- Time zone: UTC+3:30 (IRST)

Zolivar (Persian: زليوار) (Note: Also romanized as Z̄olīvār; also known as Zoleyvā and Zolīvā) is a village in Khaveh-ye Shomali Rural District of Khaveh District in Delfan County, Lorestan province, Iran.

== Demographics ==
=== Population ===
At the time of the 2006 National Census, the village's population was 518 in 114 households, when it was in the Central District. The following census in 2011 counted 590 people in 145 households. The 2016 census measured the population of the village as 497 people in 141 households, by which time the rural district had been separated from the district in the formation of Khaveh District.
