= Heydarabad, Khaveh =

Village in Lorestan province, Iran

Heydarabad Persian: حيدراباد
- Village
- Location within Iran
- Country: Iran
- Province: Lorestan
- County: Delfan
- District: Khaveh
- Rural District: Khaveh-ye Jonubi

Population (2016)
  - Total: 34
- Time zone: UTC+3:30 (IRST)

Heydarabad (Persian: حيدراباد) (Note: Also romanized as Ḩeydarābād) is a village in Khaveh-ye Jonubi Rural District of Khaveh District in Delfan County, Lorestan province, Iran.

== Demographics ==
=== Population ===
At the time of the 2006 National Census, the village's population was 34 in eight households, when it was in the Central District. The following census in 2011 counted 36 people in 11 households. The 2016 census measured the population of the village as 34 people in 11 households, by which time the rural district had been separated from the district in the formation of Khaveh District.
