= Aliabad, Khaveh-ye Jonubi =

Village in Lorestan province, Iran

Aliabad Persian: علي آباد
- Village
- Location within Iran
- Country: Iran
- Province: Lorestan
- County: Delfan
- District: Khaveh
- Rural District: Khaveh-ye Jonubi

Population (2016)
  - Total: 117
- Time zone: UTC+3:30 (IRST)

Aliabad (Persian: علي آباد) (Note: Also romanized as ‘Alīābād; also known as Shāh ‘Alī) is a village in Khaveh-ye Jonubi Rural District of Khaveh District in Delfan County, Lorestan province, Iran.

== Demographics ==
=== Population ===
At the time of the 2006 National Census, the village's population was 102 in 23 households, when it was in the Central District. The following census in 2011 counted 121 people in 33 households. The 2016 census measured the population of the village as 117 people in 34 households, by which time the rural district had been separated from the district in the formation of Khaveh District.
