= Shah Ali =

Shah Ali (Persian: شاه علی) may refer to:

- Aliabad (34°02′ N 48°10′ E), Khaveh-ye Jonubi, a village in Khaveh-ye Jonubi Rural District, in the Central District of Delfan County, Lorestan Province, Iran
- Gardangah-e Shahali, a village in Miyankuh-e Gharbi Rural District, in the Central District of Pol-e Dokhtar County, Lorestan Province, Iran
- Shahghali (1505–1567), khan of the Qasim Khanate and the Khanate of Kazan
