= Gav Kosh-e Olya =

Village in Lorestan province, Iran

Gav Kosh-e Olya Persian: گاوكش عليا
- Village
- Location within Iran
- Coordinates: 33°59′41″N 48°05′16″E
- Country: Iran
- Province: Lorestan
- County: Delfan
- District: Khaveh
- Rural District: Khaveh-ye Jonubi

Population (2016)
  - Total: 1,775
- Time zone: UTC+3:30 (IRST)

Gav Kosh-e Olya (Persian: گاوكش عليا) (Note: Also romanized as Gāv Kosh-e ‘Olyā; also known as Gāu Kush and Gāv Kosh) is a village in Khaveh-ye Jonubi Rural District of Khaveh District in Delfan County, Lorestan province, Iran.

== Demographics ==
=== Population ===
At the time of the 2006 National Census, the village's population was 1,836 in 407 households, when it was in the Central District. The following census in 2011 counted 1,806 people in 441 households. The 2016 census measured the population of the village as 1,775 people in 488 households, by which time the rural district had been separated from the district in the formation of Khaveh District.
