= Eslamabad-e Gamasiyab-e Pain =

Village in Lorestan province, Iran

Eslamabad-e Gamasiyab-e Pain Persian: اسلام آباد گاماسياب پايين
- Village
- Location within Iran
- Coordinates: 34°02′00″N 48°14′18″E
- Country: Iran
- Province: Lorestan
- County: Delfan
- District: Khaveh
- Rural District: Khaveh-ye Jonubi

Population (2016)
  - Total: 128
- Time zone: UTC+3:30 (IRST)

Eslamabad-e Gamasiyab-e Pain (Persian: اسلام آباد گاماسياب پايين) (Note: Also romanized as Eslāmābād-e Gāmāsīyāb-e Pā’īn; formerly known as Eslamabad Gamasyab Sofla (اسلام آباد گاماسياب سفلي), also romanized as Eslāmābād Gāmāsyāb Soflá; also known as Eslāmābād-e Soflá) is a village in Khaveh-ye Jonubi Rural District of Khaveh District in Delfan County, Lorestan province, Iran.

== Demographics ==
=== Population ===
At the time of the 2006 National Census, the village's population, as Eslamabad Gamasyab Sofla, was 94 in 21 households, when it was in the Central District. The following census in 2011 counted 108 people in 33 households, by which time the village was listed as Eslamabad-e Gamasiyab-e Pain. The 2016 census measured the population of the village as 128 people in 40 households, when the rural district had been separated from the district in the formation of Khaveh District.
