= Soorma (soundtrack) =

Soundtrack album by Shankar–Ehsaan–Loy
- Released: 11 June 2018
- Recorded: 2015–2018
- Genre: Feature film soundtrack
- Length: 23:27
- Languages: Hindi; Punjabi
- Label: Sony Music India
- Producer: Shankar–Ehsaan–Loy

Shankar–Ehsaan–Loy chronology
Raazi (2018)	Soorma (2018)	Manikarnika: The Queen of Jhansi (2019)

Soorma is the soundtrack to the 2018 film of the same name directed by Shaad Ali and produced by Sony Pictures Networks Productions and C. S. Films, starring Diljit Dosanjh and Taapsee Pannu. The film's musical score is composed by Shankar–Ehsaan–Loy with lyrics written by Gulzar and was released under the Sony Music India label on 11 June 2018 to positive critical response.

== Development ==
Shankar–Ehsaan–Loy composed the score and soundtrack in his fourth collaboration with Ali after Bunty Aur Babli (2005), Jhoom Barabar Jhoom (2007) and Kill Dil (2014). He started working on the soundtrack during late-2017, simultaneously composing for Raazi with the tunes curated at Gulzar's farmhouse in Mumbai. In February 2018, Dosanjh had recorded the song "Ishq Di Baajiyaan" which was his second song in Hindi, after crooning vocals for "Ikk Kudi" in Udta Punjab (2016). Hemant Brijwasi and Akhtar brothers (Shehnaz and Sahil), contestants from the second season of the Indian talent hunt show Rising Star were offered by Dosanjh and Shankar Mahadevan to provide vocals for few songs. They recorded two songs for the film: "Pardesiya" and "Flicker Singh".

== Release ==
The soundtrack was released under the Sony Music India on 11 June 2018, the same day as the film's trailer was launched. In 2022, a deluxe edition of the album was released featuring remix, reprise and lofi version of "Ishq Di Baajiyaan".

== Reception ==
Vipin Nair of The Hindu wrote "Soorma’s five song soundtrack is a rousing listen appropriate to its subject". Karthik Srinivasan of Milliblog noted that "the trio is on a spree" with the soundtracks of Raazi and Soorma. Devarsi Ghosh of Scroll.in wrote "Soorma’s 23-minute soundtrack, too short an affair for a Shankar-Ehsaan-Loy-and-Gulzar collaboration, has a song for all of these situations." Devansh Sharma of Firstpost summarized that "The album boasts of a fair share of sprightly songs but they are wisely balanced by a liberal dose of romantic tracks, upgraded by Gulzar’s trademark symbolic lyrics [...] the Punjabi-dominated lyrics of Soorma risk not being universal, but Shankar-Ehsaan-Loy’s mix of music elements saves the day." Debarati S Sen of The Times of India wrote "In a world of remixes and OTT EDM, this is one album you should not miss." In contrast, Suanshu Khurana of The Indian Express rated 2.5/5 saying, "Soorma, although interesting and energetic in parts, just isn’t edgy enough."

== Track listing ==
Standard edition
No.	Title	Singer(s)	Length
1.	"Ishq Di Baajiyaan"	Diljit Dosanjh	4:47
2.	"Soorma Anthem"	Shankar Mahadevan	4:12
3.	"Good Man Di Laaltain"	Sukhwinder Singh, Sunidhi Chauhan	3:25
4.	"Pardesiya"	Shehnaz Akhtar, Hemant Brijwasi, Sahil Akhtar	4:57
5.	"Flicker Singh"	Shehnaz Akhtar, Hemant Brijwasi, Sahil Akhtar	6:06
Total length:			23:27

Deluxe edition
No.	Title	Singer(s)	Length
6.	"Ishq Di Baajiyaan" (Lofi Flip)	Diljit Dosanjh	3:47
7.	"Ishq Di Baajiyaan" (Reprise)	Shashaa Tirupati	3:47
8.	"Ishq Di Baajiyaan" (Remix)	Diljit Dosanjh, DJ NYK	3:33
Total length:			34:37
