= Cheshmeh Khani-ye Olya =

Village in Lorestan province, Iran

Cheshmeh Khani-ye Olya Persian: چشمه خاني عليا
- Village
- Location within Iran
- Coordinates: 34°02′00″N 48°12′14″E
- Country: Iran
- Province: Lorestan
- County: Delfan
- District: Khaveh
- Rural District: Khaveh-ye Jonubi

Population (2016)
  - Total: 156
- Time zone: UTC+3:30 (IRST)

Cheshmeh Khani-ye Olya (Persian: چشمه خاني عليا) (Note: Also romanized as Cheshmeh Khānī-ye 'Olyā) is a village in Khaveh-ye Jonubi Rural District of Khaveh District in Delfan County, Lorestan province, Iran.

== Demographics ==
=== Population ===
At the time of the 2006 National Census, the village's population was 120 in 28 households, when it was in the Central District. The following census in 2011 counted 202 people in 57 households. The 2016 census measured the population of the village as 156 people in 42 households, by which time the rural district had been separated from the district in the formation of Khaveh District.
