= Eslamabad-e Gamasiyab-e Bala =

Village in Lorestan province, Iran

Eslamabad-e Gamasiyab-e Bala Persian: اسلام آباد گاماسياب بالا
- Village
- Location within Iran
- Coordinates: 34°02′11″N 48°15′36″E
- Country: Iran
- Province: Lorestan
- County: Delfan
- District: Khaveh
- Rural District: Khaveh-ye Jonubi

Population (2016)
  - Total: 183
- Time zone: UTC+3:30 (IRST)

Eslamabad-e Gamasiyab-Bala (Persian: اسلام آباد گاماسياب بالا) (Note: Also romanized as Eslāmābād-e Gāmāsiyāb-e Bālā; formerly known as Eslamabad Gamasyab Olya (اسلام آباد گاماسياب عليا), also romanized as Eslāmābād Gāmāsyāb ʿOlyā; also known as Eslāmābād-e ‘Olyā) is a village in Khaveh-ye Jonubi Rural District of Khaveh District in Delfan County, Lorestan province, Iran.

== Demographics ==
=== Population ===
At the time of the 2006 National Census, the village's population, as Eslamabad Gamasyab Olya, was 159 in 34 households, when it was in the Central District. The following census in 2011 counted 172 people in 48 households, by which time the village was listed as Eslamabad-e Gamasiyab-e Bala. The 2016 census measured the population of the village as 183 people in 57 households, when the rural district had been separated from the district in the formation of Khaveh District.
