= Salianeh, Delfan =

Village in Lorestan province, Iran

Salianeh Persian: ساليانه
- Village
- Location within Iran
- Coordinates: 34°03′51″N 48°04′49″E
- Country: Iran
- Province: Lorestan
- County: Delfan
- District: Khaveh
- Rural District: Khaveh-ye Shomali

Population (2016)
  - Total: 23
- Time zone: UTC+3:30 (IRST)

Salianeh (Persian: ساليانه) (Note: Also romanized as Sāleyāneh and Sālīāneh) is a village in Khaveh-ye Shomali Rural District of Khaveh District in Delfan County, Lorestan province, Iran.

== Demographics ==
=== Population ===
At the time of the 2006 National Census, the village's population was 46 in 10 households, when it was in the Central District. The following census in 2011 counted 39 people in 13 households. The 2016 census measured the population of the village as 23 people in seven households, by which time the rural district had been separated from the district in the formation of Khaveh District.
