= Bagverdi-ye Pain =

Village in Lorestan province, Iran

Bagverdi-ye Pain Persian: بگ وردي پايين
- Village
- Location within Iran
- Coordinates: 34°02′50″N 48°10′11″E
- Country: Iran
- Province: Lorestan
- County: Delfan
- District: Khaveh
- Rural District: Khaveh-ye Jonubi

Population (2016)
  - Total: 345
- Time zone: UTC+3:30 (IRST)

Bagverdi-ye Pain (Persian: بگ وردي پايين) (Note: Also romanized as Bagverdī-ye Pā’īn; formerly known as Bagverdi-ye Sofla (بگوردي سفلي), also romanized as Bagverdī-ye Soflá) is a village in Khaveh-ye Jonubi Rural District of Khaveh District in Delfan County, Lorestan province, Iran.

== Demographics ==
=== Population ===
At the time of the 2006 National Census, the village's population, as Bagverdi-ye Sofla, was 303 in 62 households, when it was in the Central District. The following census in 2011 counted 303 people in 102 households, by which time the village was listed as Bagverdi-ye Pain. The 2016 census measured the population of the village as 345 people in 98 households, when the rural district had been separated from the district in the formation of Khaveh District.
