= Sorkhanjub-e Olya =

Village in Lorestan province, Iran

Sorkhanjub-e Olya Persian: سرخانجوب عليا
- Village
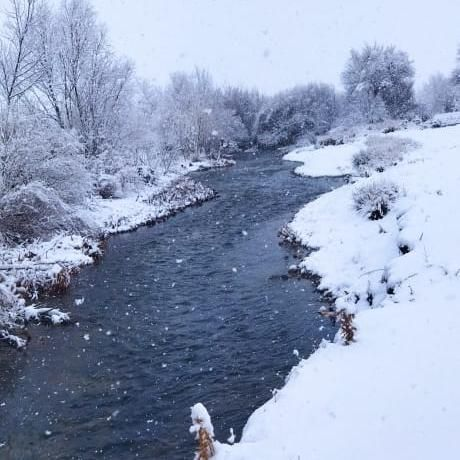
- Winter landscape in the village of Sorkhanjub-e Olya

- Location within Iran
- Country: Iran
- Province: Lorestan
- County: Delfan
- District: Khaveh
- Rural District: Khaveh-ye Shomali

Population (2016)
  - Total: 595
- Time zone: UTC+3:30 (IRST)

Sorkhanjub-e Olya (Persian: سرخانجوب عليا) (Note: Also romanized as Sorkhānjūb-e ‘Olyā; also known as Sorkhān Jūb, Sorkhān Jūb-e Bālā, Sorkhānjūb, and Sorkhūnjūy) is a village in Khaveh-ye Shomali Rural District of Khaveh District in Delfan County, Lorestan province, Iran.

== Demographics ==
=== Population ===
At the time of the 2006 National Census, the village's population was 675 in 139 households, when it was in the Central District. The following census in 2011 counted 766 people in 182 households. The 2016 census measured the population of the village as 595 people in 155 households, by which time the rural district had been separated from the district in the formation of Khaveh District.
