= Salal Gaon =

State of Assam, India

Salal Gaon is a village located in the Lakhimpur district in the northeastern Indian state of Assam. North Lakhimpur, Bihapuria, Dhakuakhona, Naoboicha, Narayanpur are the nearest towns to Salal Gaon.

== Demographics ==
According to the 2011 census, 262 families reside in Salal village. It has a population of 1243; 634 males and 609 females. Female population is .961 per thousand male, which is higher than average population of Assam (.958). Salal Gaon has an average literacy rate of 95.17%, higher than the state average of 72.19 %.
