= Bagverdi-ye Bala =

Village in Lorestan province, Iran

Bagverdi-ye Bala Persian: بگ وردي بالا
- Village
- Location within Iran
- Coordinates: 34°03′00″N 48°09′10″E
- Country: Iran
- Province: Lorestan
- County: Delfan
- District: Khaveh
- Rural District: Khaveh-ye Jonubi

Population (2016)
  - Total: 132
- Time zone: UTC+3:30 (IRST)

Bagverdi-ye Bala (Persian: بگ وردي بالا) (Note: Also romanized as Bagverdī-ye Bālā; formerly known as Bagverdi-ye Olya (بگوردي عليا), also romanized as Bagverdī-ye ‘Olyā) is a village in Khaveh-ye Jonubi Rural District of Khaveh District in Delfan County, Lorestan province, Iran.

== Demographics ==
=== Population ===
At the time of the 2006 National Census, the village's population, as Bagverdi-ye Olya, was 128 in 30 households, when it was in the Central District. The following census in 2011 counted 139 people in 33 households, by which time the village was listed as Bagverdi-ye Bala. The 2016 census measured the population of the village as 132 people in 36 households, when the rural district had been separated from the district in the formation of Khaveh District.
