= Gav Kosh-e Vosta =

Village in Lorestan province, Iran

Gav Kosh-e Vosta Persian: گاوكش وسطي
- Village
- Location within Iran
- Coordinates: 33°59′43″N 48°04′42″E
- Country: Iran
- Province: Lorestan
- County: Delfan
- District: Khaveh
- Rural District: Khaveh-ye Jonubi

Population (2016)
  - Total: 204
- Time zone: UTC+3:30 (IRST)

Gav Kosh-e Vosta (Persian: گاوكش وسطي) (Note: Also romanized as Gav Kosh-e Vasaţī, Gāv Kosh-e Vosţá, and Gāv Kosh-e Vosţā; also known as Golābād) is a village in Khaveh-ye Jonubi Rural District of Khaveh District in Delfan County, Lorestan province, Iran.

== Demographics ==
=== Population ===
At the time of the 2006 National Census, the village's population was 204 in 41 households, when it was in the Central District. The following census in 2011 counted 223 people in 52 households. The 2016 census measured the population of the village as 204 people in 55 households, by which time the rural district had been separated from the district in the formation of Khaveh District.
