= Bagverdi-ye Vosta =

Village in Lorestan province, Iran

Bagverdi-ye Vosta Persian: بگوردي وسطي
- Village
- Location within Iran
- Coordinates: 34°03′11″N 48°09′31″E
- Country: Iran
- Province: Lorestan
- County: Delfan
- District: Khaveh
- Rural District: Khaveh-ye Jonubi

Population (2016)
  - Total: 90
- Time zone: UTC+3:30 (IRST)

Bagverdi-ye Vosta (Persian: بگوردي وسطي) (Note: Also romanized as Bagverdī-ye Vostá) is a village in Khaveh-ye Jonubi Rural District of Khaveh District in Delfan County, Lorestan province, Iran.

== Demographics ==
=== Population ===
At the time of the 2006 National Census, the village's population was 103 in 23 households, when it was in the Central District. The following census in 2011 counted 149 people in 38 households. The 2016 census measured the population of the village as 90 people in 26 households, by which time the rural district had been separated from the district in the formation of Khaveh District.
