= Mirzai (disambiguation) =

Mirzai is a religious slur used to refer to Ahmadis.

Mirzai may also refer to:

- Mirzai (garment), a garment similar to a jacket
- Mirzayi, a dance
- Ali Mirzai (disambiguation), several topics with the name

== Others ==
- Mirzahit, a village in Bashkortostan, Russia
