= Mirzayev =

Mirzayev (and its variant Mirzaev) is a surname. Notable people with the surname include:

- Abdukarim Mirzayev (born 1982), Uzbek journalist and film director
- Arif Mirzayev (born 1944), Azerbaijani composer
- Bahatdin Mirzayev (1914–1987), Azerbaijani Red Army captain
- Davron Mirzaev (born 1989), Uzbek football player
- Hikmat Mirzayev, Azerbaijani military officer
- Ilgar Mirzayev (1973–2020), Azerbaijani military officer
- Jeyhun Mirzayev (1946–1993), Azerbaijani actor and film director
- Kamal Mirzayev (born 1994), Azerbaijani football player
- Murad Mirzayev (1976–2016), Azerbaijani military officer
- Osman Mirzayev (1937–1991), Azerbaijani Soviet journalist and writer
- Ruslan Mirzayev (born 1989), Uzbek film producer and director
- Sardor Mirzaev (born 1991), Uzbek football player
- Shirin Mirzayev (1942–1992), Azerbaijani military officer
- Turan Mirzayev (born 1979), Azerbaijani weightlifter
- Yusif Mirzayev (1958–1993), Azerbaijani soldier

== See also ==
- Mirza (disambiguation)
