= Ali Mirzai =

Ali Mirzai (Persian: علي ميرزايي) may refer to:

- Ali Mirzai (football), Iranian football player
- Ali Mirzai-ye Olya, village in Iran, in the Khaveh-ye Jonubi Rural District
- Ali Mirzai-ye Sofla, village in Iran, in the Khaveh-ye Jonubi Rural District
- Ali Mirzaei (weightlifter), Iranian weightlifter
