= Gav Kosh-e Sofla =

Village in Lorestan province, Iran

Gav Kosh-e Sofla Persian: گاوكش سفلي
- Village
- Location within Iran
- Coordinates: 33°59′12″N 48°04′06″E
- Country: Iran
- Province: Lorestan
- County: Delfan
- District: Khaveh
- Rural District: Khaveh-ye Jonubi

Population (2016)
  - Total: 761
- Time zone: UTC+3:30 (IRST)

Gav Kosh-e Sofla (Persian: گاوكش سفلي) (Note: Also romanized as Gāv Kosh-e Soflá) is a village in Khaveh-ye Jonubi Rural District of Khaveh District in Delfan County, Lorestan province, Iran.

== Demographics ==
=== Population ===
At the time of the 2006 National Census, the village's population was 772 in 169 households, when it was in the Central District. The following census in 2011 counted 856 people in 211 households. The 2016 census measured the population of the village as 761 people in 212 households, by which time the rural district had been separated from the district in the formation of Khaveh District.
