= Jafarbeygi-ye Pain =

Village in Lorestan province, Iran

Jafarbeygi-ye Pain Persian: جافربيگي پايين
- Village
- Location within Iran
- Coordinates: 34°01′45″N 48°12′00″E
- Country: Iran
- Province: Lorestan
- County: Delfan
- District: Khaveh
- Rural District: Khaveh-ye Jonubi

Population (2016)
  - Total: 103
- Time zone: UTC+3:30 (IRST)

Jafarbeygi-ye Pain (Persian: جافربيگي پايين) (Note: Also romanized as Ja‘farbeygī-ye Pā’īn; formerly known as Jafarbeygi-ye Sofla (جافربيگي سفلي), also romanized as Ja‘farbeygī-ye Soflá; also known as Jafarbagi-ye Sofla and Ja‘farbagī-ye Soflá) is a village in Khaveh-ye Jonubi Rural District of Khaveh District in Delfan County, Lorestan province, Iran.

== Demographics ==
=== Population ===
At the time of the 2006 National Census, the village's population, as Jafarbeygi-ye Sofla, was 77 in 17 households, when it was in the Central District. The following census in 2011 counted 69 people in 18 households, by which time the village was listed as Jafarbeygi-ye Pain. The 2016 census measured the population of the village as 103 people in 31 households, when the rural district had been separated from the district in the formation of Khaveh District.
