= Cheshmeh Khani-ye Sofla =

Village in Lorestan province, Iran

Cheshmeh Khani-ye Sofla Persian: چشمه خاني سفلي
- Village
- Location within Iran
- Coordinates: 34°02′00″N 48°12′14″E
- Country: Iran
- Province: Lorestan
- County: Delfan
- District: Khaveh
- Rural District: Khaveh-ye Jonubi

Population (2016)
  - Total: 123
- Time zone: UTC+3:30 (IRST)

Cheshmeh Khani-ye Sofla (Persian: چشمه خاني سفلي) (Note: Also romanized as Cheshmeh Khānī-ye Soflá; also known as Chashmeh Khānī and Cheshmeh Khānī) is a village in Khaveh-ye Jonubi Rural District of Khaveh District in Delfan County, Lorestan province, Iran.

== Demographics ==
=== Population ===
At the time of the 2006 National Census, the village's population was 43 in 10 households, when it was in the Central District. The following census in 2011 counted 44 people in 14 households. The 2016 census measured the population of the village as 123 people in 40 households, by which time the rural district had been separated from the district in the formation of Khaveh District.
