= Sorkhanjub-e Sofla =

Village in Lorestan province, Iran

Sorkhanjub-e Sofla Persian: سرخانجوب سفلي
- Village
- Location within Iran
- Country: Iran
- Province: Lorestan
- County: Delfan
- District: Khaveh
- Rural District: Khaveh-ye Shomali

Population (2016)
  - Total: 24
- Time zone: UTC+3:30 (IRST)

Sorkhanjub-e Sofla (Persian: سرخانجوب سفلي) (Note: Also romanized as Sorkhānjūb-e Soflá; also known as Sarkhonjū) is a village in Khaveh-ye Shomali Rural District of Khaveh District in Delfan County, Lorestan province, Iran.

== Demographics ==
=== Population ===
At the time of the 2006 National Census, the village's population was 214 in 41 households, when it was in the Central District. The following census in 2011 counted 118 people in 25 households. The 2016 census measured the population of the village as 24 people in nine households, by which time the rural district had been separated from the district in the formation of Khaveh District.
