= Jafarbeygi-ye Bala =

Village in Lorestan province, Iran

Jafarbeygi-ye Bala Persian: جافربيگي بالا
- Village
- Location within Iran
- Coordinates: 34°01′38″N 48°12′25″E
- Country: Iran
- Province: Lorestan
- County: Delfan
- District: Khaveh
- Rural District: Khaveh-ye Jonubi

Population (2016)
  - Total: 75
- Time zone: UTC+3:30 (IRST)

Jafarbeygi-ye Bala (Persian: جافربيگي بالا) (Note: Also romanized as Ja‘farbeygī-ye Bālā; formerly known as Jafarbeygi-ye Olya (جافربيگي عليا), also romanized as Ja‘farbeygī-ye ‘Olyā; also known as Jafarbagi-ye Olya and Ja‘farbagī-ye ‘Olyā) is a village in Khaveh-ye Jonubi Rural District of Khaveh District in Delfan County, Lorestan province, Iran.

== Demographics ==
=== Population ===
At the time of the 2006 National Census, the village's population, as Jafarbeygi-ye Olya, was 68 in 20 households, when it was in the Central District. The following census in 2011 counted 68 people in 19 households, by which time the village was listed as Jafarbeygi-ye Bala. The 2016 census measured the population of the village as 75 people in 21 households, when the rural district had been separated from the district in the formation of Khaveh District.
