= Iranshahr =

Iranshahr may refer to:

- Ērānshahr or Īrānshahr, the Sasanian Empire
- Greater Iran or Iranshahr
- Iranshahr (city), a city in the Sistan and in Baluchestan Province, Iran
- Piranshahr (former name), a city in West Azerbaijan Province, Iran
- Iran Shahr or Iran Shah, a village in Kurdistan Province, Iran
- Iranshahr County, a county in the Sistan and in Baluchestan Province, Iran
- Iranshahr Atash Behram, the holiest Zoroastrian fire temple in India
- Fahraj, formerly Iranshahr, a city in Kerman Province, Iran
- Iran Shahi or Iranshahr, a village in Lorestan Province, Iran
- The Parthian province of Nishapur, which also included Sistan

== See also ==
- Iranshah (disambiguation)
- Iranshahr High School, a high school in Yazd, Iran
- Iran (word)
