= Ramgaon =

- Village
- Location in Assam Location in India
- Coordinates: 26.70°N 91.71°E
- Country: India
- State: Assam
- Region: Western Assam
- District: Kamrup

Government
  - Body: Gram panchayat
- Elevation: 42 m (138 ft)

Languages
  - Official: Assamese
- Time zone: UTC+5:30 (IST)
- PIN: 781354
- Vehicle registration: AS
- Website: kamrup.nic.in

Ramgaon is a village in Kamrup rural district, in Assam in northeast India. It is situated in north bank of the Brahmaputra river. It is surrounded by Goreswar and Baihata

== Transport ==
The village is located north of National Highway 31, connected to nearby towns and cities with regular buses and other modes of transportation.

== See also ==
- Titkuri
- Tinali
- Tengajhar
