= Tirtheswar Hazarika =

Indian activist

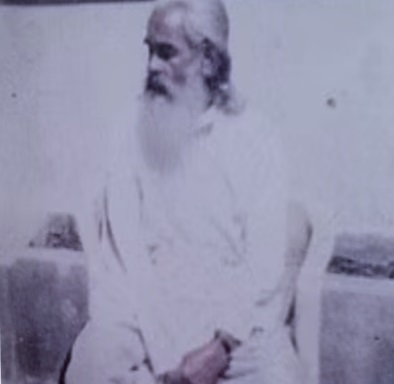
- Born: 1901; Lakhimpur District, Assam, India
- Died: 1986 (aged 84–85); Lakhimpur District, Assam, India
- Occupations: Lawyer, freedom fighter, Gandhian activist
- Political party: Indian National Congress
- Movement: Indian Independence movement
- Spouse: Mokshada Devi
- Children: 7 (incl. Iswar Prasanna Hazarika)

Tirtheswar Hazarika (Assamese: তীৰ্থেশ্বৰ হাজৰিকা, 1901–1986) was a freedom fighter, lawyer and Gandhian activist from North Lakhimpur in the Northeast Indian state of Assam. As a follower of Gandhi and a leader of the Indian National Congress, he participated in several movements associated with India's struggle for independence that were initiated or promoted by the Congress, such as the Non-Cooperation Movement, Civil Disobedience Movement, Quit India Movement and the Swadeshi Movement. He led the movement in the greater Lakhimpur region of Assam that included, in addition to the present-day territory of Lakhimpur, other regions, such as Dibrugarh and Dhemaji. He faced action from the British Indian government in the form of imprisonment, seizure of property and violence.

Hazarika also participated in the Assam Movement of the early 1980s.

== Personal life and family ==
Tirtheswar Hazarika was born in the year 1901 in North Lakhimpur, a town in the eastern part of what was then the British Indian province of Assam. Hazarika was a lawyer by profession, before giving up his work as a lawyer to participate in India's struggle for independence. He was married to Mokshada Devi, with whom he had seven children. His children include Iswar Prasanna Hazarika, who himself was a freedom fighter, as well as a politician and bureaucrat.

== Participation in the Indian Independence Movement ==
Tirtheswar Hazarika was actively involved in India's struggle for independence. At the time of his birth in 1901, India was under British colonial rule. Hazarika was deeply influenced by the ideas of Mahatma Gandhi, who advocated a non-violent and passive resistance to British rule in India. Gandhi had returned to India from present day South Africa in January 1915, when Hazarika was merely 14 years old. Having read Gandhi's philosophy, young Tirtheswar Hazarika travelled more than seventy kilometers by a bicycle to meet him in Jorhat on his first visit to Assam in 1921. This was during the Non-Cooperation Movement, in which Hazarika participated. Hazarika took a leading role in the movement in the undivided Lakhimpur region, as a result of which, he was imprisoned for three months and his property was seized by the government. During the time of the Quit India Movement that had started in 1942, Hazarika once again took a leading role. Hazarika had by then become the president of the Indian National Congress' committee in Lakhimpur, which at that time also included places like Dibrugarh and Dhemaji, in addition to the present territory. His personal residence became the epicenter of the movement in the region, with meetings being held and rallies being started from the location. Due to his involvement in the movement, he was imprisoned in the Tezpur Central Jail for two years, following which, he was placed under house arrest for a year.

While he was involved in Gandhian activities, he was also influenced by some radical figures, such as Subhash Chandra Bose. Notably, he participated in processions led by Bose in Calcutta (now Kolkata) during the Civil Disobedience Movement. During his participation, he also faced lathi-charge by the Calcutta Mounted Police. Despite this, as Bose's Azad Hind Fauj (Indian National Army) reached the borders of Assam towards the end of the Second World War in the Japanese Thrust Towards India, son Iswar Prasanna Hazarika reports that Tirtheswar Hazarika continued his Gandhian methods, such as spinning the charkha every morning to lend his support for the Swadeshi Movement, a movement that was based on the idea that economic independence from Britain (swawalamban) would lead to political independence for India (swaraj).

== Participation in the Assam Movement ==
The period from 1979 to 1985 marked the historic Assam Movement, which demanded the resolution of the foreigners' issue in Assam. Tirtheswar Hazarika lent his support to the cause. Feeling that the Government of India under Indira Gandhi was not handling the question well enough, he disassociated himself from her party and registered his protest by returning the Tamra Patra award, which he had earlier received, back to the government. The Tamra Patra recognises the contributions of freedom fighters to India's struggle for independence.

== Legacy ==
Tirtheswar Hazarika received the Tamra Patra from the Government of India for his contributions to the freedom struggle of India, when it was first awarded in the year 1972. He, however, returned it during the Assam Movement to show his support for the cause. Hazarika's place of activity, the town of North Lakhimpur in Assam, has a road named after him, called the "Tirtheswar Hazarika Path". An organisation, called the Tirtheswar Hazarika Memorial Trust, works to provide health services in remote villages in Northeast India. An initiative associated with it, "Biyali" (Evening), is the only geriatric care center in the state of Assam, that is based in North Lakhimpur and offers free medical services, particularly pain-related services, to the elderly people. It operates with help from the NTPC, NEEPCO and the Government of Assam.
