= Mirza Ghalib (disambiguation) =

Mirza Ghalib commonly refers to Ghalib (1797–1869), a classical Urdu and Persian poet of India.

It may also refer to:

- Mirza Ghalib (film), a 1954 Indian Hindi-Urdu biographical film
- Mirza Ghalib (TV series), a 1988 Indian biographical television drama series
- Mirza Ghalib Street, a street in central Kolkata, India
- Mirza Ghalib College, a college in Bihar, India

== See also ==
- Mirza (disambiguation)
- Ghalib Academy, New Delhi, educational and cultural institution dedicated to the poet in Delhi, India
- Ghalib Award, an Indian literary award given by the Ghalib Academy
- Ghalib ki Haveli (lit. 'Ghalib's Mansion'), residence of the poet in Ballimaran, Old Delhi, India; now a heritage site
- Ghalib Museum, New Delhi, museum dedicated to the poet in India
