= Iran Shahi =

Village in Lorestan province, Iran

Iran Shahi Persian: ايرانشاهي
- Village
- Location within Iran
- Coordinates: 34°04′03″N 48°07′40″E
- Country: Iran
- Province: Lorestan
- County: Delfan
- District: Khaveh
- Rural District: Khaveh-ye Shomali

Population (2016)
  - Total: 1,426
- Time zone: UTC+3:30 (IRST)

Iran Shahi (Persian: ايرانشاهي) (Note: Also romanized as Īrān Shāhī; also known as Īrānshāh and Īrānshahr) is a village in Khaveh-ye Shomali Rural District of Khaveh District in Delfan County, Lorestan province, Iran.

== Demographics ==
=== Population ===
At the time of the 2006 National Census, the village's population was 1,416 in 337 households, when it was in the Central District. The following census in 2011 counted 1,526 people in 406 households. The 2016 census measured the population of the village as 1,426 people in 440 households, by which time the rural district had been separated from the district in the formation of Khaveh District.
