= Mirza, Kamrup =

Mirza
- Town
- Location in Assam, India Mirza (India)
- Coordinates: 26°05′35″N 91°31′55″E
- Country: India
- State: Assam
- Region: Western Assam
- District: Kamrup

Languages
  - Official: Assamese
- Time zone: UTC+5:30 (IST)
- PIN: 781125
- ISO 3166 code: IN-AS
- Vehicle registration: AS
- Website: kamrup.nic.in

Mirza is a major town in Kamrup District, Assam, India, 781125.

Losana, Sathikarpa, Salesala, Pasania Para, Maliata, Jugipara, Santola, Matikutuni, Guwahati, Kaita Sidhi, Urput, Bongara, Deurali are the nearby cities to Mirza.

It is about 18 kilometers from Guwahati. Mirza is situated in the south bank of Bramhaputra river which is near Palashbari town.

== Education ==
The literacy rate of the town is 94%. Mirza is the educational epicenter of South Kamrup region. There are two government colleges at Mirza(মিৰ্জা). They are Dakshin Kamrup College and Dakshin Kamrup Girls' College. Apart from that one B.Ed. college, three private Junior colleges, eight High Schools (Government as well as Private), a private engineering institute 'NITS Mirza' is also located here.

== Transport ==
The town is near National Highway 17, and connected to nearby towns and cities with regular buses and other modes of transportation. Mirza Railway station is located south of town, and nearest airport is Guwahati airport.

== See also ==
- Boko
- Ramgaon
