= Khaveh-ye Jonubi Rural District =

Rural district in Lorestan province, Iran

Khaveh-ye Jonubi Rural District Persian: دهستان خاوه جنوبی
- Rural District
- Location within Iran
- Coordinates: 34°00′49″N 48°11′47″E
- Country: Iran
- Province: Lorestan
- County: Delfan
- District: Khaveh
- Established: 1987
- Capital: Barkhordar

Population (2016)
  - Total: 12,929
- Time zone: UTC+3:30 (IRST)

Khaveh-ye Jonubi Rural District (Persian: دهستان خاوه جنوبی) is in Khaveh District of Delfan County, Lorestan province, Iran. It is administered from the city of Barkhordar.

== Demographics ==
=== Population ===
At the time of the 2006 National Census, the rural district's population (as a part of the Central District) was 12,419 in 2,812 households. There were 12,977 inhabitants in 3,456 households at the following census of 2011. The 2016 census measured the population of the rural district as 12,929 in 3,751 households, by which time the rural district had been separated from the district in the formation of Khaveh District. The most populous of its 42 villages was Barkhordar (now a city), with 1,883 people.

=== Other villages in the rural district ===
- Abd ol Hoseyni
- Alefsaneh
- Ali Mirzai-ye Olya
- Ali Mirzai-ye Sofla
- Aliabad
- Aliabad Cheragh
- Aliabad-e Gavkosh
- Bagverdi-ye Bala
- Bagverdi-ye Pain
- Bagverdi-ye Vosta
- Berahma
- Cheragh
- Cheshmeh Khani-ye Olya
- Cheshmeh Khani-ye Sofla
- Eslamabad-e Gamasiyab-e Bala
- Eslamabad-e Gamasiyab-e Pain
- Gandom Ban Habib Vand
- Gav Kosh-e Olya
- Gav Kosh-e Sofla
- Gav Kosh-e Vosta
- Heydarabad
- Jafarbeygi-ye Bala
- Jafarbeygi-ye Pain
- Mohammad Mirzai
- Mohammadabad
- Mohammadjan-e Falak ol Din
- Moradabad
- Qalandar
- Sheykhabad
- Taj Amir
- Yadegar, Lorestan
