= Abdukarim Mirzayev =

Uzbek journalist, film director and blogger (born 1982)

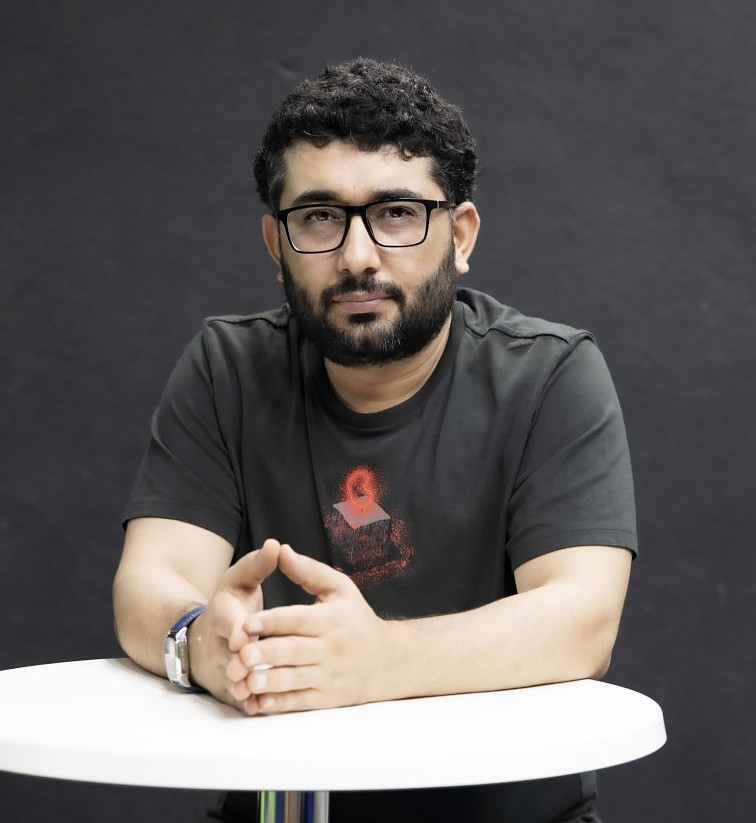
- Born: Mirzayev Abdukarim Rustamovich; February 20, 1982 (age 43); Denov District, Surxondaryo Region, Uzbek SSR
- Citizenship: Uzbek
- Education: National Institute of Art and Design (1999–2004); Kastamonu University (2018–present)
- Occupations: journalist, film director and blogger
- Years active: 2003–present
- Children: 3

Abdukarim Mirzayev (Russian: Абдукарим Мирзаев; born February 20, 1982) is an Uzbek journalist, film director and blogger. He is best known for his 2010 film, "Claim for pain", which chronicles the events in Kyrgyzstan. The film discusses ways for the intellectuals of both nations to find a way out of the current situation, to restore the good traditions of good neighborliness that have been lost as a result of the bloody events.

== Life ==
Mirzayev Abdukarim Rustamovich was born on February 20, 1982, in Denov District, Surxondaryo Region, Uzbekistan. He is married and has three children.

=== Education ===
- 1989–1997 – Pupil of the 14th comprehensive school of Denov, Surxondaryo Region.
- 1997–1999 – Student of the Academic Lyceum No. 3, Denov, Surxondaryo Region.
- 1999–2004 – Student of the Faculty of Art History of the National Institute of Art and Design of Uzbekistan named after Kamoliddin Behzod.
- 2018 – Master of Kastamonu University.

=== Work activities ===
- 2003–2005 – Journalist and radio presenter at Poytakht (Capital) radio.
- 2005–2007 – Journalist and radio presenter at Zamin Fm radio.
- 2003–2017 – Journalist and presenter of the Yoshlar TV and Radio Channel of the NTRC of Uzbekistan.
- 2013–2015 – Diydor worked as a teacher of the highest category in the educational and theater studio.

== Creative activity ==
Abdukarim Mirzayev's creative work is diverse. From 2003 to 2015, he participated in several television and radio projects and made documentaries and short stories.

=== Projects ===
==== Radio projects ====
Dilkash

The program was broadcast live on Poytaxt radio. From 2003 to 2005, the program was broadcast five days a week for three hours each. The radio project was based on live phone calls from fans and heartfelt conversations about people's social problems.

Third person radio project (Uchinchi odam radioloyihasi)

It was broadcast live on Zamin Fm radio. The project, which began in 2005, lasted twice a week, three hours each. The main goal of the project is to express the attitude of a third person to human relationships and realities.

Signature (Dasxat)

The Dasxat program is another live radio project on Zamin Fm that features heart-to-heart interviews with "not-so-famous" people in the community.

==== TV projects ====
Today's show's "Seventh Step" pageThe program was broadcast on the NTRC Yoshlar TV Channel of Uzbekistan. The show is about small and very important situations that can happen in people's lives and their causes, which calls for a broad observation based on philosophical ideas on literary, social and social issues. The show is prepared in the form of conclusions, approaches, conversations, staged stories about the events that take place in our lives.

The man on the road

The program was aired on the NTRC Yoshlar TV Channel of Uzbekistan. The show is the first tourism project to be filmed outside of Uzbekistan. "The man on the road" project was aired from February 2018 to May 2019. The duration of the show is 25–35 minutes. The show was filmed at different locations, in different cities, historical places, forests, seas and mountains. In it, the author and director Abdukarim Mirzayev expressed his views and attitudes on various topics. Various events and stories have been told in philosophical observation and on the basis of these ideas. The show on the road is a social, philosophical and entertaining project.

==== Documentaries ====
1. Sulaymontogʻ etaklarida
2. Iztirob
3. Dardga daʼvo bormi?
4. Adolat istab
5. Immigratsiyami, intigratsiyami?
6. Muhammad Yusuf (About the People's Poet of Uzbekistan Muhammad Yusuf)
7. Fenomen (About Honored Artist of Uzbekistan Otanazar Matyokubov)

===== The film "Dardga da'vo istab" =====
Abdukarim Mirzayev has made several documentaries on the events of 2010 in Kyrgyzstan. The documentary is one of the films about the 2010 riots in southern Kyrgyzstan.
