= Iswar Prasanna Hazarika =

Indian politician (1937–2024)

Member of Parliament, Lok Sabha
- In office 1996–1998
- Preceded by: Swarup Upadhyay
- Succeeded by: Moni Kumar Subba
- Constituency: Tezpur

Personal details
- Born: 22 January 1937 North Lakhimpur, Assam Province, British India
- Died: 13 May 2024 (aged 87) New Delhi, India
- Party: Indian National Congress
- Other political affiliations: Bharatiya Janata Party
- Spouse: Chhaya Hazarika
- Parent: Tirtheswar Hazarika (father)
- Education: Delhi School of Economics

Iswar Prasanna Hazarika (22 January 1937 – 13 May 2024) was an Indian politician and civil servant. He was elected to the Lok Sabha, the lower house of the Parliament of India from the Tezpur constituency as a member of the Indian National Congress.

== Life and career ==
Iswar Prasanna Hazarika was born on 22 January 1937 to lawyer and independence activist Tirtheswar Hazarika from North Lakhimpur and Mokshada Devi, both active in the Indian independence movement. Hazarika studied at Banaras Hindu University and the Delhi School of Economics, and went on to become a civil servant, serving in key positions related to public-sector undertakings, including as the Director of the Board of NTPC and the chairman and managing director of MMTC.

In 1996, Hazarika was elected as a member of the Lok Sabha from the Tezpur Lok Sabha constituency, Assam.

Dilip Kumar Neog's 204 book A Voice for Assam in Parliament presents a collection of speeches and questions raised by Hazarika during his tenure as an MP.

Hazarika died as a result of "prolonged heart ailment and associated complications" on 13 May 2024, at the age of 87.
