= Khaveh-ye Shomali Rural District =

Rural district in Lorestan province, Iran

Khaveh-ye Shomali Rural District Persian: دهستان خاوه شمالی
- Rural District
- Location within Iran
- Coordinates: 34°06′27″N 48°05′40″E
- Country: Iran
- Province: Lorestan
- County: Delfan
- District: Khaveh
- Established: 1987
- Capital: Kafraj

Population (2016)
  - Total: 7,384
- Time zone: UTC+3:30 (IRST)

Khaveh-ye Shomali Rural District (Persian: دهستان خاوه شمالی) is in Khaveh District of Delfan County, Lorestan province, Iran. Its capital is the village of Kafraj.

== Demographics ==
=== Population ===
At the time of the 2006 National Census, the rural district's population (as a part of the Central District) was 8,149 in 1,838 households. There were 8,730 inhabitants in 2,273 households at the following census of 2011. The 2016 census measured the population of the rural district as 7,384 in 2,141 households, by which time the rural district had been separated from the district in the formation of Khaveh District. The most populous of its 24 villages was Sarab Ghazanfar, with 1,642 people.

=== Other villages in the rural district ===
- Azizabad
- Deh Now-e Karam Ali
- Gav Bazeh
- Hoseyn Talayi
- Iran Shahi
- Kaleh Jub
- Karamalahi
- Nur Mohammadi Zamaneh
- Salianeh
- Shotor Khoft
- Sorkhanjub-e Olya
- Sorkhanjub-e Sofla
- Zolivar
