= Ali Mirzai-ye Olya =

Village in Lorestan province, Iran

Ali Mirzai-ye Olya Persian: علی میرزایی علیا
- Village
- Location within Iran
- Coordinates: 34°02′40″N 48°07′12″E
- Country: Iran
- Province: Lorestan
- County: Delfan
- District: Khaveh
- Rural District: Khaveh-ye Jonubi

Population (2016)
  - Total: 368
- Time zone: UTC+3:30 (IRST)

Ali Mirzai-ye Olya (Persian: علی میرزایی علیا) (Note: Also romanized as ‘Alī Mīrzā’ī-ye ‘Olyā) is a village in Khaveh-ye Jonubi Rural District of Khaveh District in Delfan County, Lorestan province, Iran.

== Demographics ==
=== Population ===
At the time of the 2006 National Census, the village's population was 378 in 85 households, when it was in the Central District. The following census in 2011 counted 352 people in 97 households. The 2016 census measured the population of the village as 368 people in 112 households, by which time the rural district had been separated from the district in the formation of Khaveh District.
