= Barkhordar =

City in Lorestan province, Iran

Barkhordar Persian: برخوردار
- City
- Location within Iran
- Coordinates: 34°02′29″N 48°10′30″E
- Country: Iran
- Province: Lorestan
- County: Delfan
- District: Khaveh
- Established: 2020

Population (2016)
  - Total: 1,883
- Time zone: UTC+3:30 (IRST)

Barkhordar (Persian: برخوردار) (Note: Also romanized as Barkhordār, Barkhvordar, Barkhvordār, and Barkhowrdār) is a city in, and the capital of, Khaveh District in Delfan County, Lorestan province, Iran. It also serves as the administrative center for Khaveh-ye Jonubi Rural District.

== Demographics ==
=== Population ===
At the time of the 2006 National Census, Barkhordar's population was 1,606 in 381 households, when it was a village in Khaveh-ye Jonubi Rural District of the Central District. The following census in 2011 counted 1,838 people in 517 households. The 2016 census measured the population of the village as 1,883 people in 565 households, by which time the rural district had been separated from the district in the formation of Khaveh District. It was the most populous village in its rural district.

Barkhordar was converted to a city in 2020.
