= Tinali =

- Locality
- Narangi Tinali
- Map showing Tinali in Assam Tinali (Assam)
- Coordinates: 26°10′52″N 91°49′56″E
- Country: India
- State: Assam
- City: Guwahati

Narangi Tinali is a locality of Guwahati, India, in the state of Assam. It is near the locality of Narengi.

== See also ==
- Udayan Vihar
- Bhetapara
