= North Lakhimpur =

- City
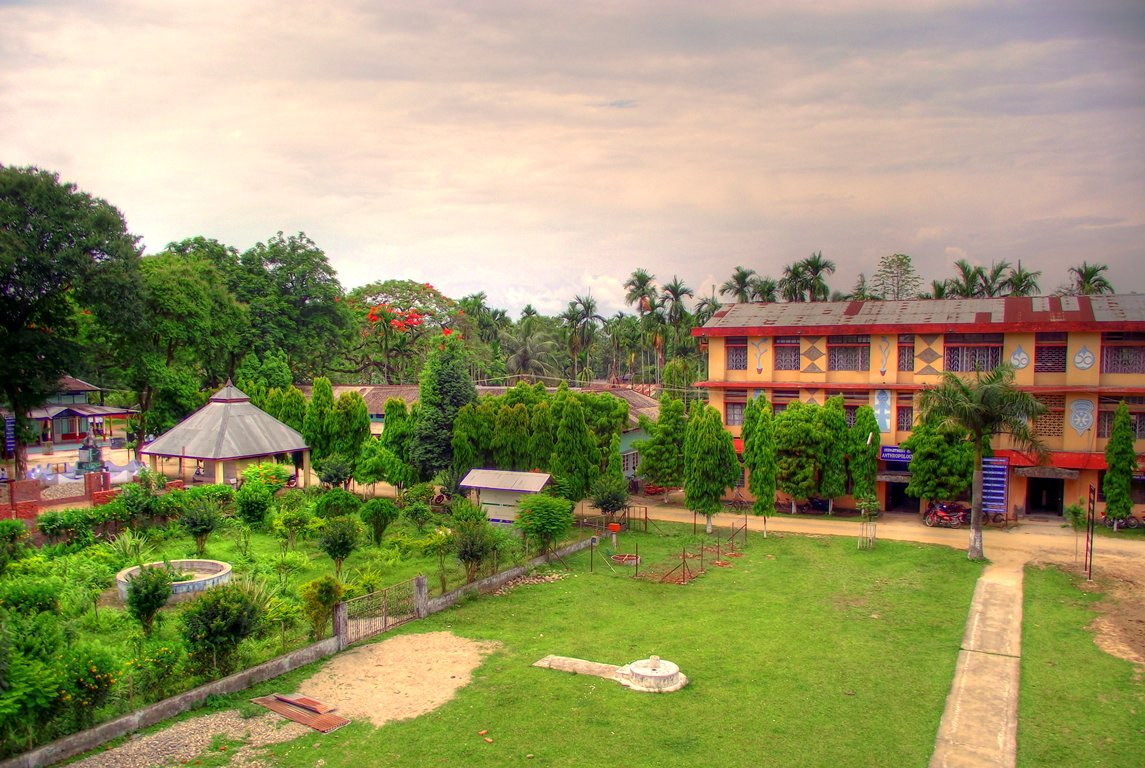
- North Lakhimpur University, North Lakhimpur

- Location in Assam, India North Lakhimpur (India)
- Coordinates: 27°14′29″N 94°6′20″E
- Country: India
- State: Assam
- District: Lakhimpur

Government
  - Body: North Lakhimpur Municipality Board

Area
  - Total: 13.74 km^{2} (5.31 sq mi)
- Elevation: 101 m (331 ft)

Population (2011)
  - Total: 105,376
  - Density: 7,669/km^{2} (19,860/sq mi)
- Time zone: UTC+5:30 (IST)
- PIN: 787001
- Telephone code: 91-3752
- ISO 3166 code: IN-AS
- Vehicle registration: AS-07
- Climate: Cwa

North Lakhimpur (/ˌlækɪmˈpʊər/ LAK-im-POOR) is a city and a municipal board in Lakhimpur district in the Indian state of Assam, about 394 kilometres (245 mi) northeast of Guwahati. It is the district headquarters of Lakhimpur district.

North Lakhimpur is also the name of the subdivision of Lakhimpur district where North Lakhimpur town is located.

== Geography ==
It is situated at 27° 13' 60 N and 94° 7' 0 E. Significant parts of Lakhimpur include Phulbari, Laluk, Harmuti, Bongalmora, Bihpuria, Boginodi, Dolohat, Dhakuakhana, Narayanpur, Nowboicha, Town Bantow, Chetiagaon, Khelmati, NT Road, DK Road, KB Road, CD Road, Nakari, Bormuria, Panigaon, Joyhing and Moidomia, Angarkhuwa, Dhakuwakhania Goan, Hansuwa Tiniali etc..

=== Climate ===
Climate data for North Lakhimpur (1991–2020, extremes 1954–present)
Month	Jan	Feb	Mar	Apr	May	Jun	Jul	Aug	Sep	Oct	Nov	Dec	Year
Record high °C (°F)	32.3 (90.1)	33.7 (92.7)	36.4 (97.5)	38.6 (101.5)	39.2 (102.6)	38.9 (102.0)	38.5 (101.3)	39.9 (103.8)	38.5 (101.3)	38.0 (100.4)	35.5 (95.9)	31.3 (88.3)	39.9 (103.8)
Mean daily maximum °C (°F)	24.4 (75.9)	25.5 (77.9)	27.4 (81.3)	28.6 (83.5)	30.4 (86.7)	31.4 (88.5)	31.9 (89.4)	32.5 (90.5)	31.9 (89.4)	31.1 (88.0)	28.8 (83.8)	26.3 (79.3)	29.2 (84.6)
Daily mean °C (°F)	17.1 (62.8)	19.2 (66.6)	22.2 (72.0)	24.2 (75.6)	26.3 (79.3)	28.2 (82.8)	28.3 (82.9)	29.0 (84.2)	28.0 (82.4)	26.2 (79.2)	22.2 (72.0)	18.3 (64.9)	24.1 (75.4)
Mean daily minimum °C (°F)	9.2 (48.6)	12.3 (54.1)	15.9 (60.6)	19.0 (66.2)	21.9 (71.4)	23.9 (75.0)	24.5 (76.1)	24.7 (76.5)	23.7 (74.7)	20.4 (68.7)	14.8 (58.6)	10.2 (50.4)	18.3 (64.9)
Record low °C (°F)	2.7 (36.9)	4.3 (39.7)	8.1 (46.6)	11.1 (52.0)	15.1 (59.2)	19.5 (67.1)	19.4 (66.9)	20.2 (68.4)	18.3 (64.9)	10.4 (50.7)	6.3 (43.3)	3.1 (37.6)	2.7 (36.9)
Average rainfall mm (inches)	28.1 (1.11)	56.3 (2.22)	97.9 (3.85)	195.3 (7.69)	395.2 (15.56)	626.7 (24.67)	627.2 (24.69)	558.7 (22.00)	412.3 (16.23)	167.8 (6.61)	25.3 (1.00)	14.5 (0.57)	3,205.3 (126.19)
Average rainy days	2.8	5.0	7.9	12.6	15.8	20.7	22.3	18.7	14.5	7.0	2.1	1.4	130.7
Average relative humidity (%) (at 17:30 IST)	77	73	70	75	78	83	83	83	86	84	81	79	79
Source 1: India Meteorological Department
Source 2: Tokyo Climate Center (mean temperatures 1991–2020)

== Demographics ==
As of the 2001 India census, North Lakhimpur had a population of 54,262. Based on population, it is classified as a class-II city (between 50,000 and 99,999 inhabitants). According to the 2011 census, it has a population of 105,376.

Males constituted 53% of the population and females 47%. North Lakhimpur has an average literacy rate of 89%, higher than the national average of 65%: male literacy is 90%, and female literacy is 87%. In North Lakhimpur, 13% of the population is under 6 years of age.

=== Language ===
Languages spoken in North Lakhimpur (2011)
1. Assamese (68.5%)
2. Bengali (16.6%)
3. Hindi (10.7%)
4. Mishing (2.00%)
5. Bhojpuri (1.00%)
6. Other (1.72%)

Assamese is the most spoken language at 40,972 speakers, followed by Bengali at 9,942, Mishing is spoken by 1,195 people and Hindi at 6,383.

== Administration ==
The MLA of Lakhimpur constituency is Shri Manab Deka since 2021.

== Transportation ==
=== Road ===
The NH-15 passes through North Lakhimpur. Both AC and non-AC buses are available from Assam State Transport Corporation. Vehicles from private bus stands also offer connections to Guwahati and ply other long-distance routes.

=== Rail ===
The North Lakhimpur railway station is located at Nakari. It lies on the Rangiya–Murkongselek section of Rangiya railway division. Intercity Express (Murkongselek-Kamakhya) to and from Guwahati is operating between North Lakhimpur and Guwahati via Rangia, Rangapara, Biswanath Chariali, etc. Another Intercity Express (Naharlagun-Guwahati) also operates between Harmuti and Guwahati via the same route. The Harmuti railway station is situated at Harmuti, approximately 30 km. from the North Lakhimpur.

=== Air ===
Lilabari Airport is located 8 kilometres (5.0 mi) from the city. Flights are operated to Kolkata and Guwahati by Alliance Air, four days in a week.

=== Water ===
One can travel to Dibrugarh, Sivasagar and Jorhat (via Majuli) by crossing the Brahmaputra River by ferry from North Lakhimpur. The Bogibeel Bridge creates a direct route for a quick commute to Dibrugarh.

== Education ==
=== Universities ===
- Madhabdev University
- North Lakhimpur University

=== Colleges ===
- Lakhimpur Girls' College
- Lakhimpur Kendriya Mahavidyalaya
- Lakhimpur Medical College and Hospital
- Lakhimpur Telahi Kamalabaria College

=== Schools ===
- St. Mary's Senior Secondary School

== Media ==
Lakhimpur has an All India Radio relay station known as Akashvani Lakhimpur. It broadcasts on FM frequencies.

=== Print media ===
Assamese language newspapers published from North Lakhimpur include the Asomiya Pratidin and Amar Asom.

== Notable people ==
- Padmanath Gohain Baruah
- Tirtheswar Hazarika
- Iswar Prasanna Hazarika
- Uddhab Bharali, innovator
