= Mirzaitovo =

Mirzaitovo Мирзаитово
- Village
- Location within Bashkortostan Location within Russia
- Coordinates: 54°57′N 53°37′E
- Country: Russia
- Region: Bashkortostan
- District: Bakalinsky District
- Time zone: UTC+5:00

Mirzaitovo (Russian: Мирзаитово; Bashkir: Мирзаһит, Mirzahit) is a rural locality (a village) in Urmanayevsky Selsoviet, Bakalinsky District, Bashkortostan, Russia. The population was 87 as of 2010. There are 3 streets.

== Geography ==
Mirzaitovo is located 32 km southwest of Bakaly (the district's administrative centre) by road. Narat-Yelga is the nearest rural locality.
