= Regional Institute of Science and Technology =

The Regional Institute of Science & Technology (RIST) was established in 2009 by the Erd Foundation (a charitable trust). It is a technical college in the north eastern region of India. The college and courses are recognized by the All India Council for Technical Education (AICTE) and affiliated to The North Eastern Hill University, Shillong, Meghalaya. The RIST was created to meet the need for technical personnel in northeast India.

The college offers bachelor's degrees in six engineering fields: computer science, electronics and communication, information technology, electrical and electronic engineering, mechanical engineering, and civil engineering.

== Location ==
The institute is located on the hills of 9th Mile, opposite the CRPF group centre, Khanapara, Ri-Bhoi district of Meghalaya. It is 6 km (4 mi) from Dispur, the capital of Assam and 85 km (53 mi) from Shillong, the capital of Meghalaya.

== Branches ==
The college offers BTech courses in:

- Computer Science & Engineering
- Electrical & Electronics Engineering
- Electronics & Communication Engineering
- Information Technology
- Mechanical Engineering
- Civil Engineering

The courses are affiliated to North-Eastern Hill University.

== Intake ==
The following are the intake for each branch:

- Computer Science & Engineering 120
- Electrical & Electronics Engineering 60
- Electronics & Communication Engineering 60
- Information Technology 60
- Mechanical Engineering 60
- Civil Engineering 120

== Admission ==
There are several ways to apply for admission to the RIST. Candidates with a valid AIEEE score can apply directly, while those without an AIEEE score can take the Common Entrance Test conducted by the ERD Foundation. There are also reserved seats for candidates from all northeastern states, who are selected by the Director of Technical Education.

== Facilities ==
- Computerized library
- Residential accommodation in separate hostels for boys and girls.
- Fleet of buses for transport.
- Dedicated leased line internet connectivity
- More than 100 desktop terminals in a network with a server farm.
- Other facilities includes gym, fitness studio, health care, IT centre, cafes and restaurants.

== See also ==
- University of Science and Technology Meghalaya
