= Cheshmeh Khani Firuzabad =

Cheshmeh Khani Firuzabad چشمه خاني فيروزاباد
- Village
- Location within Iran
- Coordinates: 30°43′48″N 51°26′40″E
- Country: Iran
- Province: Kohgiluyeh and Boyer-Ahmad
- County: Boyer-Ahmad
- Bakhsh: Central
- Rural District: Sarrud-e Jonubi

Population (2006)
  - Total: 274
- Time zone: UTC+3:30 (IRST)
  - Summer (DST): UTC+4:30 (IRDT)

Cheshmeh Khani Firuzabad (Persian: چشمه خاني فيروزاباد, also Romanized as Cheshmeh Khānī Fīrūzābād; also known as Cheshmeh Khānī) is a village in Sarrud-e Jonubi Rural District, in the Central District of Boyer-Ahmad County, Kohgiluyeh and Boyer-Ahmad Province, Iran. At the 2006 census, its population was 274, in 66 families.
