= Muhammad Yusuf (poet) =

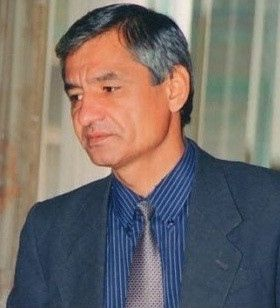
Muhammad Yusuf

Muhammad Yusuf (given name: Muhammadjon Yusupov, 1954−2001) was an Uzbek poet.

Yusuf was born in 1954 in the Marhamat district of Andizhan within the Uzbek SSR, Soviet Union. He was known as Uzbek poet in 1998. He wrote many books, most notably Yolg'onchi yor ("Cheater fiancee" in English) in 1993, in 1998 Osmonimga olib ketaman ("Taking to Sky" in English), and Ulug'imsan, vatanim ("The great homeland" in English) in 2001.

== General References ==
- Uzbekistan Writers' Union
