= Uddhab Bharali =

Innovator from India

Uddhab Kumar Bharali
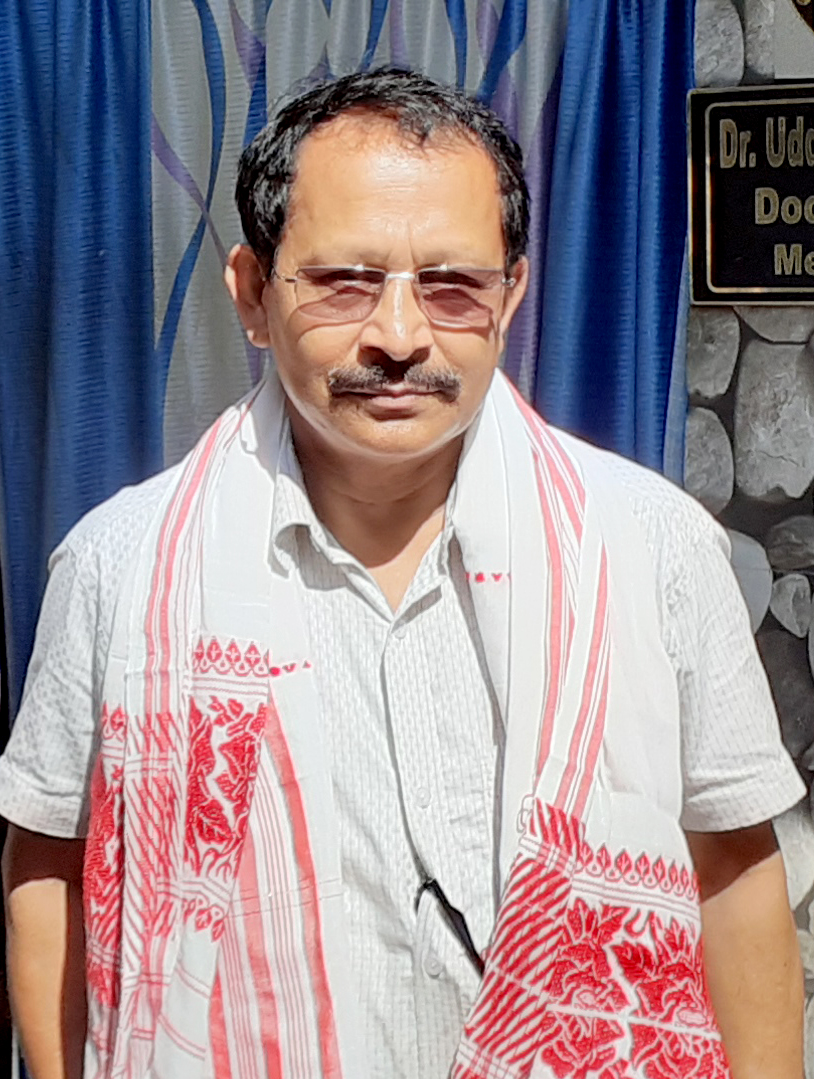
- Uddhab Kumar Bharali
- Born: 7 April 1962 (age 64); North Lakhimpur, Assam, India
- Education: Jorhat Engineering College
- Known for: Low cost, eco-friendly innovations (eg.- pomegranate deseeder)s
- Awards: President’s Grassroots Innovation Award; Shristi Samman Award; NASA Tech Create the Future Design Contest (2012, 2013); Rashtriya Ekta Samman; Padma Shri (2019)
- Scientific career
- Fields: Physics, Technology

Uddhab Bharali (born 7 April 1962) is an Indian inventor from the Lakhimpur district of Assam. Bharali is credited with more than 160 innovations, starting from the late 1980s. In 2019, he was awarded the Padma Shri.

== Early life and education ==
Bharali was born on 7 April 1962 in the Lakhimpur district of Assam. His father was a businessman.

He studied in the Government Higher Secondary School of North Lakhimpur. He then went on to study Mechanical Engineering in Jorhat Engineering College, Institute of Engineers Madras Chapter in Chennai. He left engineering school in 1988 because his family was unable to support his education due to their debt.

== Career ==
In 1988, while his family was in debt, he decided to start a polythene cover making business catering to Tea Estates in Assam. Instead of spending about ₹570,000 (US$5,900) on buying a machine, he designed his own machine for about ₹67,000 (US$700). Bharali was then determined to continue building innovations.

Bharali is known for his invention of a pomegranate de-seeder. On 3 July 2012, Bharali qualified for an online voting competition for the NASA Exceptional Technology Achievement Medal for his design of a bench-top pomegranate de-seeder. Bharali has also invented low-cost peeler machines for betel nut, cassava, garlic, jatropha, coconut and safed musli, and re-designed the Assamese paddy grinder. He also invented a low-cost bamboo processing machine. These agricultural inventions only require one person to operate.

Bharali has also focused on inventions that assist people with disabilities, including devices that help with activities of daily living, such as eating and writing. In 2019, he began working on an invention he describes as a "moving lifter", which helps a person move from a wheelchair to a bed or toilet. In 2020, he presented a moving lifter attached to a portable wheelchair to a 15-year-old boy and announced he was making additional lifters for students in the Mangaldoi and Jorhat district of Assam, and that he had released the schematics on YouTube so anyone could build the device.

Bharali runs the machine design and research centre U.K.B Agrotech at Lakhimpur. He was a speaker in TEDx at ISM Dhanbad held in October 2014.

== Honors and awards ==
Uddhab Bharali was awarded an honorary Doctorate from Assam Agricultural University (AAU) in 2014 and an honorary PhD from Kaziranga University . He has also received:

- SRISTI Samman, 2006
- National Grassroots Innovation Award from the National Innovation Foundation, 2009
- Meritorious Invention Award 2010, NRDC,
- Certificate of Merit, NRDC, 2010, from the government of India,
- Prayukty Ratna Title in 2010 from Asom Sahitya Seva,
- Shilpa Ratna Title in 2012 by Asom Satra Mahasava,
- Rashtriya Ekta Samman, in 2013,
- NICT Perfect 10 Award, ABP Media Group, and The Telegraph,
- Chief Minister Best Awardee award in 2013, from the Government of Assam,
- ERDF excellence award in 2014,
- Pratidin Time Media achiever award in 2015,
- Kamala Kanta Saikia National award in 2016,
- Asom Gourav award in 2016,
- Romoni Gabhoru award in 2016, from Atasu Assam,
- Swayamsiddh Shri Rashtriya Swayamsiddh Samman in 2017, by JSPL,
- Winner Of Engineering Design, in a contest organised by NASA, Tech Briefs Media called "Create The Future Design Contest 2012" for a bench-top pomegranate de-seeder - which was placed 2nd in the Top Ten Most Popular Inventions category
- Winner NASA tech brief "Create the Future Design contest 2013", for the invention of a detention chair for a mentally challenged person,
- Qualified for NASA tech brief "Create the Future Design contest 2014" for the invention of a feeding device for people without hands,
- Qualifier – World Tech Award in 2012, for the invention of a mini tea plant,
- Pioneer Award, in 2017,
- Excellence Award in 2018 from the Mahatma Gandhi University in Meghalaya,
- Padma Shri Award in 2019.
