= Salianeh, Selseleh =

Salianeh ساليانه
- Village
- Location within Iran
- Coordinates: 33°49′25″N 48°12′53″E
- Country: Iran
- Province: Lorestan
- County: Selseleh
- Bakhsh: Central
- Rural District: Doab

Population (2006)
  - Total: 54
- Time zone: UTC+3:30 (IRST)
  - Summer (DST): UTC+4:30 (IRDT)

Salianeh (Persian: ساليانه, also Romanized as Sālīāneh and Sālyāneh) is a village in Doab Rural District, in the Central District of Selseleh County, Lorestan Province, Iran. At the 2006 census, its population was 54, in 10 families.
