= Gavkosh, Kerman =

Gavkosh گاوكش
- Village
- Interactive map of Gavkosh
- Country: Iran
- Province: Kerman
- County: Rigan
- Bakhsh: Central
- Rural District: Gavkan

Population (2006)
  - Total: 62
- Time zone: UTC+3:30 (IRST)
  - Summer (DST): UTC+4:30 (IRDT)

Gavkosh (Persian: گاوكش, also Romanized as Gāvkosh) is a village in Gavkan Rural District, in the Central District of Rigan County, Kerman Province, Iran. At the 2006 census, its population was 62, in 16 families.
