= Mirzya (soundtrack) =

Soundtrack album by Shankar–Ehsaan–Loy and Daler Mehndi
- Released: 7 September 2016
- Recorded: 2015–2016
- Genre: Feature film soundtrack
- Length: 41:08
- Language: Hindi
- Label: T-Series

Shankar–Ehsaan–Loy chronology
Ghayal: Once Again (2016)	Mirzya (2016)	Rock On 2 (2016)

Daler Mehndi chronology
Kabab Mein Haddi (2014)	Mirzya (2016)	Ik Onkar (2017)

Mirzya is the soundtrack album to the 2016 film of the same name directed by Rakeysh Omprakash Mehra from a story written by Gulzar, loosely inspired on the Punjabi folklore of Mirza Sahiban. The film's music is composed by Shankar–Ehsaan–Loy collaborating with Mehra after Bhaag Milkha Bhaag (2013) and composed nine songs for the film, and six short songs based on the folklore has been composed by singer Daler Mehndi; all of them were written by Gulzar. The soundtrack accompanied all the 15 tracks that influenced a variety of genres such as electronic dance, jazz, blues, folk, retro, classical and Sufi music.

The soundtrack was released under the T-Series label on 7 September 2016. Music critics praised the composition, blend of genres, lyrics and instrumentation, terming it as one of Shankar–Ehsaan–Loy's finest works in their career after Dil Chahta Hai (2001) and Kal Ho Naa Ho (2003). Later appearing in several year-end and decade-end lists, the album received two nominations for Filmfare Awards, one International Indian Film Academy Award and five Mirchi Music Awards winning two.

== Development ==
In an interview to Tatsam Mukherjee of India Today, Mehra recalled that while working on the film, he thought of the French documentary film Latcho Drom (1993) that focuses on the nomads of Rajasthan, and how they change their nationalities and forms becoming Afghans, Persians, Turks, Russians and Romanians while travelling to the East France. Reminiscent of how the story told in the form of nomads coming together and singing about the folklore, he asked to Gulzar on narrating the folklore musically on the similar fashion so that it could be relevant to the current generation. As a result, Gulzar rewrote the script and made pointers on where the music would come in, so that the whole music written even before the trio's inclusion.

To make the music more rooted, the trio brought Pakistani Sufi singer Sain Zahoor and Balochistani singer Akhtar Chanal Zahri, along with Daler Mehndi and Nooran Sisters to perform the title track. According to Shankar Mahadevan, Zahoor drew pictures of the lyrics instead of providing syllables and remembered the lyrics of the words while performing the track, whereas Akhtar had "an amazing voice texture". The trio had to compose the pieces around the vocals, so that they don't appear forced. Nooran Sisters further performed "Hota Hai" and "Ek Nadhi Thi" while Mehndi, composed six songs of Gulzar's couplets based on the folklore. Classical vocalist Kaushiki Chakraborty performed "Kaaga" in her Hindi film music debut. Rajasthani singer Mame Khan performed the track "Chakora"; he earlier sang "Baawre" from Luck by Chance (2009) whose soundtrack is also composed by the same trio, before his recognition performing at Coke Studio. His inclusion was mostly to depict the ethnicity of Rajasthan in his voice, which no urban singers can achieve.

"Doli Re Doli" was earlier conceived a traditional wedding song. But as Mehra, decided to give full freedom to explore the musical reins, Loy Mendonsa decided to play jazz piano and trumpet which he improvised multiple times to make the sound unique. Ehsaan Noorani went to Chicago and recorded trumpets on live, played by instrumentalist Victor Garcia which he improvised in the third time to make the music work. Another instrumentalist Kalyan Pathak played live drums on the song and supervised the track. For the track "Teen Gawah Hain Ishq Ke" sung by Siddharth Mahadevan, he used an African choir in the interludes, which was derived as the main theme for the film. The track "Aave Re Hitchki" featured guitarist Neil Mukherjee who collaborated with the trio on "Senorita" and played flamenco guitar on the track; Noorani added that it "takes the song up to another level". Overall, the trio recorded 300 hours of music for the film.

== Marketing and release ==
Mirzya's soundtrack was preceded by the title track which released as a single on 1 September 2016, and "Teen Gawah Hain Ishq Ke" as the second single 7 September. The full album was launched by T-Series that day, to digital music platforms and a physical launch event would follow, two days later. The event, which was held in Mumbai, was preceded by several Bollywood personalities which analysts described it as one of the biggest Hindi film events of that year. Post the album's release, music videos for "Chakora", "Aave Re Hitchki" and "Hota Hai" were released on 13, 21 and 30 September 2016.

== Track listing ==
No.	Title	Music	Singer(s)	Length
1.	"Mirzya"	Shankar–Ehsaan–Loy	Daler Mehndi, Sain Zahoor, Akhtar Chanal Zahri, Nooran Sisters	3:19
2.	"Teen Gawah Hain Ishq Ke"	Shankar–Ehsaan–Loy	Siddharth Mahadevan, Sain Zahoor	4:38
3.	"Chakora"	Shankar–Ehsaan–Loy	Mame Khan, Suchismita Das, Akhtar Chinnal, Shankar Mahadevan	3:38
4.	"Aave Re Hitchki"	Shankar–Ehsaan–Loy	Mame Khan & Shankar Mahadevan	5:44
5.	"Hota Hai"	Shankar–Ehsaan–Loy	Nooran Sisters, Sain Zahoor, Akhtar Chinnal & Daler Mehndi	5:05
6.	"Ek Nadi Thi"	Shankar–Ehsaan–Loy	Nooran Sisters, Mohan Kannan	3:24
7.	"Doli Re Doli"	Shankar–Ehsaan–Loy	Shankar Mahadevan & Mame Khan	5:33
8.	"Kaaga"	Shankar–Ehsaan–Loy	Kaushiki Chakraborty	2:39
9.	"Mirzya Theme – Broken Arrows"	Shankar–Ehsaan–Loy	Instrumental	2:37
10.	"Yeh Wadiyan Doodiyan Kohre Ki"	Daler Mehndi	Daler Mehndi	0:31
11.	"Mirza Se Darre Khuda"	Daler Mehndi	Daler Mehndi	0:33
12.	"Mera Mirza Sher Jawan"	Daler Mehndi	Daler Mehndi	0:47
13.	"Lahoo Luhaan Zameen Hui"	Daler Mehndi	Daler Mehndi	0:44
14.	"Puchh Na Pende Mamle"	Daler Mehndi	Daler Mehndi	0:37
15.	"Phaa Paye Na Ishq Da"	Daler Mehndi	Daler Mehndi	1:09
Total length:				41:08

== Reception ==
=== Critical ===
The soundtrack was critically acclaimed, with praise for its curation, composition, songwriting and other aspects, calling it as one of the best works of Shankar–Ehsaan–Loy. Devarsi Ghosh of India Today called it as "the most accomplished Bollywood music album of the year, which not just gives us new sounds, but also has incredible lyrical richness". Devesh Sharma of Filmfare gave 4.5 stars out of five calling it as "one of the most complete, most ambitious film albums to have come out this year". Sreeju Sudhakaran of Bollywood Life called it as the best album of the year "when it comes to experimentation, variety and judicious usage of brilliant singers and tunes" and also the trio's best since Dil Chahta Hai (2001). He reviewed it as "a sureshot treat to anyone who has a keen ear for great music".

Sankhayan Ghosh of Mint wrote "Mirzya achieves a beautiful balance rare in current film music. A melting pot of genres, there is a lot going on in the album. Yet SEL doesn’t let that overwhelm us by maintaining a touch of lightness, a hallmark of the composer trio. They have delivered an inspired album with a legendary poet and a musically passionate filmmaker." In his four-star review, Vipin Nair of Music Aloud (also for The Hindu) called it as "a rich, remarkably diverse set of songs from Shankar Ehsaan Loy". Rinky Kumar of The Times of India also gave the same rating to the album and wrote "album is lyrically rich and stands out from the kind of music that is being composed today. SEL, who are synonymous with tracks that have more of a western influence, surprise listeners by using traditional, folk sounds and fusing them with contemporary beats in this soundtrack. Clearly, this is one of their best works till date." Karthik Srinivasan of Milliblog wrote "From Katyar Kaljat Ghusli (2015), the trio take another giant leap ahead in Mirzya!"

Suanshu Khurana of The Indian Express wrote "Mirzya, musically, is an interesting experiment that has had SEL deliver some of their finest pieces ever. Barring a couple of ditties that should be ignored, Mirzya is a fascinating album that should be heard." Joginder Tuteja of Bollywood Hungama rated 3.5 stars saying "the music of Mirzya is different sure. While for purists it would be something to revel about, the masses would take some time to get used to its sound." Although being critical of the album's length due to the inclusion of several numbers, Swetha Ramakrishnan of Firstpost added that, "it takes serious talent and vision to have this kind of music in a commercial Hindi film, at a time when old indipop songs are given a Badshaah rap and re-released. For this, take a bow Shankar-Ehsaan-Loy." Manish Gaekwad of Scroll.in although praising the music "that pumps the heartbeat" he noted the absence of "a bona fide romantic anthem, the kind that will echo through the years, like the love story."

=== Commercial ===
In his year-ender review for The Hindu, Vipin Nair ranked Mirzya as the "Best Bollywood Album of 2016", and also in the decade-end analysis of Hindi film music, calling Mirzya as Shankar–Ehsaan–Loy's best works in his collaboration with Mehra along with Bhaag Milkha Bhaag (2013). Manish Gaekwad of Scroll.in also noted the album in his year-ender review but felt that the film's underperformance had impacted on the music's longevity. Sankhayan Ghosh of Mint also listed in its year-ender, calling the film's soundtrack as "a kaleidoscopic Hindi film musical given the Coke Studio Pakistan treatment"; he ranked the film's box-office failure and the soundtrack's success to another similar film Bombay Velvet (2015), whose soundtrack by Amit Trivedi was appreciated.

The album was listed in several decade-ender lists, which included Devesh Sharma's article for Filmfare that was published on World Music Day (21 June 2021), Akshay Manwani's review for Firstpost and Sankhayan Ghosh's review for Film Companion. Tatsam Mukherjee's article for Huffington Post about "The Top 20 Bollywood Albums Since 2000" ranked it as their second-best album describing it as "Shankar-Ehsaan-Loy at their most evolved". Despite the film's commercial underperformance, Shankar–Ehsaan–Loy admitted the album as one of their best works in their career, ranking in the similar ways to Dil Chahta Hai (2001) or Kal Ho Na Ho (2003).

"Without being immodest, I don’t see any album in the last five years that has come out from this industry which is of the level of Mirzya . When the greatest writer in this country, Gulzar Saab, says that [working on] this album reminded him of the way he used to work with Pancham (Rahul Dev Burman), I think, we can’t get a bigger compliment than this."

— Shankar Mahadevan, describing his experiences on working in Mirzya.

== Accolades ==
Award	Date of ceremony	Category	Recipient(s)	Result	Ref.
Filmfare Awards	14 January 2017	Best Music Director	Shankar–Ehsaan–Loy	Nominated	
Filmfare Awards	14 January 2017	Best Lyricist	Gulzar ("Mirzya")	Nominated	
Filmfare Awards	14 January 2017	Best Lyricist	Gulzar ("Aava Re Hitchki")	Nominated	
International Indian Film Academy Awards	14–15 July 2017	Best Lyricist	Gulzar ("Aava Re Hitchki")	Nominated	
Mirchi Music Awards	18 February 2017	Raag-Inspired Song of the Year	"Kaaga"	Nominated	
Mirchi Music Awards	18 February 2017	Best Song Producer (Programming and Arranging)	Shankar–Ehsaan–Loy and Santosh Mulekar ("Kaaga")	Won	
Mirchi Music Awards	18 February 2017	Best Song Producer (Programming and Arranging)	Shankar–Ehsaan–Loy ("Mirzya")	Nominated	
Mirchi Music Awards	18 February 2017	Best Song Engineer (Recording and Mixing)	Tanay Gajjar, Abhay Rumde, Gaurav Gupta, Manasi Tare, Abhishek Khandelwal and Shantanu Hudlikar ("Mirzya")	Nominated	
Mirchi Music Awards	18 February 2017	Best Background Score	Tubby-Parik	Won	
Mirchi Music Awards	11 March 2021	Background Score of The Decade	Tubby-Parik	Nominated	
Stardust Awards	20 December 2016	Best Music Album	T-Series	Nominated	
Stardust Awards	20 December 2016	Best Music Director	Shankar–Ehsaan–Loy	Nominated	
Stardust Awards	20 December 2016	Best Lyricist	Gulzar ("Mirzya" and "Aava Re Hitchki")	Nominated	
Stardust Awards	20 December 2016	Best Playback Singer (Male)	Daler Mehndi ("Mirzya")	Nominated	
Stardust Awards	20 December 2016	Best Playback Singer (Female)	Nooran Sisters ("Hota Hai")	Nominated	
