= Raazi (soundtrack) =

Soundtrack album by Shankar–Ehsaan–Loy
- Released: 19 April 2018
- Studios: Purple Haze Studios, Mumbai
- Genre: Feature film soundtrack
- Length: 18:58
- Language: Hindi
- Label: Zee Music Company
- Producer: Shankar–Ehsaan–Loy

Shankar–Ehsaan–Loy chronology
Aiyaary (2018)	Raazi (2018)	Soorma (2018)
External audio
- Audio Jukebox on YouTube

Raazi is the soundtrack album to the 2018 film of the same name directed by Meghna Gulzar and produced by Dharma Productions and Junglee Pictures, starring Alia Bhatt and Vicky Kaushal. The film's musical score is composed by Shankar–Ehsaan–Loy and lyrics written by Gulzar.

As with Meghna's previous film Talvar (2015), the film featured four songs composed by the trio, which was comparatively less than their previous compositions which had more than five songs. All the songs were curated in an organic manner, with the lyrics being written first and the tunes later. They further utilized traditional instruments, staying authentic to the influences of Kashmiri music.

The soundtrack was released under the Zee Music Company label on 19 April 2018 to positive reviews from critics, with the use of minimal numbers in the narrative, instrumentation and soundscape being complimented and Gulzar's lyrics attracted high praise. The album further won two awards each at the Filmfare, International Indian Film Academy, News18 and Zee Cine Awards, as well as three Screen Awards and a Mirchi Music Award for Lyricist of The Year to Gulzar.

== Development ==
Shankar–Ehsaan–Loy composed the musical score and soundtrack to Raazi in their first collaboration with Meghna Gulzar. The album had four songs composed by the trio, comparatively less to their previous films which had more than five to six songs, as "Raazi is not the kind of film that can be packed with songs", according to Ehsaan Noorani, who further added: "[Meghna Gulzar] is true to her film and its script, and will not include a song unless it is absolutely necessary. We could have created a six-song album out of which two would not have been used in the movie, but that would have been a waste." Shankar Mahadevan added that all the songs were composed straight from the heart.

Raazi is set in Jammu and Kashmir which had strong music influences and used in the soundscape of the film. Shankar Mahadevan added that "melodically, the scales that we used had Afghani and Middle-Eastern influences. That's evident in the title track sung by Arijit Singh and Dilbaro, which starts with a Kashmiri folk song." The trio used rabab and Afghani and Kashmiri instruments such as udu pots, hand drums and frame drums; these instruments were earlier used for Mission Kashmir. They also refrained the use of electronic instruments, despite the popularity of electronic dance music during late-2010s.

== Composition ==
The song "Ae Watan" was demanded crucial to the story, whereas the title track "Raazi" takes the story forward; Gulzar stated that he wanted "Ae Watan" to become the song of the nation, adding "It speaks for all of us and it speaks without any prejudice. People keep asking what nationalism is all about. Well, one can define nationalism through this song." The composition of "Ae Watan" began first with lyrics, which Gulzar had written first, before the entire track was curated, as the song dictated the melody. All the songs were curated in the organic manner.

The trio composed "Ae Watan" in Gulzar's living room and completed within five minutes, though the portion "Lab Pe Aati Hai Dua" written by Islamic philosopher and poet Muhammad Iqbal, was used later onwards by Gulzar, it was included seamlessly so that "people from both sides of the border can sing it. That is the beauty of it – there is no prejudice of the border in this song. The film might be based on a historical incident, but it does not promote any kind of prejudice or bias."

The song "Dilbaro" is a traditional number, which had influences from Kashmiri folk, which according to Gulzar, reflected the theme of the film. A particular line in the song, "ungli pakad ke tune chalna sikhaya tha na, dehleez unchi hai yeh paar kara de" (transl. you taught me to walk by holding my finger, the threshold is high help me cross it), according to Mahadevan, "can apply to any song based on bidaai (transl. parting)" but in the film's context, "you are talking about a daughter whose father is sending her as an Indian spy to Pakistan. She gets married and crosses the border, not just as a bride, but also as a spy. She tells her father, 'This dehleez (transl. threshold) is too high for me, please help me cross'. What a way to interpret two distinct thoughts in the same vein."

== Release ==
The soundtrack was released through Zee Music Company on 11 April 2018.

== Reception ==
Vipin Nair of The Hindu described the album as "a gem of a soundtrack". Debarati Sen of The Times of India wrote: "the 18-minute-long soundtrack of Raazi, is a medley of tunes and is a must for music lovers and Gulzar fans." Devesh Sharma of Filmfare rated four out of five, and summarized it as "a short, sweet album well in keeping with the film's theme and makes an effective comeback for [Shankar–Ehsaan–Loy]." Devarsi Ghosh of Scroll.in stated "Raazi's soundtrack is not the sound and the fury one would expect from a collaboration between Gulzar and Shankar-Ehsaan-Loy. Despite appearing to be a utilitarian soundtrack for a thriller with minimal space for songs, it does have its moments."

Suanshu Khurana of The Indian Express rated three out of five and wrote: "it's a brilliant effort. But one wishes it had more songs sand more Kashmiri influences. Buy it for Raazi, and its beautiful contours." Devansh Sharma of Firstpost summarized that "While Arijit and Sunidhi's 'Ae Watan' goes all out in its patriotic overtone, songs like 'Dilbaro' and 'Raazi' look at the film through a micro lens." Karthik Srinivasan of Milliblog said "For their total absence in 2017, Shankar Ehsaan Loy deliver a rich, thematic soundtrack to open 2018."

== Track listing ==
No.	Title	Singer(s)	Length
1.	"Ae Watan" (Male)	Arijit Singh	3:43
2.	"Dilbaro"	Harshdeep Kaur, Vibha Saraf, Shankar Mahadevan	5:14
3.	"Raazi"	Arijit Singh	6:30
4.	"Ae Watan" (Female)	Sunidhi Chauhan	3:31
Total length:			18:58

== Personnel ==
- Shankar–Ehsaan–Loy – music composer
- Tubby – co-producer
- Mani Mahadevan – chorus
- Ravi Mishra – chorus
- Binaya Mohanty – chorus
- Arun Kamath – chorus
- Arshad Mohammed – chorus
- Shankar Mahadevan Academy – kids chorus
- Soham Vavekar – kids vocals
- Advait Raman Shankar – kids vocals
- Tanirika Chakraborty – kids vocals
- Vasudha Tiwari – kids vocals
- Ananya Halarnkar – kids vocals
- Tejas Tambe – kids vocals
- Ghazal Javed – kids vocals
- Archana Hegdekar – kids vocals
- Satyajeet Jena – kids vocals
- Tapas Roy – rabab, dotara, mandolin, bouzouki
- Arshad Khan – esraj
- Dipesh Varma – live rhythm, percussions
- Satyajit Jamsandekar – percussions
- Shikhar Naad Qureshi – percussions
- Abhay Rumde – recording engineer (Purple Haze Studios, Mumbai)
- Sreejith Padmakumar – recording engineer (Purple Haze Studios, Mumbai)
- Vijay Benegal – mixing engineer (Sound Ideaz, Mumbai)
- Ameya Jichkar – mixing assistance (Sound Ideaz, Mumbai)
- Donal Whelan – mastering engineer (Hafod Mastering Studios, Masteringworld, London)

== Accolades ==
Award (Note: Awards, festivals and organizations are in alphabetical order.)	Date of ceremony (Note: Date is linked to the article about the awards held that year, wherever possible.)	Category	Recipient(s)	Result	Ref.
Filmfare Awards	23 March 2019	Best Music Director	Shankar–Ehsaan–Loy	Nominated	
Filmfare Awards	23 March 2019	Best Background Score	Shankar–Ehsaan–Loy	Nominated	
Filmfare Awards	23 March 2019	Best Lyricist	Gulzar – ("Ae Watan")	Won	
Filmfare Awards	23 March 2019	Best Lyricist	Gulzar – ("Dilbaro")	Nominated	
Filmfare Awards	23 March 2019	Best Male Playback Singer	Arijit Singh – ("Ae Watan")	Won	
Filmfare Awards	23 March 2019	Best Male Playback Singer	Shankar Mahadevan – ("Dilbaro")	Nominated	
Filmfare Awards	23 March 2019	Best Female Playback Singer	Harshdeep Kaur and Vibha Saraf – ("Dilbaro")	Nominated	
Filmfare Awards	23 March 2019	Best Female Playback Singer	Sunidhi Chauhan – ("Ae Watan")	Nominated	
International Indian Film Academy Awards	18 September 2019	Best Music Director	Shankar–Ehsaan–Loy	Nominated	
International Indian Film Academy Awards	18 September 2019	Best Lyricist	Gulzar – ("Ae Watan")	Nominated	
International Indian Film Academy Awards	18 September 2019	Best Male Playback Singer	Arijit Singh – ("Ae Watan")	Won	
International Indian Film Academy Awards	18 September 2019	Best Female Playback Singer	Harshdeep Kaur and Vibha Saraf – ("Dilbaro")	Won	
International Indian Film Academy Awards	18 September 2019	Best Female Playback Singer	Sunidhi Chauhan – ("Ae Watan")	Nominated	
Mirchi Music Awards	16 February 2019	Lyricist of The Year	Gulzar – ("Ae Watan")	Won	
Mirchi Music Awards	16 February 2019	Lyricist of The Year	Gulzar – ("Dilbaro")	Nominated	
Mirchi Music Awards	16 February 2019	Song of The Year	"Dilbaro"	Nominated	
Mirchi Music Awards	16 February 2019	Song of The Year	"Ae Watan"	Nominated	
Mirchi Music Awards	16 February 2019	Album of The Year	Shankar–Ehsaan–Loy, Gulzar and Allama Iqbal	Nominated	
Mirchi Music Awards	16 February 2019	Male Vocalist of The Year	Arijit Singh – ("Ae Watan")	Nominated	
Mirchi Music Awards	16 February 2019	Female Vocalist of The Year	Harshdeep Kaur – ("Dilbaro")	Nominated	
Mirchi Music Awards	16 February 2019	Female Vocalist of The Year	Sunidhi Chauhan – ("Ae Watan")	Nominated	
Mirchi Music Awards	16 February 2019	Best Background Score	Shankar–Ehsaan–Loy and Tubby	Nominated	
Mirchi Music Awards	16 February 2019	Listeners' Choice Album of the Year	Shankar–Ehsaan–Loy, Gulzar and Allama Iqbal	Nominated	
News18 Reel Movie Awards	26 March 2019	Best Lyricist	Gulzar – ("Ae Watan")	Won	
News18 Reel Movie Awards	26 March 2019	Best Female Playback Singer	Harshdeep Kaur and Vibha Saraf – ("Dilbaro")	Won	
Screen Awards	16 December 2018	Best Male Playback Singer	Arijit Singh – ("Ae Watan")	Won	
Screen Awards	16 December 2018	Best Female Playback Singer	Harshdeep Kaur – ("Dilbaro")	Won	
Screen Awards	16 December 2018	Best Lyricist	Gulzar – ("Ae Watan")	Won	
Zee Cine Awards	19 March 2019	Best Music Director	Shankar–Ehsaan–Loy	Nominated	
Zee Cine Awards	19 March 2019	Best Lyrics	Gulzar – ("Dilbaro")	Won	
Zee Cine Awards	19 March 2019	Best Lyrics	Gulzar – ("Ae Watan")	Nominated	
Zee Cine Awards	19 March 2019	Best Playback Singer – Male	Arijit Singh – ("Ae Watan")	Nominated	
Zee Cine Awards	19 March 2019	Best Playback Singer – Female	Harshdeep Kaur and Vibha Saraf – ("Dilbaro")	Won	
