= Khaveh District =

District in Lorestan province, Iran

Khaveh District Persian: بخش خاوه
- District
- Location within Iran
- Coordinates: 34°03′51″N 48°09′58″E
- Country: Iran
- Province: Lorestan
- County: Delfan
- Established: 2013
- Capital: Barkhordar

Population (2016)
  - Total: 20,313
- Time zone: UTC+3:30 (IRST)

Khaveh District (Persian: بخش خاوه) is in Delfan County, Lorestan province, Iran. Its capital is the city of Barkhordar.

== History ==
In 2013, Khaveh-ye Jonubi and Khaveh-ye Shomali Rural Districts were separated from the Central District in the formation of Khaveh District. The village of Barkhordar was converted to a city in 2020.

== Demographics ==
=== Population ===
At the time of the 2016 National Census, the district's population was 20,313 inhabitants in 5,892 households.

=== Administrative divisions ===
Khaveh District Population
Administrative Divisions	2016
Khaveh-ye Jonubi RD	12,929
Khaveh-ye Shomali RD	7,384
Barkhordar (city) (Note: Became a city after the 2016 census)	
Total	20,313
RD = Rural District
