= Delfan County =

County in Lorestan province, Iran

Delfan County Persian: شهرستان دلفان
- County
- Location of Delfan County in Lorestan province (top, yellow)

- Location of Lorestan province in Iran
- Coordinates: 34°05′00″N 47°52′30″E
- Country: Iran
- Province: Lorestan
- Established: 1989
- Capital: Nurabad
- Districts: Central, Itivand, Kakavand, Khaveh, Mirbag

Population (2016)
  - Total: 143,973
- Time zone: UTC+3:30 (IRST)

Delfan County (Persian: شهرستان دلفان) (Note: Kurdish: شارسان دڵفان) is in Lorestan province, Iran. The capital of the county is the city of Nurabad.

== History ==
The village of Haft Cheshmeh was converted to a city in 2010. In 2013, Khaveh-ye Jonubi and Khaveh-ye Shomali Rural Districts were separated from the Central District in the formation of Khaveh District.

The village of Barkhordar was converted to a city in 2020. In 2022, Itivand-e Jonubi and Itivand-e Shomali Rural Districts were separated from Kakavand District in forming Itivand District. At the same time, Mirbag-e Jonubi and Mirbag-e Shomali Rural Districts were separated from the Central District to form Mirbag District.

== Demographics ==
=== Population ===
At the time of the 2006 National Census, the county's population was 137,385 in 29,257 households. The following census in 2011 counted 144,161 people in 35,598 households. The 2016 census measured the population of the county as 143,973 in 40,467 households.

=== Administrative divisions ===
Delfan County's population history and administrative structure over three consecutive censuses are shown in the following table.

Delfan County Population
Administrative Divisions	2006	2011	2016
Central District	113,787	122,324	104,533
Khaveh-ye Jonubi RD	12,419	12,977	
Khaveh-ye Shomali RD	8,149	8,730	
Mirbag-e Jonubi RD	6,636	6,639	5,819
Mirbag-e Shomali RD	13,085	13,650	12,608
Nurabad RD	9,921	11,795	13,440
Nurali RD	7,173	7,391	7,119
Nurabad (city)	56,404	61,142	65,547
Itivand District (Note: Established after the 2016 census)			
Itivand-e Jonubi RD			
Itivand-e Shomali RD			
Kakavand District	23,598	21,837	19,127
Itivand-e Jonubi RD	6,400	5,864	5,150
Itivand-e Shomali RD	3,126	2,923	2,918
Kakavand-e Gharbi RD	5,831	5,044	4,611
Kakavand-e Sharqi RD	8,241	6,958	5,578
Haft Cheshmeh (city)		1,048	870
Khaveh District			20,313
Khaveh-ye Jonubi RD			12,929
Khaveh-ye Shomali RD			7,384
Barkhordar (city) (Note: Became a city after the 2016 census)			
Mirbag District (Note: Established after the 2016 census)			
Mirbag-e Jonubi RD			
Mirbag-e Shomali RD			
Total	137,385	144,161	143,973
RD = Rural District

== Geography ==
Delfan is a mountainous region in the northwest of Lorestan province. Its capital city, Nurabad, is one of the five cities in Iran that is more than 2,000 metres (6,600 ft) above sea level and has very cold winters. The county is populated by Kurds.

== See also ==
Media related to Delfan County at Wikimedia Commons
