= Now Bahar =

Now Bahar or Naubahar or Nowbahar (Persian: نوبهار) may refer to:

- Now Bahar, Isfahan
- Now Bahar, Kerman
- Now Bahar, Bijar, Kurdistan province
- Now Bahar, Divandarreh, Kurdistan province
- Nowbahar, Saqqez, Kurdistan province
- Nowbahar, Markazi
- Now Bahar, Bajestan, Razavi Khorasan province
- Now Bahar-e Gholaman, Razavi Khorasan province
- Now Bahar-e Kordian, Razavi Khorasan province
- Now Bahar, Golbahar, Razavi Khorasan province
- Nowbahar, Nishapur, Razavi Khorasan province
- Nowbahar, Zeberkhan, Nishapur County, Razavi Khorasan province
- Now Bahar, Sabzevar, Razavi Khorasan province
- Now Bahar, South Khorasan
