= Dashtab =

Village in Razavi Khorasan province, Iran

Dashtab Persian: دشت اب
- Village
- Location within Iran
- Coordinates: 35°02′05″N 60°15′04″E
- Country: Iran
- Province: Razavi Khorasan
- County: Bakharz
- District: Bala Velayat
- Rural District: Bala Velayat

Population (2016)
  - Total: 195
- Time zone: UTC+3:30 (IRST)

Dashtab (Persian: دشت اب) (Note: Also romanized as Dashtāb) is a village in Bala Velayat Rural District of Bala Velayat District in Bakharz County, Razavi Khorasan province, Iran.

== Demographics ==
=== Population ===
At the time of the 2006 National Census, the village's population was 183 in 44 households, when it was in Bakharz Rural District (Note: Renamed Malin Rural District) of the former Bakharz District in Taybad County. The following census in 2011 counted 245 people in 58 households, by which time the district had been separated from the county in the establishment of Bakharz County. The rural district was transferred to the new Central District and renamed Malin Rural District. Dashtab was transferred to Bala Velayat Rural District in the new Bala Velayat District. The 2016 census measured the population of the village as 195 people in 64 households.
