= Bezanjerd-e Kordian =

Village in Razavi Khorasan province, Iran

Bezanjerd-e Kordian Persian: بزنجردكرديان
- Village
- Location within Iran
- Coordinates: 34°59′27″N 60°22′42″E
- Country: Iran
- Province: Razavi Khorasan
- County: Bakharz
- District: Central
- Rural District: Dasht-e Arzaneh

Population (2016)
  - Total: 475
- Time zone: UTC+3:30 (IRST)

Bezanjerd-e Kordian (Persian: بزنجردكرديان) (Note: Also romanized as Bezanjerd-e Kordīān; also known as Bezāngerd and Bezanjerd) is a village in Dasht-e Arzaneh Rural District of the Central District in Bakharz County, Razavi Khorasan province, Iran.

== Demographics ==
=== Population ===
At the time of the 2006 National Census, the village's population was 455 in 100 households, when it was in Bakharz Rural District (Note: Renamed Malin Rural District) of the former Bakharz District in Taybad County. The following census in 2011 counted 499 people in 138 households, by which time the district had been separated from the county in the establishment of Bakharz County. The rural district was transferred to the new Central District and renamed Malin Rural District. Bezanjerd-e Kordian was transferred to Dasht-e Arzaneh Rural District created in the same district. The 2016 census measured the population of the village as 475 people in 135 households.
