= Tunah =

Village in Razavi Khorasan province, Iran

Tunah Persian: تونه
- Village
- Location within Iran
- Coordinates: 34°51′48″N 60°23′04″E
- Country: Iran
- Province: Razavi Khorasan
- County: Bakharz
- District: Central
- Rural District: Malin

Population (2016)
  - Total: 530
- Time zone: UTC+3:30 (IRST)

Tunah (Persian: تونه) (Note: Also romanized as Tūnah and Tūneh) is a village in Malin Rural District (Note: Formerly Bakharz Rural District) of the Central District of Bakharz County, Razavi Khorasan province, Iran.

== Demographics ==
=== Population ===
At the time of the 2006 National Census, the village's population was 559 in 103 households, when it was in Dasht-e Taybad Rural District of Miyan Velayat District in Taybad County. The following census in 2011 counted 566 people in 138 households, by which time the village had been separated from the county in the establishment of Bakharz County. Tunah was transferred to Malin Rural District (Note: Formerly Bakharz Rural District) of the new Central District. The 2016 census measured the population of the village as 530 people in 147 households.
