= Haft Suyi =

Village in Razavi Khorasan province, Iran

Haft Suyi Persian: هفت سویی
- Village
- Location within Iran
- Coordinates: 35°07′33″N 60°09′23″E
- Country: Iran
- Province: Razavi Khorasan
- County: Bakharz
- District: Bala Velayat
- Rural District: Ashtin

Population (2016)
  - Total: 320
- Time zone: UTC+3:30 (IRST)

Haft Suyi (Persian: هفت سویی) (Note: Also romanized as Haft Sū’ī and Haft Sūyī; also known as Afsū, Haft, Haft Sui, and Haft Sūy) is a village in Ashtin Rural District of Bala Velayat District in Bakharz County, Razavi Khorasan province, Iran.

== Demographics ==
=== Population ===
At the time of the 2006 National Census, the village's population was 288 in 61 households, when it was in Bala Velayat Rural District of the former Bakharz District in Taybad County. The following census in 2011 counted 280 people in 76 households, by which time the district had been separated from the county in the establishment of Bakharz County. The rural district was transferred to the new Bala Velayat District, and the village was transferred to Ashtin Rural District created in the same district. The 2016 census measured the population of the village as 320 people in 91 households.
