= Bohlulabad, Razavi Khorasan =

Village in Razavi Khorasan province, Iran

Bohlulabad Persian: بهلول اباد
- Village
- Location within Iran
- Coordinates: 34°53′48″N 60°33′49″E
- Country: Iran
- Province: Razavi Khorasan
- County: Bakharz
- District: Central
- Rural District: Malin

Population (2016)
  - Total: 2,507
- Time zone: UTC+3:30 (IRST)

Bohlulabad (Persian: بهلول اباد) (Note: Also romanized as Bohlūlābād) is a village in Malin Rural District (Note: Formerly Bakharz Rural District) of the Central District of Bakharz County, Razavi Khorasan province, Iran.

== Demographics ==
=== Population ===
At the time of the 2006 National Census, the village's population was 2,030 in 422 households, when it was in Dasht-e Taybad Rural District of Miyan Velayat District in Taybad County. The following census in 2011 counted 2,273 people in 540 households, by which time the village had been separated from the county in the establishment of Bakharz County. Bohlulabad was transferred to Malin Rural District (Note: Formerly Bakharz Rural District) of the new Central District. The 2016 census measured the population of the village as 2,507 people in 633 households.
