= Hemmatabad, Bakharz =

Village in Razavi Khorasan province, Iran

Hemmatabad Persian: همت اباد
- Village
- Location within Iran
- Coordinates: 35°08′43″N 60°07′56″E
- Country: Iran
- Province: Razavi Khorasan
- County: Bakharz
- District: Bala Velayat
- Rural District: Ashtin

Population (2016)
  - Total: 1,673
- Time zone: UTC+3:30 (IRST)

Hemmatabad (Persian: همت اباد) (Note: Also romanized as Hemmatābād; also known as Himmatābād) is a village in, and the capital of, Ashtin Rural District in Bala Velayat District of Bakharz County, Razavi Khorasan province, Iran.

== Demographics ==
=== Population ===
At the time of the 2006 National Census, the village's population was 1,616 in 368 households, when it was in Bala Velayat Rural District of the former Bakharz District in Taybad County. The following census in 2011 counted 1,705 people in 471 households, by which time the district had been separated from the county in the establishment of Bakharz County. The rural district was transferred to the new Bala Velayat District, and Hemmatabad was transferred to Ashtin Rural District created in the same district. The 2016 census measured the population of the village as 1,673 people in 519 households, the most populous in its rural district.
