= Arzaneh, Bakharz =

Village in Razavi Khorasan province, Iran

Arzaneh Persian: ارزنه
- Village
- Location within Iran
- Coordinates: 34°58′08″N 60°10′48″E
- Country: Iran
- Province: Razavi Khorasan
- County: Bakharz
- District: Central
- Rural District: Dasht-e Arzaneh

Population (2016)
  - Total: 4,241
- Time zone: UTC+3:30 (IRST)

Arzaneh (Persian: ارزنه) is a village in, and the capital of, Dasht-e Arzaneh Rural District in the Central District of Bakharz County, Razavi Khorasan province, Iran.

== Demographics ==
=== Population ===
At the time of the 2006 National Census, the village's population was 3,574 in 815 households, when it was in Bakharz Rural District (Note: Renamed Malin Rural District) of the former Bakharz District in Taybad County. The following census in 2011 counted 3,969 people in 1,095 households, by which time the district had been separated from the county in the establishment of Bakharz County. The rural district was transferred to the new Central District and renamed Malin Rural District. Arzaneh was transferred to Dasht-e Arzaneh Rural District created in the same district. The 2016 census measured the population of the village as 4,241 people in 1,291 households, the most populous in its rural district.
