= Sonqorabad, Razavi Khorasan =

Village in Razavi Khorasan province, Iran

Sonqorabad Persian: سنقراباد
- Village
- Location within Iran
- Coordinates: 35°13′23″N 60°08′26″E
- Country: Iran
- Province: Razavi Khorasan
- County: Bakharz
- District: Bala Velayat
- Rural District: Ashtin

Population (2016)
  - Total: 1,021
- Time zone: UTC+3:30 (IRST)

Sonqorabad (Persian: سنقراباد) (Note: Also romanized as Sonqorābād) is a village in Ashtin Rural District of Bala Velayat District in Bakharz County, Razavi Khorasan province, Iran.

== Demographics ==
=== Population ===
At the time of the 2006 National Census, the village's population was 988 in 196 households, when it was in Bala Velayat Rural District of the former Bakharz District in Taybad County. The following census in 2011 counted 1,089 people in 246 households, by which time the district had been separated from the county in the establishment of Bakharz County. The rural district was transferred to the new Bala Velayat District, and the village was transferred to Ashtin Rural District created in the same district. The 2016 census measured the population of the village as 1,021 people in 229 households.
