= Baiyi =

Village in Razavi Khorasan province, Iran

Baiyi Persian: بايي
- Village
- Location within Iran
- Coordinates: 35°11′01″N 60°11′41″E
- Country: Iran
- Province: Razavi Khorasan
- County: Bakharz
- District: Bala Velayat
- Rural District: Ashtin

Population (2016)
  - Total: 419
- Time zone: UTC+3:30 (IRST)

Baiyi (Persian: بايي) (Note: Also romanized as Bā’ī and Bāīyī; also known as Bai) is a village in Ashtin Rural District of Bala Velayat District in Bakharz County, Razavi Khorasan province, Iran.

== Demographics ==
=== Population ===
At the time of the 2006 National Census, the village's population was 374 in 72 households, when it was in Bala Velayat Rural District of the former Bakharz District in Taybad County. The following census in 2011 counted 342 people in 93 households, by which time the district had been separated from the county in the establishment of Bakharz County. The rural district was transferred to the new Bala Velayat District, and the village was transferred to Ashtin Rural District created in the same district. The 2016 census measured the population of the village as 419 people in 111 households.
