= Pol-e Band =

Village in Razavi Khorasan province, Iran

Pol-e Band Persian: پل بند
- Village
- Location within Iran
- Coordinates: 34°53′41″N 60°34′27″E
- Country: Iran
- Province: Razavi Khorasan
- County: Bakharz
- District: Central
- Rural District: Malin

Population (2016)
  - Total: 2,133
- Time zone: UTC+3:30 (IRST)

Pol-e Band (Persian: پل بند) (Note: Also romanized as Pol Band; also known as Pūlband) is a village in Malin Rural District (Note: Formerly Bakharz Rural District) of the Central District of Bakharz County, Razavi Khorasan province, Iran.

== Demographics ==
=== Population ===
At the time of the 2006 National Census, the village's population was 2,092 in 440 households, when it was in Dasht-e Taybad Rural District of Miyan Velayat District in Taybad County. The following census in 2011 counted 2,203 people in 542 households, by which time the village had been separated from the county in the establishment of Bakharz County. Pol-e Band was transferred to Malin Rural District (Note: Formerly Bakharz Rural District) of the new Central District. The 2016 census measured the population of the village as 2,133 people in 575 households.
