= Ostay =

Village in Razavi Khorasan province, Iran

Ostay Persian: استاي
- Village
- Location within Iran
- Coordinates: 34°50′22″N 60°18′13″E
- Country: Iran
- Province: Razavi Khorasan
- County: Bakharz
- District: Central
- Rural District: Malin

Population (2016)
  - Total: 2,995
- Time zone: UTC+3:30 (IRST)

Ostay (Persian: استاي) (Note: Also romanized as Ostāy) is a village in Malin Rural District (Note: Formerly Bakharz Rural District) of the Central District of Bakharz County, Razavi Khorasan province, Iran.

== Demographics ==
=== Population ===
At the time of the 2006 National Census, the village's population was 2,790 in 611 households, when it was in Kuhsangi Rural District of Miyan Velayat District in Taybad County. The following census in 2011 counted 3,024 people in 755 households, by which time the village had been separated from the county in the establishment of Bakharz County. Ostay was transferred to Malin Rural District of the new Central District. The 2016 census measured the population of the village as 2,995 people in 841 households, the most populous in its rural district.
