= Kalateh-ye Kazem =

Village in Razavi Khorasan province, Iran

Kalateh-ye Kazem Persian: كلاته كاظم
- Village
- Location within Iran
- Coordinates: 35°07′54″N 60°06′33″E
- Country: Iran
- Province: Razavi Khorasan
- County: Bakharz
- District: Bala Velayat
- Rural District: Ashtin

Population (2016)
  - Total: 1,067
- Time zone: UTC+3:30 (IRST)

Kalateh-ye Kazem (Persian: كلاته كاظم) (Note: Also romanized as Kalāteh-e Kāz̧em and Kalāteh-ye Kāz̧em) is a village in Ashtin Rural District of Bala Velayat District in Bakharz County, Razavi Khorasan province, Iran.

== Demographics ==
=== Population ===
At the time of the 2006 National Census, the village's population was 816 in 164 households, when it was in Bala Velayat Rural District of the former Bakharz District in Taybad County. The following census in 2011 counted 1,020 people in 270 households, by which time the district had been separated from the county in the establishment of Bakharz County. The rural district was transferred to the new Bala Velayat District, and the village was transferred to Ashtin Rural District created in the same district. The 2016 census measured the population of the village as 1,067 people in 298 households.
