= Kafch =

Village in Razavi Khorasan province, Iran

Kafch Persian: كافچ
- Village
- Location within Iran
- Coordinates: 35°02′15″N 60°13′58″E
- Country: Iran
- Province: Razavi Khorasan
- County: Bakharz
- District: Bala Velayat
- Rural District: Bala Velayat

Population (2016)
  - Total: 618
- Time zone: UTC+3:30 (IRST)

Kafch (Persian: كافچ) (Note: Also romanized as Kāfch; also known as Gerīcheh, Kadcheh, Kāfj, and Kedcheh) is a village in Bala Velayat Rural District of Bala Velayat District in Bakharz County, Razavi Khorasan province, Iran.

== Demographics ==
=== Population ===
At the time of the 2006 National Census, the village's population was 587 in 124 households, when it was in the former Bakharz District of Taybad County. The following census in 2011 counted 597 people in 159 households, by which time the district had been separated from the county in the establishment of Bakharz County. The rural district was transferred to the new Bala Velayat District. The 2016 census measured the population of the village as 618 people in 179 households.
