= Turaneh =

Village in Razavi Khorasan province, Iran

Turaneh Persian: تورانه
- Village
- Location within Iran
- Coordinates: 35°01′18″N 60°06′20″E
- Country: Iran
- Province: Razavi Khorasan
- County: Bakharz
- District: Bala Velayat
- Rural District: Bala Velayat

Population (2016)
  - Total: 1,097
- Time zone: UTC+3:30 (IRST)

Turaneh (Persian: تورانه) (Note: Also romanized as Towrāneh and Tūrāneh) is a village in Bala Velayat Rural District of Bala Velayat District in Bakharz County, Razavi Khorasan province, Iran.

== Demographics ==
=== Population ===
At the time of the 2006 National Census, the village's population was 1,188 in 256 households, when it was in the former Bakharz District of Taybad County. The following census in 2011 counted 1,058 people in 280 households, by which time the district had been separated from the county in the establishment of Bakharz County. The rural district was transferred to the new Bala Velayat District. The 2016 census measured the population of the village as 1,097 people in 320 households.
