= Estajrud =

Village in Razavi Khorasan province, Iran

Estajrud Persian: استجرود
- Village
- Location within Iran
- Coordinates: 35°03′58″N 60°05′37″E
- Country: Iran
- Province: Razavi Khorasan
- County: Bakharz
- District: Bala Velayat
- Rural District: Bala Velayat

Population (2016)
  - Total: 758
- Time zone: UTC+3:30 (IRST)

Estajrud (Persian: استجرود) (Note: Also romanized as Estajrūd; also known as Esfahrūd) is a village in Bala Velayat Rural District of Bala Velayat District in Bakharz County, Razavi Khorasan province, Iran.

== Demographics ==
=== Population ===
At the time of the 2006 National Census, the village's population was 731 in 147 households, when it was in the former Bakharz District of Taybad County. The following census in 2011 counted 770 people in 172 households, by which time the district had been separated from the county in the establishment of Bakharz County. The rural district was transferred to the new Bala Velayat District. The 2016 census measured the population of the village as 758 people in 195 households.
