= Bezanjerd-e Eslami =

Village in Razavi Khorasan province, Iran

Bezanjerd-e Eslami Persian: بزنجرداسلامي
- Village
- Location within Iran
- Country: Iran
- Province: Razavi Khorasan
- County: Bakharz
- District: Central
- Rural District: Malin

Population (2016)
  - Total: 234
- Time zone: UTC+3:30 (IRST)

Bezanjerd-e Eslami (Persian: بزنجرداسلامي) (Note: Also romanized as Bezanjerd-e Eslāmī; also known as Bejangerd and Pezhangerd (پژنگرد)) is a village in Malin Rural District (Note: Formerly Bakharz Rural District) of the Central District of Bakharz County, Razavi Khorasan province, Iran.

== Demographics ==
=== Population ===
At the time of the 2006 National Census, the village's population was 260 in 60 households, when it was in Bakharz Rural District (Note: Renamed Malin Rural District) of the former Bakharz District in Taybad County. The following census in 2011 counted 243 people in 63 households, by which time the district had been separated from the county in the establishment of Bakharz County. The rural district was transferred to the new Central District and renamed Malin Rural District. The 2016 census measured the population of the village as 234 people in 62 households.
