= Shahrak-e Emam Khomeyni, Razavi Khorasan =

Village in Razavi Khorasan province, Iran

Shahrak-e Emam Khomeyni Persian: شهرك امام خميني
- Village
- Location within Iran
- Coordinates: 35°01′36″N 60°15′19″E
- Country: Iran
- Province: Razavi Khorasan
- County: Bakharz
- District: Central
- Rural District: Malin

Population (2016)
  - Total: 320
- Time zone: UTC+3:30 (IRST)

Shahrak-e Emam Khomeyni (Persian: شهرك امام خميني) (Note: Also romanized as Shahrak-e Emām Khomeynī) is a village in Malin Rural District (Note: Formerly Bakharz Rural District) of the Central District of Bakharz County, Razavi Khorasan province, Iran.

== Demographics ==
=== Population ===
At the time of the 2006 National Census, the village's population was 265 in 58 households, when it was in Bakharz Rural District (Note: Renamed Malin Rural District) of the former Bakharz District in Taybad County. The following census in 2011 counted 274 people in 74 households, by which time the district had been separated from the county in the establishment of Bakharz County. The rural district was transferred to the new Central District and renamed Malin Rural District. The 2016 census measured the population of the village as 320 people in 95 households.
