= Shahrak-e Shahid Doktor Beheshti =

Village in Razavi Khorasan province, Iran

Shahrak-e Shahid Doktor Beheshti Persian: شهرك شهيددكتربهشتي
- Village
- Location within Iran
- Coordinates: 35°06′04″N 60°11′06″E
- Country: Iran
- Province: Razavi Khorasan
- County: Bakharz
- District: Bala Velayat
- Rural District: Bala Velayat

Population (2016)
  - Total: 1,736
- Time zone: UTC+3:30 (IRST)

Shahrak-e Shahid Doktar Beheshti (Persian: شهرك شهيد دكتر بهشتي) (Note: Also romanized as Shahrak-e Shahid Daktar Beheshti and Shahrak-e Shahīd Daktar Beheshtī ; also known as Shahrak-e Shahīd Beheshtī and Shahran) is a village in Bala Velayat Rural District of Bala Velayat District in Bakharz County, Razavi Khorasan province, Iran.

== Demographics ==
=== Population ===
At the time of the 2006 National Census, the village's population was 1,597 in 345 households, when it was in the former Bakharz District of Taybad County. The following census in 2011 counted 1,857 people in 507 households, by which time the district had been separated from the county in the establishment of Bakharz County. The rural district was transferred to the new Bala Velayat District. The 2016 census measured the population of the village as 1,736 people in 512 households, the most populous in its rural district.
