= Qaleh Now-e Shamlu =

Village in Razavi Khorasan province, Iran

Qaleh Now-e Shamlu Persian: قلعه نوشاملو
- Village
- Location within Iran
- Coordinates: 35°00′02″N 60°19′31″E
- Country: Iran
- Province: Razavi Khorasan
- County: Bakharz
- District: Central
- Rural District: Malin

Population (2016)
  - Total: 1,236
- Time zone: UTC+3:30 (IRST)

Qaleh Now-e Shamlu (Persian: قلعه نوشاملو) (Note: Also romanized as Qal‘eh Now-e Shāmlū) is a village in Malin Rural District (Note: Formerly Bakharz Rural District) of the Central District of Bakharz County, Razavi Khorasan province, Iran.

== Demographics ==
=== Population ===
At the time of the 2006 National Census, the village's population was 646 in 131 households, when it was in Bakharz Rural District (Note: Renamed Malin Rural District) of the former Bakharz District in Taybad County. The following census in 2011 counted 1,007 people in 252 households, by which time the district had been separated from the county in the establishment of Bakharz County. The rural district was transferred to the new Central District and renamed Malin Rural District. The 2016 census measured the population of the village as 1,236 people in 339 households.
