= Mohammadabad, Bakharz =

Village in Razavi Khorasan province, Iran

Mohammadabad Persian: محمداباد
- Village
- Province: Razavi Khorasan
- County: Bakharz
- District: Bala Velayat
- Rural District: Bala Velayat

Population (2016)
  - Total: 0
- Time zone: UTC+3:30 (IRST)

Mohammadabad (Persian: محمداباد) (Note: Also romanized as Moḩammadābād) is a village in Bala Velayat Rural District of Bala Velayat District in Bakharz County, Razavi Khorasan province, Iran.

== Demographics ==
=== Population ===
At the time of the 2006 National Census, the village's population was 59 in 15 households, when it was in the former Bakharz District of Taybad County. The village did not appear in the following census of 2011, by which time the district had been separated from the county in the establishment of Bakharz County. The rural district was transferred to the new Bala Velayat District. The 2016 census measured the population of the village as zero.
