= Tangal-e Mazar =

Village in Razavi Khorasan province, Iran

Tangal-e Mazar Persian: تنگل مزار
- Village
- Location within Iran
- Coordinates: 35°01′59″N 60°02′58″E
- Country: Iran
- Province: Razavi Khorasan
- County: Bakharz
- District: Bala Velayat
- Rural District: Bala Velayat

Population (2016)
  - Total: 590
- Time zone: UTC+3:30 (IRST)

Tangal-e Mazar (Persian: تنگل مزار) (Note: Also romanized as Tangal Mazār and Tangal-e Mazār) is a village in Bala Velayat Rural District of Bala Velayat District in Bakharz County, Razavi Khorasan province, Iran.

== Demographics ==
=== Population ===
At the time of the 2006 National Census, the village's population was 469 in 85 households, when it was in the former Bakharz District of Taybad County. The following census in 2011 counted 576 people in 144 households, by which time the district had been separated from the county in the establishment of Bakharz County. The rural district was transferred to the new Bala Velayat District. The 2016 census measured the population of the village as 590 people in 157 households.
