= Gorazi =

Gorazi (Persian: گرازي) may refer to:

- Gorazi, Fars
- Gorazi, Kerman
- Gorazi, Bakharz, Razavi Khorasan Province
- Gorazi, Khvaf, Razavi Khorasan Province
