= Kordian (disambiguation) =

Kordian is a drama.

Kordian (Persian: كرديان) may also refer to:

- Kordian, Fars, Iran
- Kordian, Razavi Khorasan, Iran
- Kordeyan, Tehran, Iran
- Kordian District, in Fars Province, Iran
