= Qaleh Now-e Olya =

Village in Razavi Khorasan province, Iran

Qaleh Now-e Olya Persian: قلعه نو عليا
- Village
- Location within Iran
- Coordinates: 35°05′52″N 60°09′33″E
- Country: Iran
- Province: Razavi Khorasan
- County: Bakharz
- District: Bala Velayat
- Rural District: Bala Velayat

Population (2016)
  - Total: 1,620
- Time zone: UTC+3:30 (IRST)

Qaleh Now-e Olya (Persian: قلعه نوعليا) (Note: Also romanized as Qal‘eh Now-e ‘Olyā, Qal’eh Now-Ye-’Olyā, Qal‘eh-ye Now ‘Ōlyā, and Qal‘eh-ye Now-ye ‘Olyā; also known as Qal‘eh Now, Qal‘eh Now-e Bālā, Qal‘eh-i-Nau, Qal‘eh-ye Now, and Qal‘eh-ye Now Bālā) is a village in Bala Velayat Rural District of Bala Velayat District in Bakharz County, Razavi Khorasan province, Iran, serving as capital of both the district and the rural district.

== Demographics ==
=== Population ===
At the time of the 2006 National Census, the village's population was 1,892 in 450 households, when it was in the former Bakharz District of Taybad County. The following census in 2011 counted 1,832 people in 476 households, by which time the district had been separated from the county in the establishment of Bakharz County. The rural district was transferred to the new Bala Velayat District. The 2016 census measured the population of the village as 1,620 people in 494 households.
