= Kalateh-ye Khuni, Bakharz =

Village in Razavi Khorasan province, Iran

Kalateh-ye Khuni Persian: كلاته خوني
- Village
- Location within Iran
- Coordinates: 34°58′44″N 60°20′58″E
- Country: Iran
- Province: Razavi Khorasan
- County: Bakharz
- District: Central
- Rural District: Malin

Population (2016)
  - Total: 348
- Time zone: UTC+3:30 (IRST)

Kalateh-ye Khuni (Persian: كلاته خوني) (Note: Also romanized as Kalāteh Khūnī and Kalāteh-ye Khūnī) is a village in Malin Rural District (Note: Formerly Bakharz Rural District) of the Central District of Bakharz County, Razavi Khorasan province, Iran.

== Demographics ==
=== Population ===
At the time of the 2006 National Census, the village's population was 253 in 58 households, when it was in Bakharz Rural District (Note: Renamed Malin Rural District) of the former Bakharz District in Taybad County. The following census in 2011 counted 283 people in 78 households, by which time the district had been separated from the county in the establishment of Bakharz County. The rural district was transferred to the new Central District and renamed Malin Rural District. The 2016 census measured the population of the village as 348 people in 100 households.
