= Kordeyan =

Kordeyan or Kordiyan (Persian: كرديان) may refer to:

- Kordiyan, Fars
- Kordiyan, Hamadan
- Kordeyan, Razavi Khorasan
- Kordeyan, Tehran
- Kordeyan District, in Fars Province
