= Kordian, Razavi Khorasan =

Village in Razavi Khorasan province, Iran

Kordian Persian: كرديان
- Village
- Location within Iran
- Coordinates: 34°56′33″N 60°13′16″E
- Country: Iran
- Province: Razavi Khorasan
- County: Bakharz
- District: Central
- Rural District: Dasht-e Arzaneh

Population (2016)
  - Total: 2,487
- Time zone: UTC+3:30 (IRST)

Kordian (Persian: كرديان) (Note: Also romanized as Kordeyān, Kordīān, and Kordīyān) is a village in Dasht-e Arzaneh Rural District of the Central District in Bakharz County, Razavi Khorasan province, Iran.

== Demographics ==
=== Population ===
At the time of the 2006 National Census, the village's population was 1,870 in 436 households, when it was in Bakharz Rural District (Note: Renamed Malin Rural District) of the former Bakharz District in Taybad County. The following census in 2011 counted 2,690 people in 763 households, by which time the district had been separated from the county in the establishment of Bakharz County. The rural district was transferred to the new Central District and renamed Malin Rural District. Kordian was transferred to Dasht-e Arzaneh Rural District created in the same district. The 2016 census measured the population of the village as 2,487 people in 778 households.
