= Iileh =

Village in Razavi Khorasan province, Iran

Iileh Persian: ايله
- Village
- Location within Iran
- Coordinates: 34°40′27″N 60°24′40″E
- Country: Iran
- Province: Razavi Khorasan
- County: Taybad
- District: Central
- Rural District: Karat

Population (2016)
  - Total: 271
- Time zone: UTC+3:30 (IRST)

Iileh (Persian: ايله) (Note: Also romanized as Iīleh) is a village in Karat Rural District of the Central District in Taybad County, Razavi Khorasan province, Iran.

== Demographics ==
=== Population ===
At the time of the 2006 National Census, the village's population was 167 in 37 households. The following census in 2011 counted 194 people in 54 households. The 2016 census measured the population of the village as 271 people in 77 households.
