= Jowzeqan =

Village in Razavi Khorasan province, Iran

Jowzeqan Persian: جوزقان
- Village
- Location within Iran
- Coordinates: 34°46′11″N 60°27′55″E
- Country: Iran
- Province: Razavi Khorasan
- County: Taybad
- District: Miyan Velayat
- Rural District: Kuhsangi

Population (2016)
  - Total: 2,121
- Time zone: UTC+3:30 (IRST)

Jowzeqan (Persian: جوزقان) (Note: Also romanized as Jowzeqān and Jowzqān) is a village in Kuhsangi Rural District of Miyan Velayat District in Taybad County, Razavi Khorasan province, Iran.

== Demographics ==
=== Population ===
At the time of the 2006 National Census, the village's population was 1,833 in 423 households. The following census in 2011 counted 2,049 people in 560 households. The 2016 census measured the population of the village as 2,121 people in 567 households, the most populous in its rural district.
