= Ferezneh =

Village in Razavi Khorasan province, Iran

Ferezneh Persian: فرزنه
- Village
- Location within Iran
- Coordinates: 34°30′45″N 60°36′50″E
- Country: Iran
- Province: Razavi Khorasan
- County: Taybad
- District: Central
- Rural District: Karat

Population (2016)
  - Total: 1,531
- Time zone: UTC+3:30 (IRST)

Ferezneh (Persian: فرزنه) (Note: Also romanized as Farazneh, Farezneh, and Farzaneh; also known as Borj-e Farīzneh, Farīzna, and Farīzneh) is a village in Karat Rural District of the Central District in Taybad County, Razavi Khorasan province, Iran.

== Demographics ==
=== Population ===
At the time of the 2006 National Census, the village's population was 1,280 in 273 households. The following census in 2011 counted 1,447 people in 361 households. The 2016 census measured the population of the village as 1,531 people in 426 households.
