= Rahneh =

Village in Razavi Khorasan province, Iran

Rahneh Persian: رهنه
- Village
- Location within Iran
- Coordinates: 34°33′06″N 60°33′57″E
- Country: Iran
- Province: Razavi Khorasan
- County: Taybad
- District: Central
- Rural District: Karat

Population (2016)
  - Total: 1,968
- Time zone: UTC+3:30 (IRST)

Rahneh (Persian: رهنه) (Note: Also romanized as Rahaneh) is a village in Karat Rural District of the Central District in Taybad County, Razavi Khorasan province, Iran.

== Demographics ==
=== Population ===
At the time of the 2006 National Census, the village's population was 1,795 in 347 households. The following census in 2011 counted 1,940 people in 466 households. The 2016 census measured the population of the village as 1,968 people in 517 households.
