= Sorkh Sara =

Village in Razavi Khorasan province, Iran

Sorkh Sara Persian: سرخ سرا
- Village
- Location within Iran
- Coordinates: 34°49′37″N 60°27′55″E
- Country: Iran
- Province: Razavi Khorasan
- County: Taybad
- District: Miyan Velayat
- Rural District: Dasht-e Taybad

Population (2016)
  - Total: 392
- Time zone: UTC+3:30 (IRST)

Sorkh Sara (Persian: سرخ سرا) (Note: Also romanized as Sorkh Sarā; also known as Sorkh Sarāy (سرخ سرائ)) is a village in Dasht-e Taybad Rural District (Note: Formerly Miyan Velayat Rural District) of Miyan Velayat District in Taybad County, Razavi Khorasan province, Iran.

== Demographics ==
=== Population ===
At the time of the 2006 National Census, the village's population was 258 in 51 households. The following census in 2011 counted 339 people in 88 households. The 2016 census measured the population of the village as 392 people in 107 households.
