= Owlya =

Village in Razavi Khorasan province, Iran

Owlya Persian: اوليا
- Village
- Location within Iran
- Coordinates: 35°01′23″N 60°40′51″E
- Country: Iran
- Province: Razavi Khorasan
- County: Taybad
- District: Central
- Rural District: Pain Velayat

Population (2016)
  - Total: 0
- Time zone: UTC+3:30 (IRST)

Owlya (Persian: اوليا) (Note: Also romanized as Owlyā’) is a village in Pain Velayat Rural District of the Central District in Taybad County, Razavi Khorasan province, Iran.

== Demographics ==
=== Population ===
At the time of the 2006 National Census, the village's population was 18 in five households. The village did not appear in the following census of 2011. The 2016 census measured the population of the village as zero.
