= Shadi, Taybad =

Village in Razavi Khorasan province, Iran

Shadi Persian: شادي
- Village
- Location within Iran
- Coordinates: 34°50′54″N 60°25′25″E
- Country: Iran
- Province: Razavi Khorasan
- County: Taybad
- District: Miyan Velayat
- Rural District: Dasht-e Taybad

Population (2016)
  - Total: 0
- Time zone: UTC+3:30 (IRST)

Shadi (Persian: شادي) (Note: Also romanized as Shādī; also known as Shād) is a village in Dasht-e Taybad Rural District (Note: Formerly Miyan Velayat Rural District) of Miyan Velayat District in Taybad County, Razavi Khorasan province, Iran.

== Demographics ==
=== Population ===
At the time of the 2006 National Census, the village's population was 64 in 20 households. The following census in 2011 counted 107 people in 28 households. The 2016 census measured the population of the village as zero.
