= Karat Minaret =

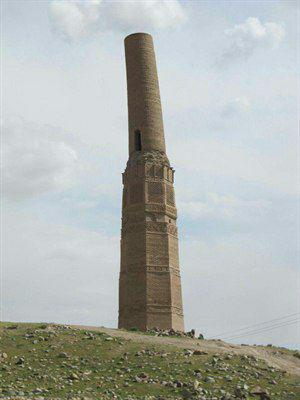
- میل کرات

- Location within Iran

Religion
- Province: Khorasan-e Razavi Province

Location
- Location: Khorasan-e Razavi Province, Taybad, Iran
- Municipality: Taybad

Architecture
- Type: Minaret
- Style: Seljuq dynasty
- Iran National Heritage List
- Official name: Karat Minaret
- Type: Minaret
- Designated: 1932
- Reference no.: 123
- Conservation organization: Cultural Heritage, Handicrafts and Tourism Organization of Iran

Karat Minaret (Persian: میل کرات) a minaret and is about 25 km south of Taybad, Iran, in the village with the same name. It was built in Seljuk period.
