= Bala Velayat =

Bala Velayat (Persian: بالا ولایت) may refer to:

- Bala Velayat District
- Bala Velayat Rural District (disambiguation)
