= Sefid Bala =

Village in Razavi Khorasan province, Iran

Sefid Bala Persian: سفيدبالا
- Village
- Location within Iran
- Coordinates: 34°45′04″N 60°49′00″E
- Country: Iran
- Province: Razavi Khorasan
- County: Taybad
- District: Central
- Rural District: Pain Velayat

Population (2016)
  - Total: 13
- Time zone: UTC+3:30 (IRST)

Sefid Bala (Persian: سفيدبالا) (Note: Also romanized as Sefīd Bālā; also known as Sefīd Bālā-ye Pā’īn) is a village in Pain Velayat Rural District of the Central District in Taybad County, Razavi Khorasan province, Iran.

== Demographics ==
=== Population ===
At the time of the 2006 National Census, the village's population was 14 in four households. The village did not appear in the following census of 2011. The 2016 census measured the population of the village as 13 people in four households.
