= Kuhabad =

Village in Razavi Khorasan province, Iran

Kuhabad Persian: كوه اباد
- Village
- Location within Iran
- Coordinates: 34°36′10″N 60°30′08″E
- Country: Iran
- Province: Razavi Khorasan
- County: Taybad
- District: Central
- Rural District: Karat

Population (2016)
  - Total: 1,043
- Time zone: UTC+3:30 (IRST)

Kuhabad (Persian: كوه اباد) (Note: Also romanized as Kūhābād) is a village in Karat Rural District of the Central District in Taybad County, Razavi Khorasan province, Iran.

== Demographics ==
=== Population ===
At the time of the 2006 National Census, the village's population was 852 in 158 households. The following census in 2011 counted 964 people in 219 households. The 2016 census measured the population of the village as 1,043 people in 266 households.
