= Samangan, Taybad =

Village in Razavi Khorasan province, Iran

Samangan Persian: سمنگان
- Village
- Location within Iran
- Coordinates: 34°50′38″N 60°27′19″E
- Country: Iran
- Province: Razavi Khorasan
- County: Taybad
- District: Miyan Velayat
- Rural District: Dasht-e Taybad

Population (2016)
  - Total: 850
- Time zone: UTC+3:30 (IRST)

Samangan (Persian: سمنگان) (Note: Also romanized as Samangān) is a village in Dasht-e Taybad Rural District (Note: Formerly Miyan Velayat Rural District) of Miyan Velayat District in Taybad County, Razavi Khorasan province, Iran.

== Demographics ==
=== Population ===
At the time of the 2006 National Census, the village's population was 683 in 126 households. The following census in 2011 counted 797 people in 200 households. The 2016 census measured the population of the village as 850 people in 215 households.
