= Hoseyni, Taybad =

Village in Razavi Khorasan province, Iran

Hoseyni Persian: حسيني
- Village
- Location within Iran
- Coordinates: 34°46′47″N 60°25′41″E
- Country: Iran
- Province: Razavi Khorasan
- County: Taybad
- District: Miyan Velayat
- Rural District: Kuhsangi

Population (2016)
  - Total: 755
- Time zone: UTC+3:30 (IRST)

Hoseyni (Persian: حسيني) (Note: Also romanized as Hoseini and Ḩoseynī) is a village in, and the capital of, Kuhsangi Rural District in Miyan Velayat District of Taybad County, Razavi Khorasan province, Iran.

== Demographics ==
=== Population ===
At the time of the 2006 National Census, the village's population was 726 in 174 households. The following census in 2011 counted 733 people in 201 households. The 2016 census measured the population of the village as 755 people in 192 households.
