= Chahar Borji =

Village in Razavi Khorasan province, Iran

Chahar Borji Persian: چهاربرجي
- Village
- Location within Iran
- Coordinates: 34°45′12″N 60°36′58″E
- Country: Iran
- Province: Razavi Khorasan
- County: Taybad
- District: Miyan Velayat
- Rural District: Dasht-e Taybad

Population (2016)
  - Total: 1,844
- Time zone: UTC+3:30 (IRST)

Chahar Borji (Persian: چهاربرجي) (Note: Also romanized as Chahār Borjī) is a village in Dasht-e Taybad Rural District (Note: Formerly Miyan Velayat Rural District) of Miyan Velayat District in Taybad County, Razavi Khorasan province, Iran.

== Demographics ==
=== Population ===
At the time of the 2006 National Census, the village's population was 1,413 in 292 households. The following census in 2011 counted 1,615 people in 437 households. The 2016 census measured the population of the village as 1,844 people in 480 households.
