= Ab Neyeh =

Village in Razavi Khorasan province, Iran

Ab Neyeh Persian: ابنيه
- Village
- Location within Iran
- Coordinates: 35°03′18″N 60°09′50″E
- Country: Iran
- Province: Razavi Khorasan
- County: Bakharz
- District: Bala Velayat
- Rural District: Bala Velayat

Population (2016)
  - Total: 1,301
- Time zone: UTC+3:30 (IRST)

Ab Neyeh (Persian: ابنيه) (Note: Also romanized as Āb Neyeh, Āb Neyh, and Āb Nīyeh; also known as Ābīān, Avban, and Āvyān) is a village in Bala Velayat Rural District of Bala Velayat District in Bakharz County, Razavi Khorasan province, Iran.

== Demographics ==
=== Population ===
At the time of the 2006 National Census, the village's population was 1,052 in 260 households, when it was in the former Bakharz District of Taybad County. The following census in 2011 counted 1,340 people in 406 households, by which time the district had been separated from the county in the establishment of Bakharz County. The rural district was transferred to the new Bala Velayat District. The 2016 census measured the population of the village as 1,301 people in 417 households.
