= Kalateh-ye Khuni =

Kalateh-ye Khuni and Kalateh Khuni (Persian: كلاته خوني) may refer to:

- Kalateh-ye Khuni, Bakharz
- Kalateh-ye Khuni, Fariman
