= Kalateh-ye Hazarat =

Village in Razavi Khorasan province, Iran

Kalateh-ye Hazarat Persian: كلاته حضرت
- Village
- Country: Iran
- Province: Razavi Khorasan
- County: Taybad
- District: Central
- Rural District: Pain Velayat

Population (2016)
  - Total: 38
- Time zone: UTC+3:30 (IRST)

Kalateh-ye Hazarat (Persian: كلاته حضرت) (Note: Also romanized as Kalāteh-ye Ḩaz̤arat) is a village in Pain Velayat Rural District of the Central District in Taybad County, Razavi Khorasan province, Iran.

== Demographics ==
=== Population ===
At the time of the 2006 National Census, the village's population was 143 in 32 households. The village did not appear in the following census of 2011. The 2016 census measured the population of the village as 38 people in 11 households.
