= Qaleh Now-e Abqah =

Village in Razavi Khorasan province, Iran

Qaleh Now-e Abqah Persian: قلعه نوآبقه
- Village
- Location within Iran
- Coordinates: 34°39′40″N 60°27′21″E
- Country: Iran
- Province: Razavi Khorasan
- County: Taybad
- District: Central
- Rural District: Karat

Population (2016)
  - Total: 790
- Time zone: UTC+3:30 (IRST)

Qaleh Now-e Abqah (Persian: قلعه نوآبقه) (Note: Also romanized as Qal‘eh Now-e Ābqah; formerly known as Qaleh Now-e Abgheh (قلعه نوابغه), also romanized as Qal‘eh Now-e Ābgheh; also known as Ābgheh (ابغه) and Qal‘eh-ye Now) is a village in Karat Rural District of the Central District in Taybad County, Razavi Khorasan province, Iran.

== Demographics ==
=== Population ===
At the time of the 2006 National Census, the village's population, as Qaleh Now-e Abgheh, was 666 in 136 households. The following census in 2011 counted 868 people in 176 households. The 2016 census measured the population of the village as 790 people in 217 households, by which time the village was listed as Qaleh Now-e Abqah.
