= Kahjah =

Village in Razavi Khorasan province, Iran

Kahjah Persian: كهجه
- Village
- Location within Iran
- Coordinates: 34°46′05″N 60°23′00″E
- Country: Iran
- Province: Razavi Khorasan
- County: Taybad
- District: Miyan Velayat
- Rural District: Kuhsangi

Population (2016)
  - Total: 776
- Time zone: UTC+3:30 (IRST)

Kahjah (Persian: كهجه) (Note: Also known as Kajah) is a village in Kuhsangi Rural District of Miyan Velayat District in Taybad County, Razavi Khorasan province, Iran.

== Demographics ==
=== Population ===
At the time of the 2006 National Census, the village's population was 672 in 145 households. The following census in 2011 counted 723 people in 162 households. The 2016 census measured the population of the village as 776 people in 178 households.
