= Dasht-e Arzaneh Rural District =

Rural district in Razavi Khorasan province, Iran

Dasht-e Arzaneh Rural District Persian: دهستان دشت ارزنه
- Rural District
- Location within Iran
- Coordinates: 34°57′N 60°13′E
- Country: Iran
- Province: Razavi Khorasan
- County: Bakharz
- District: Central
- Established: 2010
- Capital: Arzaneh

Population (2016)
  - Total: 8,750
- Time zone: UTC+3:30 (IRST)

Dasht-e Arzaneh Rural District (Persian: دهستان دشت ارزنه) is in the Central District of Bakharz County, Razavi Khorasan province, Iran. Its capital is the village of Arzaneh.

== History ==
In 2010, Bakharz District was separated from Taybad County in the establishment of Bakharz County, and Dasht-e Arzaneh Rural District was created in the new Central District.

== Demographics ==
=== Population ===
At the time of the 2011 National Census, the rural district's population was 8,666 in 2,431 households. The 2016 census measured the population of the rural district as 8,750 in 2,661 households. The most populous of its five villages was Arzaneh, with 4,241 people.

=== Other villages in the rural district ===
- Arkhud
- Bezanjerd-e Kordian
- Kheydiz
- Kordian
