= Arzancheh-ye Sofla =

Village in Razavi Khorasan province, Iran

Arzancheh-ye Sofla Persian: ارزنچه سفلي
- Village
- Location within Iran
- Coordinates: 34°49′35″N 60°49′33″E
- Country: Iran
- Province: Razavi Khorasan
- County: Taybad
- District: Central
- Rural District: Pain Velayat

Population (2016)
  - Total: 1,368
- Time zone: UTC+3:30 (IRST)

Arzancheh-ye Sofla (Persian: ارزنچه سفلي) (Note: Also romanized as Arzancheh-ye Soflá; also known as Arzancheh-ye Pā’īn and Arzanjeh-ye Pā’īn) is a village in Pain Velayat Rural District of the Central District in Taybad County, Razavi Khorasan province, Iran.

== Demographics ==
=== Population ===
At the time of the 2006 National Census, the village's population was 1,162 in 258 households. The following census in 2011 counted 848 people in 200 households. The 2016 census measured the population of the village as 1,368 people in 330 households, the most populous in its rural district.
