= Ashtin Rural District =

Rural district in Razavi Khorasan province, Iran

Ashtin Rural District Persian: دهستان اشتین
- Rural District
- Location within Iran
- Coordinates: 35°12′N 60°11′E
- Country: Iran
- Province: Razavi Khorasan
- County: Bakharz
- District: Bala Velayat
- Established: 2010
- Capital: Hemmatabad

Population (2016)
  - Total: 7,677
- Time zone: UTC+3:30 (IRST)

Ashtin Rural District (Persian: دهستان اشتین) is in Bala Velayat District of Bakharz County, Razavi Khorasan province, Iran. Its capital is the village of Hemmatabad.

== History ==
In 2010, Bakharz District was separated from Taybad County in the establishment of Bakharz County, and Ashtin Rural District was created in the new Bala Velayat District.

== Demographics ==
=== Population ===
At the time of the 2011 National Census, the rural district's population was 7,388 in 1,905 households. The 2016 census measured the population of the rural district as 7,677 in 2,103 households. The most populous of its 15 villages was Hemmatabad, with 1,673 people.

=== Other villages in the rural district ===
- Baiyi
- Deh-e Borzu
- Deh-e Now
- Fariabad
- Haft Suyi
- Kalateh-ye Kazem
- Qaleh Sorkh
- Sonqorabad
- Sowrastan
