= Mir Aqa Beyk =

Village in Razavi Khorasan province, Iran

Mir Aqa Beyk Persian: ميراقابيك
- Village
- Location within Iran
- Coordinates: 34°54′09″N 60°54′53″E
- Country: Iran
- Province: Razavi Khorasan
- County: Taybad
- District: Central
- Rural District: Pain Velayat

Population (2016)
  - Total: 108
- Time zone: UTC+3:30 (IRST)

Mir Aqa Beyk (Persian: ميراقابيك) (Note: Also romanized as Mīr Āqā Beyk; also known as Āqā Beyg, Āqā Beyk, and Mīr Āqā Beyg) is a village in Pain Velayat Rural District of the Central District in Taybad County, Razavi Khorasan province, Iran.

== Demographics ==
=== Population ===
At the time of the 2006 National Census, the village's population was 430 in 87 households. The following census in 2011 counted 269 people in 53 households. The 2016 census measured the population of the village as 108 people in 29 households.
