= Feyzabad, Taybad =

Village in Razavi Khorasan province, Iran

Feyzabad Persian: فيض اباد
- Village
- Location within Iran
- Coordinates: 34°45′47″N 60°49′56″E
- Country: Iran
- Province: Razavi Khorasan
- County: Taybad
- District: Central
- Rural District: Pain Velayat

Population (2016)
  - Total: 260
- Time zone: UTC+3:30 (IRST)

Feyzabad (Persian: فيض اباد) (Note: Also romanized as Feyẕābād) is a village in Pain Velayat Rural District of the Central District in Taybad County, Razavi Khorasan province, Iran.

== Demographics ==
=== Population ===
At the time of the 2006 National Census, the village's population was 199 in 41 households. The following census in 2011 counted 234 people in 58 households. The 2016 census measured the population of the village as 260 people in 75 households.
