= Khiaban =

Village in Razavi Khorasan province, Iran

Khiaban Persian: خيابان
- Village
- Location within Iran
- Coordinates: 34°44′19″N 60°34′51″E
- Country: Iran
- Province: Razavi Khorasan
- County: Taybad
- District: Miyan Velayat
- Rural District: Dasht-e Taybad

Population (2016)
  - Total: 566
- Time zone: UTC+3:30 (IRST)

Khiaban (Persian: خيابان) (Note: Also romanized as Kheyābān and Khīābān) is a village in Dasht-e Taybad Rural District (Note: Formerly Miyan Velayat Rural District) of Miyan Velayat District in Taybad County, Razavi Khorasan province, Iran.

== Demographics ==
=== Population ===
At the time of the 2006 National Census, the village's population was 395 in 101 households. The following census in 2011 counted 479 people in 133 households. The 2016 census measured the population of the village as 566 people in 159 households.
