= Kheyrabad, Taybad =

Village in Razavi Khorasan province, Iran

Kheyrabad Persian: خيرآباد
- Village
- Location within Iran
- Coordinates: 34°49′35″N 60°41′24″E
- Country: Iran
- Province: Razavi Khorasan
- County: Taybad
- District: Miyan Velayat
- Rural District: Dasht-e Taybad

Population (2016)
  - Total: 4,540
- Time zone: UTC+3:30 (IRST)

Kheyrabad (Persian: خيرآباد) (Note: Also romanized as Kheyrābād; also known as Chāh-e Ḩājj ʿAbdāl Ghafūr Rajab ʿAlīzād (چاه حاج عبدالغفوررجب عليزاد)) is a village in Dasht-e Taybad Rural District (Note: Formerly Miyan Velayat Rural District) of Miyan Velayat District in Taybad County, Razavi Khorasan province, Iran.

== Demographics ==
=== Population ===
At the time of the 2006 National Census, the village's population was 2,728 in 551 households. The following census in 2011 counted 3,954 people in 882 households. The 2016 census measured the population of the village as 4,540 people in 994 households, the most populous in its rural district.
