= Farmanabad, Razavi Khorasan =

Village in Razavi Khorasan province, Iran

Farmanabad Persian: فرمان اباد
- Village
- Location within Iran
- Coordinates: 34°42′42″N 60°46′00″E
- Country: Iran
- Province: Razavi Khorasan
- County: Taybad
- District: Central
- Rural District: Karat

Population (2016)
  - Total: 2,969
- Time zone: UTC+3:30 (IRST)

Farmanabad (Persian: فرمان اباد) (Note: Also romanized as Farmānābād) is a village in Karat Rural District of the Central District in Taybad County, Razavi Khorasan province, Iran.

== Demographics ==
=== Population ===
At the time of the 2006 National Census, the village's population was 2,071 in 432 households. The following census in 2011 counted 2,490 people in 597 households. The 2016 census measured the population of the village as 2,969 people in 739 households.
