= Shizan =

Village in Razavi Khorasan province, Iran

Shizan Persian: شيزن
- Village
- Location within Iran
- Coordinates: 34°44′16″N 60°20′37″E
- Country: Iran
- Province: Razavi Khorasan
- County: Taybad
- District: Miyan Velayat
- Rural District: Kuhsangi

Population (2016)
  - Total: 683
- Time zone: UTC+3:30 (IRST)

Shizan (Persian: شيزن) (Note: Also romanized as Shīzan) is a village in Kuhsangi Rural District of Miyan Velayat District in Taybad County, Razavi Khorasan province, Iran.

== Demographics ==
=== Population ===
At the time of the 2006 National Census, the village's population was 503 in 103 households. The following census in 2011 counted 455 people in 95 households. The 2016 census measured the population of the village as 683 people in 165 households.
