= Abqah =

Village in Razavi Khorasan province, Iran

Abqah Persian: ابقه
- Village
- Location within Iran
- Coordinates: 34°39′36″N 60°26′54″E
- Country: Iran
- Province: Razavi Khorasan
- County: Taybad
- District: Central
- Rural District: Karat

Population (2016)
  - Total: 2,687
- Time zone: UTC+3:30 (IRST)

Abqah (Persian: ابقه) (Note: Also romanized as Āb Qeh and Ābqah; also known as Ābgheh, Āgha, and Aqah) is a village in Karat Rural District of the Central District in Taybad County, Razavi Khorasan province, Iran.

== Demographics ==
=== Population ===
At the time of the 2006 National Census, the village's population was 2,029 in 391 households. The following census in 2011 counted 3,046 people in 765 households. The 2016 census measured the population of the village as 2,687 people in 689 households.
