= Qumi =

Village in Razavi Khorasan province, Iran

Qumi Persian: قومي
- Village
- Location within Iran
- Coordinates: 34°44′34″N 60°49′55″E
- Country: Iran
- Province: Razavi Khorasan
- County: Taybad
- District: Central
- Rural District: Pain Velayat

Population (2016)
  - Total: 503
- Time zone: UTC+3:30 (IRST)

Qumi (Persian: قومي) (Note: Also romanized as Qūmī) is a village in Pain Velayat Rural District of the Central District in Taybad County, Razavi Khorasan province, Iran.

== Demographics ==
=== Population ===
At the time of the 2006 National Census, the village's population was 104 in 26 households. The following census in 2011 counted 159 people in 44 households. The 2016 census measured the population of the village as 503 people in 136 households.
