= Bidak, Taybad =

Village in Razavi Khorasan province, Iran

Bidak Persian: بيدك
- Village
- Location within Iran
- Coordinates: 34°50′19″N 60°25′13″E
- Country: Iran
- Province: Razavi Khorasan
- County: Taybad
- District: Miyan Velayat
- Rural District: Dasht-e Taybad

Population (2016)
  - Total: 57
- Time zone: UTC+3:30 (IRST)

Bidak (Persian: بيدك) (Note: Also romanized as Bīdak) is a village in Dasht-e Taybad Rural District (Note: Formerly Miyan Velayat Rural District) of Miyan Velayat District in Taybad County, Razavi Khorasan province, Iran.

== Demographics ==
=== Population ===
At the time of the 2006 National Census, the village's population was 82 in 23 households. The following census in 2011 counted 93 people in 29 households. The 2016 census measured the population of the village as 57 people in 17 households.
