= Sardab, Razavi Khorasan =

Village in Razavi Khorasan province, Iran

Sardab Persian: سرداب
- Village
- Location within Iran
- Coordinates: 34°50′55″N 60°46′21″E
- Country: Iran
- Province: Razavi Khorasan
- County: Taybad
- District: Central
- Rural District: Pain Velayat

Population (2016)
  - Total: 214
- Time zone: UTC+3:30 (IRST)

Sardab (Persian: سرداب) (Note: Also romanized as Sardāb) is a village in Pain Velayat Rural District of the Central District in Taybad County, Razavi Khorasan province, Iran.

== Demographics ==
=== Population ===
At the time of the 2006 National Census, the village's population was 296 in 59 households. The following census in 2011 counted 603 people in 124 households. The 2016 census measured the population of the village as 214 people in 48 households.
