= Suran, Taybad =

Village in Razavi Khorasan province, Iran

Suran Persian: سوران
- Village
- Location within Iran
- Coordinates: 34°48′55″N 60°20′42″E
- Country: Iran
- Province: Razavi Khorasan
- County: Taybad
- District: Miyan Velayat
- Rural District: Kuhsangi

Population (2016)
  - Total: 1,426
- Time zone: UTC+3:30 (IRST)

Suran (Persian: سوران) (Note: Also romanized as Sūrān) is a village in Kuhsangi Rural District of Miyan Velayat District in Taybad County, Razavi Khorasan province, Iran.

== Demographics ==
=== Population ===
At the time of the 2006 National Census, the village's population was 1,090 in 242 households. The following census in 2011 counted 1,305 people in 326 households. The 2016 census measured the population of the village as 1,426 people in 379 households.
