= Mohsenabad, Taybad =

Village in Razavi Khorasan province, Iran

Mohsenabad Persian: محسن اباد
- Village
- Location within Iran
- Coordinates: 34°54′13″N 60°48′54″E
- Country: Iran
- Province: Razavi Khorasan
- County: Taybad
- District: Central
- Rural District: Pain Velayat

Population (2016)
  - Total: 1,171
- Time zone: UTC+3:30 (IRST)

Mohsenabad (Persian: محسن اباد) (Note: Also romanized as Moḩsenābād; also known as Mohsīnābād and Mūhsīnabād) is a village in Pain Velayat Rural District of the Central District in Taybad County, Razavi Khorasan province, Iran.

== Demographics ==
=== Population ===
At the time of the 2006 National Census, the village's population was 861 in 167 households. The following census in 2011 counted 1,000 people in 228 households. The 2016 census measured the population of the village as 1,171 people in 324 households.
