= Koshgak =

Village in Razavi Khorasan province, Iran

Koshgak Persian: كشگك
- Village
- Location within Iran
- Coordinates: 34°55′25″N 60°43′10″E
- Country: Iran
- Province: Razavi Khorasan
- County: Taybad
- District: Central
- Rural District: Pain Velayat

Population (2016)
  - Total: 597
- Time zone: UTC+3:30 (IRST)

Koshgak (Persian: كشگك) (Note: Also known as Koshkak) is a village in Pain Velayat Rural District of the Central District in Taybad County, Razavi Khorasan province, Iran.

== Demographics ==
=== Population ===
At the time of the 2006 National Census, the village's population was 576 in 131 households. The following census in 2011 counted 581 people in 120 households. The 2016 census measured the population of the village as 597 people in 154 households.
