= Asadabad-e Darband =

Village in Razavi Khorasan province, Iran

Asadabad-e Darband Persian: اسداباددربند
- Village
- Location within Iran
- Coordinates: 34°40′40″N 60°46′20″E
- Country: Iran
- Province: Razavi Khorasan
- County: Taybad
- District: Central
- Rural District: Karat

Population (2016)
  - Total: 2,646
- Time zone: UTC+3:30 (IRST)

Asadabad-e Darband (Persian: اسداباددربند) (Note: Also romanized as Asadābād-e Darband; also known as Asadābād and Darband (دربند)) is a village in Karat Rural District of the Central District in Taybad County, Razavi Khorasan province, Iran.

== Demographics ==
=== Population ===
At the time of the 2006 National Census, the village's population was 2,057 in 429 households. The following census in 2011 counted 2,373 people in 563 households. The 2016 census measured the population of the village as 2,646 people in 653 households.
