= Kamar Sabz =

Kamar Sabz or Kamar-e Sabz (Persian: كمرسبز) may refer to:

- Kamar Sabz, Razavi Khorasan
- Kamar Sabz, South Khorasan
