= Pasaveh =

Village in Razavi Khorasan province, Iran

Pasaveh Persian: پساوه
- Village
- Location within Iran
- Coordinates: 34°42′23″N 60°30′23″E
- Country: Iran
- Province: Razavi Khorasan
- County: Taybad
- District: Miyan Velayat
- Rural District: Dasht-e Taybad

Population (2016)
  - Total: 1,098
- Time zone: UTC+3:30 (IRST)

Pasaveh (Persian: پساوه) (Note: Also romanized as Pasāveh; also known as Khvārazm and Pasāva) is a village in Dasht-e Taybad Rural District (Note: Formerly Miyan Velayat Rural District) of Miyan Velayat District in Taybad County, Razavi Khorasan province, Iran.

== Demographics ==
=== Population ===
At the time of the 2006 National Census, the village's population was 904 in 205 households. The following census in 2011 counted 974 people in 234 households. The 2016 census measured the population of the village as 1,098 people in 281 households.
