= Poshteh, Razavi Khorasan =

Village in Razavi Khorasan province, Iran

Poshteh Persian: پشته
- Village
- Location within Iran
- Coordinates: 34°42′22″N 60°22′53″E
- Country: Iran
- Province: Razavi Khorasan
- County: Taybad
- District: Central
- Rural District: Karat

Population (2016)
  - Total: 3,028
- Time zone: UTC+3:30 (IRST)

Poshteh (Persian: پشته) is a village in Karat Rural District of the Central District in Taybad County, Razavi Khorasan province, Iran.

== Demographics ==
=== Population ===
At the time of the 2006 National Census, the village's population was 2,544 in 583 households. The following census in 2011 counted 2,693 people in 657 households. The 2016 census measured the population of the village as 3,028 people in 754 households, the most populous in its rural district.
