= Kulab (disambiguation) =

Kulab is a city in the Khatlon Region of Tajikistan.

Kulab (Persian: كولاب) in Iran may refer to:

- Kulab-e Fartaq, a village in Kohgiluyeh and Boyer-Ahmad Province, Iran
- Kulab, Razavi Khorasan, a village in Razavi Khorasan Province, Iran
- Kulab, Isfahan, a village in Isfahan Province, Iran
