= Shamsabad, Taybad =

Village in Razavi Khorasan province, Iran

Shamsabad Persian: شمس اباد
- Village
- Location within Iran
- Coordinates: 34°47′31″N 60°49′57″E
- Country: Iran
- Province: Razavi Khorasan
- County: Taybad
- District: Central
- Rural District: Pain Velayat

Population (2016)
  - Total: 123
- Time zone: UTC+3:30 (IRST)

Shamsabad (Persian: شمس اباد) (Note: Also romanized as Shamsābād) is a village in Pain Velayat Rural District of the Central District in Taybad County, Razavi Khorasan province, Iran.

== Demographics ==
=== Population ===
At the time of the 2006 National Census, the village's population was 138 in 35 households. The following census in 2011 counted 31 people in seven households. The 2016 census measured the population of the village as 123 people in 29 households.
