= Abbasabad, Taybad =

Village in Razavi Khorasan province, Iran

Abbasabad Persian: عباس اباد
- Village
- Location within Iran
- Coordinates: 34°59′44″N 60°43′11″E
- Country: Iran
- Province: Razavi Khorasan
- County: Taybad
- District: Central
- Rural District: Pain Velayat

Population (2016)
  - Total: 0
- Time zone: UTC+3:30 (IRST)

Abbasabad (Persian: عباس اباد) (Note: Also romanized as ‘Abbāsābād) is a village in Pain Velayat Rural District of the Central District in Taybad County, Razavi Khorasan province, Iran.

== Demographics ==
=== Population ===
At the time of the 2006 National Census, the village's population was 67 in 13 households. The following census in 2011 counted a population below the reporting threshold. The 2016 census measured the population of the village as zero.
