= Dowqarun =

Village in Razavi Khorasan province, Iran

Dowqarun Persian: دوقارون
- Village
- Location within Iran
- Coordinates: 34°44′18″N 60°52′45″E
- Country: Iran
- Province: Razavi Khorasan
- County: Taybad
- District: Central
- Rural District: Pain Velayat

Population (2016)
  - Total: 117
- Time zone: UTC+3:30 (IRST)

Dowqarun (Persian: دوقارون) (Note: Also romanized as Doqārūn and Dowqārūn; also known as Dehqārown, Do Ghārūn, Doghāravan, and Dūghārūn) is a village in Pain Velayat Rural District of the Central District in Taybad County, Razavi Khorasan province, Iran.

== Demographics ==
=== Population ===
At the time of the 2006 National Census, the village's population was 80 in 16 households. The following census in 2011 counted 109 people in 21 households. The 2016 census measured the population of the village as 117 people in 33 households.
