= Miyan Velayat =

Miyan Velayat (Persian: ميان ولايت) may refer to:

- Miyan Velayat District
- Miyan Velayat Rural District
