= Davtyan =

Davtyan (Armenian: Դավթյան) is an Armenian surname. Notable people with the surname include:

- Artak Davtyan (general) (born 1970), Armenian Major-General, currently 7th Chief of the General Staff of the Armenian Armed Forces
- Artak Davtyan (politician) (1966–2023), Armenian economist and politician
- Artur Davtyan (born 1992), Armenian gymnast
- Eleonora Davtyan, Armenian professional footballer
- Gevorg Davtyan (born 1983), Armenian weightlifter
- Hovhannes Davtyan (disambiguation), multiple people
- Tigran Davtyan (born 1978), Armenian football midfielder
- Vahagn Davtyan (1922–1996), Armenian poet, translator, publicist and public activist
- Vahagn Davtyan (gymnast) (born 1988), Armenian gymnast

== See also ==
- Avyan (disambiguation)
