= Qaderabad, Taybad =

Village in Razavi Khorasan province, Iran

Qaderabad Persian: قادراباد
- Village
- Location within Iran
- Coordinates: 34°44′12″N 60°32′30″E
- Country: Iran
- Province: Razavi Khorasan
- County: Taybad
- District: Miyan Velayat
- Rural District: Dasht-e Taybad

Population (2016)
  - Total: 144
- Time zone: UTC+3:30 (IRST)

Qaderabad (Persian: قادراباد) (Note: Also romanized as Qāderābād; also known as Qal‘eh-ye Hendū) is a village in Dasht-e Taybad Rural District (Note: Formerly Miyan Velayat Rural District) of Miyan Velayat District in Taybad County, Razavi Khorasan province, Iran.

== Demographics ==
=== Population ===
At the time of the 2006 National Census, the village's population was 107 in 27 households. The following census in 2011 counted 122 people in 38 households. The 2016 census measured the population of the village as 144 people in 43 households.
