= Qaleh-ye Hendu =

Qaleh-ye Hendu may refer to:

- Qaleh-ye Hendu, Khvaf
- Qaleh-ye Hendu, Taybad
