= Abian =

Abian may refer to:

- Alexander Abian, mathematician
- Chen Shui-bian, former President of Taiwan
- Abian, Iran
- Abian, a person from or living in Abia State
