= Avyan =

Avyan may refer to:

- Avian, Iran
- Abian, Iran
