= Karat, Razavi Khorasan =

Village in Razavi Khorasan province, Iran

Karat Persian: کرات
- Village
- Location within Iran
- Coordinates: 34°34′04″N 60°34′12″E
- Country: Iran
- Province: Razavi Khorasan
- County: Taybad
- District: Central
- Rural District: Karat

Population (2016)
  - Total: 996
- Time zone: UTC+3:30 (IRST)

Karat (Persian: کرات) (Note: Also romanized as Karāt; also known as Kārt) is a village in, and the capital of, Karat Rural District in the Central District of Taybad County, Razavi Khorasan province, Iran.

== Demographics ==
=== Population ===
At the time of the 2006 National Census, the village's population was 950 in 191 households. The following census in 2011 counted 907 people in 225 households. The 2016 census measured the population of the village as 996 people in 281 households.
