= Mashhad Rizeh =

City in Razavi Khorasan province, Iran

Mashhad Rizeh Persian: مشهد ريزه
- City
- Location within Iran
- Coordinates: 34°47′41″N 60°30′52″E
- Country: Iran
- Province: Razavi Khorasan
- County: Taybad
- District: Miyan Velayat
- Established as a city: 2005

Population (2016)
  - Total: 10,105
- Time zone: UTC+3:30 (IRST)

Mashhad Rizeh (Persian: مشهد ريزه) (Note: Also romanized as Mashhad Rīzeh; also known as Mashad-i-Riza and Meshed-i-Riza) is a city in, and the capital of, Miyan Velayat District in Taybad County, Razavi Khorasan province, Iran. It also serves as the administrative center for Dasht-e Taybad Rural District. (Note: Formerly Miyan Velayat Rural District)

== History ==
The name "Rizeh" originates from the word rizeh (رزه) ("vine") because of the vast vineyards in the village. Rizeh was one of the oldest villages in Taybad County. According to popular belief, Rizeh is the remnant of a larger town named Rezvan; the decline after having reached its prime has resulted in the current village, and Rizeh emerges from the name of Rezvan. The town had been surrounded by a wall with the name of Shahrband ("surrounded town"), which indicates the accuracy of this remark.

The nearby village of Rizeh merged with the village of Mashhad Rizeh in 2003, which was converted to a city in 2005.

== Demographics ==
=== Population ===
At the time of the 2006 National Census, the city's population was 8,307 in 1,808 households. The following census in 2011 counted 9,211 people in 2,403 households. The 2016 census measured the population of the city as 10,105 people in 2,781 households.
