= Pain Velayat Rural District (Taybad County) =

Rural district in Razavi Khorasan province, Iran

Pain Velayat Rural District Persian: دهستان پائين ولايت
- Rural District
- Location within Iran
- Coordinates: 34°51′N 60°51′E
- Country: Iran
- Province: Razavi Khorasan
- County: Taybad
- District: Central
- Established: 1986
- Capital: Kariz

Population (2016)
  - Total: 6,586
- Time zone: UTC+3:30 (IRST)

Pain Velayat Rural District (Persian: دهستان پائين ولايت) is in the Central District of Taybad County, Razavi Khorasan province, Iran. It is administered from the city of Kariz.

== Demographics ==
=== Population ===
At the time of the 2006 National Census, the rural district's population was 5,689 in 1,209 households. There were 5,875 inhabitants in 1,342 households at the following census of 2011. The 2016 census measured the population of the rural district as 6,586 in 1,720 households. The most populous of its 35 villages was Arzancheh-ye Sofla, with 1,368 people.

=== Other villages in the rural district ===
- Abbasabad
- Dowqarun
- Feyzabad
- Hajjiabad
- Kalateh-ye Hazarat
- Koshgak
- Mir Aqa Beyk
- Mohsenabad
- Owlya
- Qumi
- Sardab
- Sefid Bala
- Shamsabad
