= Kariz, Razavi Khorasan =

City in Razavi Khorasan province, Iran

Kariz Persian: كاريز
- City
- Location within Iran
- Coordinates: 34°48′42″N 60°49′26″E
- Country: Iran
- Province: Razavi Khorasan
- County: Taybad
- District: Central
- Established as a city: 2003

Population (2016)
  - Total: 11,102
- Time zone: UTC+3:30 (IRST)

Kariz (Persian: كاريز) (Note: Also romanized as Kārīz; also known as Kahrīz and Kārez) is a city in the Central District of Taybad County, Razavi Khorasan province, Iran, serving as the administrative center for Pain Velayat Rural District. The village of Kariz merged with the village of Sadabad (سعدآباد) and was converted to a city in 2003.

== Demographics ==
=== Population ===
At the time of the 2006 National Census, the city's population was 9,565 in 1,968 households. The following census in 2011 counted 10,391 people in 2,509 households. The 2016 census measured the population of the city as 11,102 people in 2,819 households.
