= Karat Rural District =

Rural district in Razavi Khorasan province, Iran

Karat Rural District Persian: دهستان كرات
- Rural District
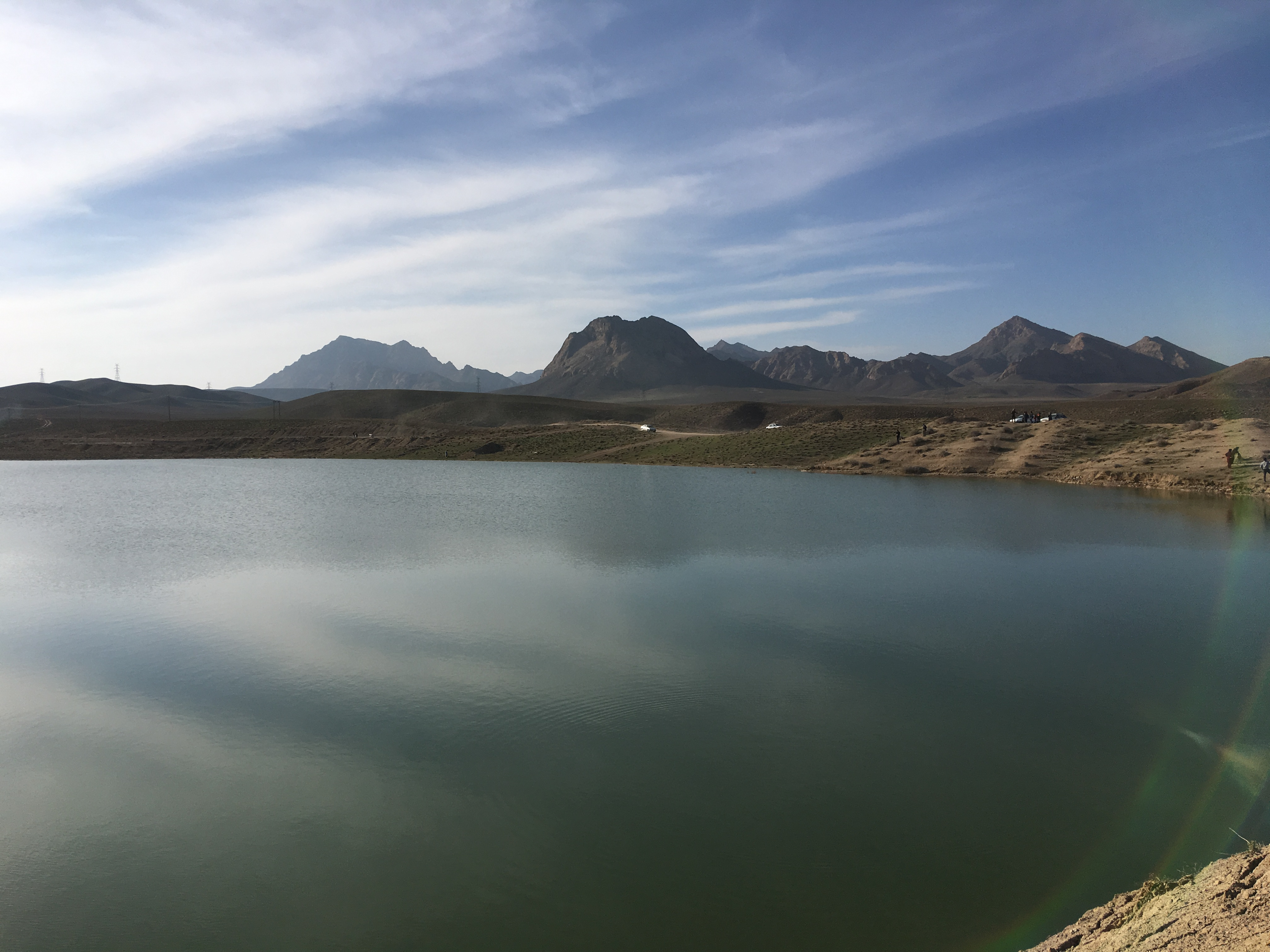
- Ancient site of Dasht-e Karat

- Location within Iran
- Coordinates: 34°35′N 60°37′E
- Country: Iran
- Province: Razavi Khorasan
- County: Taybad
- District: Central
- Established: 1986
- Capital: Karat

Population (2016)
  - Total: 17,955
- Time zone: UTC+3:30 (IRST)

Karat Rural District (Persian: دهستان كرات) is in the Central District of Taybad County, Razavi Khorasan province, Iran. Its capital is the village of Karat.

== Demographics ==
=== Population ===
At the time of the 2006 National Census, the rural district's population was 14,411 in 2,977 households. There were 16,922 inhabitants in 4,083 households at the following census of 2011. The 2016 census measured the population of the rural district as 17,955 in 4,624 households. The most populous of its 21 villages was Poshteh, with 3,028 people.

=== Other villages in the rural district ===
- Abqah
- Asadabad-e Darband
- Farmanabad
- Ferezneh
- Iileh
- Kuhabad
- Qaleh Now-e Abqah
- Rahneh
