= Bala Velayat Rural District =

Bala Velayat Rural District (Persian: دهستان بالاولايت) may refer to:

- Bala Velayat Rural District (Bakharz County)
- Bala Velayat Rural District (Kashmar County)
- Bala Velayat Rural District (Torbat-e Heydarieh County)
