= Kuhsangi Rural District =

Rural district in Razavi Khorasan province, Iran

Kuhsangi Rural District Persian: دهستان كوهسنگي
- Rural District
- Location within Iran
- Coordinates: 34°47′N 60°22′E
- Country: Iran
- Province: Razavi Khorasan
- County: Taybad
- District: Miyan Velayat
- Established: 2003
- Capital: Hoseyni

Population (2016)
  - Total: 5,761
- Time zone: UTC+3:30 (IRST)

Kuhsangi Rural District (Persian: دهستان كوهسنگي) is in Miyan Velayat District of Taybad County, Razavi Khorasan province, Iran. Its capital is the village of Hoseyni.

== Demographics ==
=== Population ===
At the time of the 2006 National Census, the rural district's population was 7,614 in 1,694 households. There were 5,265 inhabitants in 1,344 households at the following census of 2011. The 2016 census measured the population of the rural district as 5,761 in 1,481 households. The most populous of its six villages was Jowzeqan, with 2,121 people.

=== Other villages in the rural district ===
- Kahjah
- Shizan
- Suran
