= Bakharz =

City in Razavi Khorasan province, Iran

Bakharz Persian: باخرز
- City
- Location within Iran
- Coordinates: 34°59′31″N 60°19′01″E
- Country: Iran
- Province: Razavi Khorasan
- County: Bakharz
- District: Central

Population (2016)
  - Total: 9,044
- Time zone: UTC+3:30 (IRST)
- Climate: BSk

Bakharz (Persian: باخرز) (Note: Also known as Ostād, Ostād Bākharz, Ostay, Ostā-ye Bākharz (استای باخرز), and Usta) is a city in the Central District of Bakharz County, Razavi Khorasan province, Iran, serving as capital of both the county and the district.

== Demographics ==
=== Population ===
At the time of the 2006 National Census, the city's population was 6,854 in 1,661 households, when it was capital of the former Bakharz District in Taybad County. The following census in 2011 counted 8,392 people in 2,134 households, by which time the district had been separated from the county in the establishment of Bakharz County. Bakharz was transferred to the new Central District as the county's capital. The 2016 census measured the population of the city as 9,044 people in 2,536 households.

== Notable people ==
- Ali ibn Hassan Bakharzi, poet and secretary
- Sayf al-Din Bakharzi (al-Bakharzi)
