= Nowbahar, Nishapur =

Nowbahar نوبهار
- Village
- Location within Iran
- Coordinates: 36°08′53″N 58°52′25″E
- Country: Iran
- Province: Razavi Khorasan
- County: Nishapur
- Bakhsh: Central
- Rural District: Darbqazi

Population (2006)
  - Total: 72
- Time zone: UTC+3:30 (IRST)
  - Summer (DST): UTC+4:30 (IRDT)

Nowbahar (Persian: نوبهار, also Romanized as Nowbahār and Now Bahār) is a village in Darbqazi Rural District, in the Central District of Nishapur County, Razavi Khorasan Province, Iran. At the 2006 census, its population was 72, in 21 families.
