= Taybad =

City in Razavi Khorasan province, Iran

Taybad Persian: تایباد
- City
- Location within Iran
- Coordinates: 34°44′27″N 60°46′45″E
- Country: Iran
- Province: Razavi Khorasan
- County: Taybad
- District: Central

Population (2016)
  - Total: 56,562
- Time zone: UTC+3:30 (IRST)
- Website: www.taybadcity.com

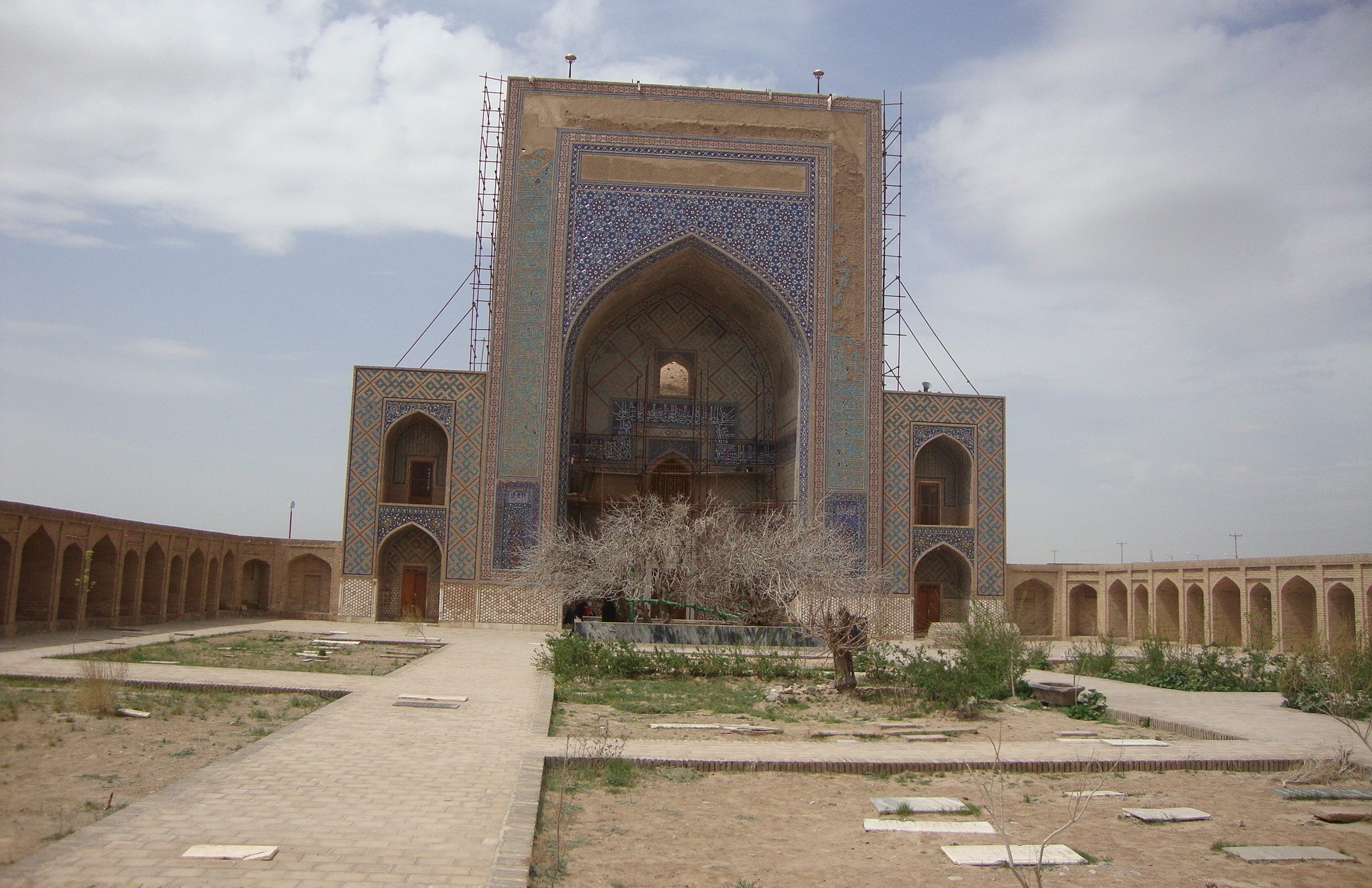
Maulana Abu Bakr Taybadi's tomb and mosque in Taybad city

Taybad (Persian: تایباد) (Note: Also romanized as Taīabad, Tāybād, and Tayebad, also known as Tāyebāt and Ţayyebāt,) is a city in northeastern of Iran. The city is the Central District of Taybad County, Razavi Khorasan province, serving as capital of both the county and the district. Taybad is near the border with Afghanistan.

== Demographics ==
=== Religion ===
While most Iranians, and especially most Iranian Persians, are predominantly Shia, a majority of the population of Taybad are Persian Sunnis.

=== Population ===
At the time of the 2006 National Census, the city's population was 46,228 in 10,230 households. The 2011 census counted 52,280 people in 12,954 households. At the 2016 census, the population of the city was 56,562 people in 14,996 households.
