= Gorazi, Fars =

Gorazi گرازي
- Village
- Location within Iran
- Coordinates: 27°32′22″N 53°12′10″E
- Country: Iran
- Province: Fars
- County: Lamerd
- Bakhsh: Alamarvdasht
- Rural District: Kheyrgu

Population (2006)
  - Total: 55
- Time zone: UTC+3:30 (IRST)
  - Summer (DST): UTC+4:30 (IRDT)

Gorazi (Persian: گرازي, also Romanized as Gorāzī; also known as Gūrāzī) is a village in Kheyrgu Rural District, Alamarvdasht District, Lamerd County, Fars province, Iran. At the 2006 census, its population was 55, in 13 families.
