= Nowbahar, Saqqez =

Nowbahar نوبهار
- Village
- Location within Iran
- Coordinates: 36°22′07″N 46°25′58″E
- Country: Iran
- Province: Kurdistan
- County: Saqqez
- Bakhsh: Central
- Rural District: Sara

Population (2006)
  - Total: 179
- Time zone: UTC+3:30 (IRST)
  - Summer (DST): UTC+4:30 (IRDT)

Nowbahar (Persian: نوبهار, also Romanized as Nowbahār) is a village in Sara Rural District, in the Central District of Saqqez County, Kurdistan Province, Iran. At the 2006 census, its population was 179, in 42 families. The village is populated by Kurds.
