= Kulab-e Fartaq =

Kulab-e Fartaq كولاب فارتق
- Village
- Location within Iran
- Coordinates: 31°17′09″N 50°26′47″E
- Country: Iran
- Province: Kohgiluyeh and Boyer-Ahmad
- County: Kohgiluyeh
- Bakhsh: Dishmok
- Rural District: Bahmayi-ye Sarhadi-ye Sharqi

Population (2006)
  - Total: 120
- Time zone: UTC+3:30 (IRST)
  - Summer (DST): UTC+4:30 (IRDT)

Kulab-e Fartaq (Persian: كولاب فارتق, also Romanized as Kūlab-e Fārtaq; also known as Fartagh, Fārtaq, Fārteq, and Kūlab) is a village in Bahmayi-ye Sarhadi-ye Sharqi Rural District, Dishmok District, Kohgiluyeh County, Kohgiluyeh and Boyer-Ahmad Province, Iran. At the 2006 census, its population was 120, in 21 families.
