= Now Bahar, Kerman =

Now Bahar نوبهار
- Village
- Location within Iran
- Coordinates: 30°25′49″N 56°07′08″E
- Country: Iran
- Province: Kerman
- County: Rafsanjan
- Bakhsh: Central
- Rural District: Qasemabad

Population (2006)
  - Total: 59
- Time zone: UTC+3:30 (IRST)
  - Summer (DST): UTC+4:30 (IRDT)

Now Bahar (Persian: نوبهار, also Romanized as Now Bahār; also known as Nowbahar Hoomeh) is a village in Qasemabad Rural District, in the Central District of Rafsanjan County, Kerman Province, Iran. At the 2006 census, its population was 59, in 9 families.
