= Kalateh-ye Khuni, Fariman =

Kalateh-ye Khuni كلاته خوني
- Village
- Location within Iran
- Coordinates: 35°38′00″N 59°31′28″E
- Country: Iran
- Province: Razavi Khorasan
- County: Fariman
- Bakhsh: Central
- Rural District: Balaband

Population (2006)
  - Total: 21
- Time zone: UTC+3:30 (IRST)
  - Summer (DST): UTC+4:30 (IRDT)

Kalateh-ye Khuni (Persian: كلاته خوني, also Romanized as Kalāteh-ye Khūnī; also known as Kalāteh-ye Ḩūnī) is a village in Balaband Rural District, in the Central District of Fariman County, Razavi Khorasan Province, Iran. At the 2006 census, its population was 21, in 6 families.
