= Kamar Sabz, South Khorasan =

Kamar Sabz كمرسبز
- Village
- Location within Iran
- Coordinates: 31°58′39″N 59°07′33″E
- Country: Iran
- Province: South Khorasan
- County: Khusf
- Bakhsh: Jolgeh-e Mazhan
- Rural District: Qaleh Zari

Population (2006)
  - Total: 36
- Time zone: UTC+3:30 (IRST)
  - Summer (DST): UTC+4:30 (IRDT)

Kamar Sabz (Persian: كمرسبز, also Romanized as Kamar-e Sabz; also known as Kamarsuz and Kamar Boz) is a village in Qaleh Zari Rural District, Jolgeh-e Mazhan District, Khusf County, South Khorasan Province, Iran. At the 2006 census, its population was 36, in 16 families.
