= Kordeyan, Tehran =

Kordeyan كرديان
- Village
- Location within Iran
- Coordinates: 35°51′33″N 51°37′21″E
- Country: Iran
- Province: Tehran
- County: Shemiranat
- Bakhsh: Lavasanat
- Rural District: Lavasan-e Kuchak

Population (2006)
  - Total: 56
- Time zone: UTC+3:30 (IRST)
  - Summer (DST): UTC+4:30 (IRDT)

Kordeyan (Persian: كرديان, also Romanized as Kordeyān) is a village in Lavasan-e Kuchak Rural District, Lavasanat District, Shemiranat County, Tehran Province, Iran. At the 2006 census, its population was 56, in 13 families.
