= Kudian, Shiraz =

Kudian كوديان
- Village
- Location within Iran
- Coordinates: 29°50′47″N 52°12′16″E
- Country: Iran
- Province: Fars
- County: Shiraz
- Bakhsh: Central
- Rural District: Derak

Population (2006)
  - Total: 1,051
- Time zone: UTC+3:30 (IRST)
  - Summer (DST): UTC+4:30 (IRDT)

Kudian (Persian: كوديان, also Romanized as Kūdīān and Kūdeyān; also known as Kordīān and Kordīyān) is a village in Derak Rural District, in the Central District of Shiraz County, Fars province, Iran. At the 2006 census, its population was 1,051, in 207 families.
