= Dasht-e Taybad Rural District =

Rural district in Razavi Khorasan province, Iran

Dasht-e Taybad Rural District Persian: دهستان دشت تايباد
- Rural District
- Location within Iran
- Coordinates: 34°47′N 60°33′E
- Country: Iran
- Province: Razavi Khorasan
- County: Taybad
- District: Miyan Velayat
- Established: 1986
- Capital: Mashhad Rizeh

Population (2016)
  - Total: 9,491
- Time zone: UTC+3:30 (IRST)

Dasht-e Taybad Rural District (Persian: دهستان دشت تايباد) (Note: Formerly Miyan Velayat Rural District (دهستان میان ولایت)) is in Miyan Velayat District of Taybad County, Razavi Khorasan province, Iran. It is administered from the city of Mashhad Rizeh.

== Demographics ==
=== Population ===
At the time of the 2006 National Census, the rural district's population was 11,315 in 2,361 households. There were 8,480 inhabitants in 2,069 households at the following census of 2011. The 2016 census measured the population of the rural district as 9,491 in 2,296 households. The most populous of its nine villages was Kheyrabad, with 4,540 people.

=== Other villages in the rural district ===
- Bidak
- Chahar Borji
- Khiaban
- Pasaveh
- Qaderabad
- Samangan
- Shadi
- Sorkh Sara
