= Malin Rural District =

Rural district in Razavi Khorasan province, Iran

Malin Rural District Persian: دهستان مالین
- Rural District
- Location within Iran
- Coordinates: 34°59′N 60°27′E
- Country: Iran
- Province: Razavi Khorasan
- County: Bakharz
- District: Central
- Established: 1986
- Capital: Shahr-e Now

Population (2016)
  - Total: 18,160
- Time zone: UTC+3:30 (IRST)

Malin Rural District (Persian: دهستان مالین) (Note: Formerly Bakharz Rural District (دهستان باخرز)) is in the Central District of Bakharz County, Razavi Khorasan province, Iran. Its capital is Shahr-e Now.

== Demographics ==
=== Population ===
At the time of the 2006 National Census, the rural district's population (as Bakharz Rural District of the former Bakharz District in Taybad County) was 16,077 in 3,640 households. There were 17,384 inhabitants in 4,424 households at the following census of 2011, by which time the district had been separated from the county in the establishment of Bakharz County. The rural district was transferred to the new Central District and renamed Malin Rural District. The 2016 census measured the population of the rural district as 18,160 in 5,000 households. The most populous of its 29 villages was Ostay, with 2,995 people.

=== Other villages in the rural district ===
- Allahi
- Bezanjerd-e Eslami
- Bohlulabad
- Eshtivan
- Gandom Shad
- Gazik
- Gezicheh
- Hajjiabad
- Jizabad
- Kaj Ab
- Kalateh-ye Khuni
- Kamar Sabz
- Khvajeh Beyg
- Kuh-e Sefid
- Monj
- Moradabad
- Naqareh Khaneh
- Nosratabad
- Now Bahar-e Gholaman
- Now Bahar-e Kordian
- Pol-e Band
- Qaleh Now-e Shamlu
- Shahrak-e Emam Khomeyni
- Siah Lakh
- Tunah
