= Bala Velayat Rural District (Bakharz County) =

Rural district in Razavi Khorasan province, Iran

Bala Velayat Rural District Persian: دهستان بالا ولايت
- Rural District
- Location within Iran
- Coordinates: 35°03′N 60°09′E
- Country: Iran
- Province: Razavi Khorasan
- County: Bakharz
- District: Bala Velayat
- Established: 1986
- Capital: Qaleh Now-e Olya

Population (2016)
  - Total: 10,984
- Time zone: UTC+3:30 (IRST)

Bala Velayat Rural District (Persian: دهستان بالا ولايت) is in Bala Velayat District of Bakharz County, Razavi Khorasan province, Iran. Its capital is the village of Qaleh Now-e Olya.

== Demographics ==
=== Population ===
At the time of the 2006 National Census, the rural district's population (as a part of the former Bakharz District in Taybad County) was 17,145 in 3,723 households. There were 11,752 inhabitants in 3,135 households at the following census of 2011, by which time the district had been separated from the county in the establishment of Bakharz County. The rural district was transferred to the new Bala Velayat District. The 2016 census measured the population of the rural district as 10,984 in 3,225 households. The most populous of its 19 villages was Shahrak-e Shahid Doktor Beheshti, with 1,736 people.

=== Other villages in the rural district ===
- Ab Neyeh
- Abkhizeh
- Avian
- Chahar Taq
- Dashtab
- Estajrud
- Gorazi
- Hoseynabad-e Taqi
- Kafch
- Kulab
- Mohammadabad
- Sarian-e Olya
- Tangal-e Mazar
- Turaneh
