= Miyan Velayat District =

District in Razavi Khorasan province, Iran

Miyan Velayat District Persian: بخش میان ولایت
- District
- Location within Iran
- Coordinates: 34°47′N 60°30′E
- Country: Iran
- Province: Razavi Khorasan
- County: Taybad
- Established: 2003
- Capital: Mashhad Rizeh

Population (2016)
  - Total: 25,357
- Time zone: UTC+3:30 (IRST)

Miyan Velayat District (Persian: بخش میان ولایت) is in Taybad County, Razavi Khorasan province, Iran. Its capital is the city of Mashhad Rizeh.

== Demographics ==
=== Population ===
At the time of the 2006 National Census, the district's population was 22,236 in 5,863 households. The following census in 2011 counted 22,956 people in 5,816 households. The 2016 census measured the population of the district as 25,357 inhabitants in 6,558 households.

=== Administrative divisions ===
Miyan Velayat District Population
| Administrative Divisions | 2006 | 2011 | 2016 |
|---|---|---|---|
| Dasht-e Taybad RD (Note: Formerly Miyan Velayat Rural District) | 11,315 | 8,480 | 9,491 |
| Kuhsangi RD | 7,614 | 5,265 | 5,761 |
| Mashhad Rizeh (city) | 8,307 | 9,211 | 10,105 |
| Total | 27,236 | 22,956 | 25,357 |
RD = Rural District
