= Bala Velayat District =

District in Razavi Khorasan province, Iran

Bala Velayat District Persian: بخش بالا ولایت
- District
- Location within Iran
- Coordinates: 35°08′N 60°10′E
- Country: Iran
- Province: Razavi Khorasan
- County: Bakharz
- Established: 2010
- Capital: Qaleh Now-e Olya

Population (2016)
  - Total: 18,661
- Time zone: UTC+3:30 (IRST)

Bala Velayat District (Persian: بخش بالا ولایت) is in Bakharz County, Razavi Khorasan province, Iran. Its capital is the village of Qaleh Now-e Olya.

== History ==
In 2010, Bakharz District was separated from Taybad County in the establishment of Bakharz County, which was divided into two districts of two rural districts each, with the city of Bakharz as its capital and only city at the time.

== Demographics ==
=== Population ===
At the time of the 2011 National Census, the district's population was 19,140 people in 5,040 households. The 2016 census measured the population of the district as 18,661 inhabitants in 5,328 households.

=== Administrative divisions ===
Bala Velayat District Population
Administrative Divisions	2011	2016
Ashtin RD	7,388	7,677
Bala Velayat RD	11,752	10,984
Total	19,140	18,661
RD = Rural District
