= Central District (Taybad County) =

District in Razavi Khorasan province, Iran

Central District (Taybad County) Persian: بخش مرکزی شهرستان تایباد
- District
- Location within Iran
- Coordinates: 34°45′N 60°47′E
- Country: Iran
- Province: Razavi Khorasan
- County: Taybad
- Capital: Taybad

Population (2016)
  - Total: 92,205
- Time zone: UTC+3:30 (IRST)

The Central District of Taybad County (Persian: بخش مرکزی شهرستان تایباد) is in Razavi Khorasan province, Iran. Its capital is the city of Taybad.

== Demographics ==
=== Population ===
At the time of the 2006 National Census, the district's population was 75,893 in 16,404 households. The following census in 2011 counted 85,468 people in 20,888 households. The 2016 census measured the population of the district as 92,205 inhabitants in 24,159 households.

=== Administrative divisions ===
Central District (Taybad County) Population
Administrative Divisions	2006	2011	2016
Karat RD	14,411	16,922	17,955
Pain Velayat RD	5,689	5,875	6,586
Kariz (city)	9,565	10,391	11,102
Taybad (city)	46,228	52,280	56,562
Total	75,893	85,468	92,205
RD = Rural District
