= Central District (Bakharz County) =

District in Razavi Khorasan province, Iran

Central District (Bakharz County) Persian: بخش مرکزی شهرستان باخرز
- District
- Location within Iran
- Coordinates: 34°59′N 60°24′E
- Country: Iran
- Province: Razavi Khorasan
- County: Bakharz
- Established: 2010
- Capital: Bakharz

Population (2016)
  - Total: 35,954
- Time zone: UTC+3:30 (IRST)

The Central District of Bakharz County (Persian: بخش مرکزی شهرستان باخرز) is in Razavi Khorasan province, Iran. Its capital is the city of Bakharz.

== History ==
In 2010, Bakharz District was separated from Taybad County in the establishment of Bakharz County, which was divided into two districts of two rural districts each, with Bakharz as its capital and only city at the time.

== Demographics ==
=== Population ===
At the time of the 2011 National Census, the district's population was 34,442 people in 8,989 households. The 2016 census measured the population of the district as 35,954 inhabitants in 10,197 households.

=== Administrative divisions ===
Central District (Bakharz County) Population
Administrative Divisions	2011	2016
Dasht-e Arzaneh RD	8,666	8,750
Malin RD (Note: Formerly Bakharz Rural District)	17,384	18,160
Bakharz (city)	8,392	9,044
Total	34,442	35,954
RD = Rural District
