= Bakharz County =

County in Razavi Khorasan province, Iran

Bakharz County Persian: شهرستان باخرز
- County
- Location of Bakharz County in Razavi Khorasan province (center right, pink)

- Location of Razavi Khorasan province in Iran
- Coordinates: 35°03′N 60°20′E
- Country: Iran
- Province: Razavi Khorasan
- Established: 2010
- Capital: Bakharz
- Districts: Central, Bala Velayat

Population (2016)
  - Total: 54,615
- Time zone: UTC+3:30 (IRST)

Bakharz County (Persian: شهرستان باخرز) is in Razavi Khorasan province, Iran. Its capital is the city of Bakharz.

== History ==
In 2010, Bakharz District was separated from Taybad County in the establishment of Bakharz County, which was divided into two districts of two rural districts each, with Bakharz as its capital and only city at the time.

== Demographics ==
=== Population ===
At the time of the 2011 National Census, the district's population was 53,582 people in 14,021 households. The 2016 census measured the population of the district as 54,615 in 15,525 households.

=== Administrative divisions ===
Bakharz County's population history and administrative structure over two consecutive censuses are shown in the following table.

Bakharz County Population
| Administrative Divisions | 2011 | 2016 |
|---|---|---|
| Central District | 34,442 | 35,954 |
| Dasht-e Arzaneh RD | 8,666 | 8,750 |
| Malin RD (Note: Formerly Bakharz Rural District) | 17,384 | 18,160 |
| Bakharz (city) | 8,392 | 9,044 |
| Bala Velayat District | 19,140 | 18,661 |
| Ashtin RD | 7,388 | 7,677 |
| Bala Velayat RD | 11,752 | 10,984 |
| Total | 53,582 | 54,615 |
RD = Rural District

== See also ==
Media related to Bakharz County at Wikimedia Commons
