= Bakharz District =

Former district in Razavi Khorasan province, Iran

Bakharz District Persian: بخش باخرز
- Former District
- Location within Iran
- Coordinates: 35°03′N 60°20′E
- Country: Iran
- Province: Razavi Khorasan
- County: Taybad
- Capital: Bakharz

Population (2006)
  - Total: 40,076
- Time zone: UTC+3:30 (IRST)

Bakharz District (Persian: بخش باخرز) is a former administrative division of Taybad County, Razavi Khorasan province, Iran. Its capital was the city of Bakharz.

== History ==
In 2010, the district was separated from the county in the establishment of Bakharz County.

== Demographics ==
=== Population ===
At the time of the 2006 National Census, the district's population was 40,076 in 9,024 households.

=== Administrative divisions ===
Bakharz District Population
Administrative Divisions	2006
Bakharz RD (Note: Renamed Malin Rural District)	16,077
Bala Velayat RD	17,145
Bakharz (city)	6,854
Total	40,076
RD = Rural District
