= Taybad County =

County in Razavi Khorasan province, Iran

Taybad County Persian: شهرستان تایباد
- County
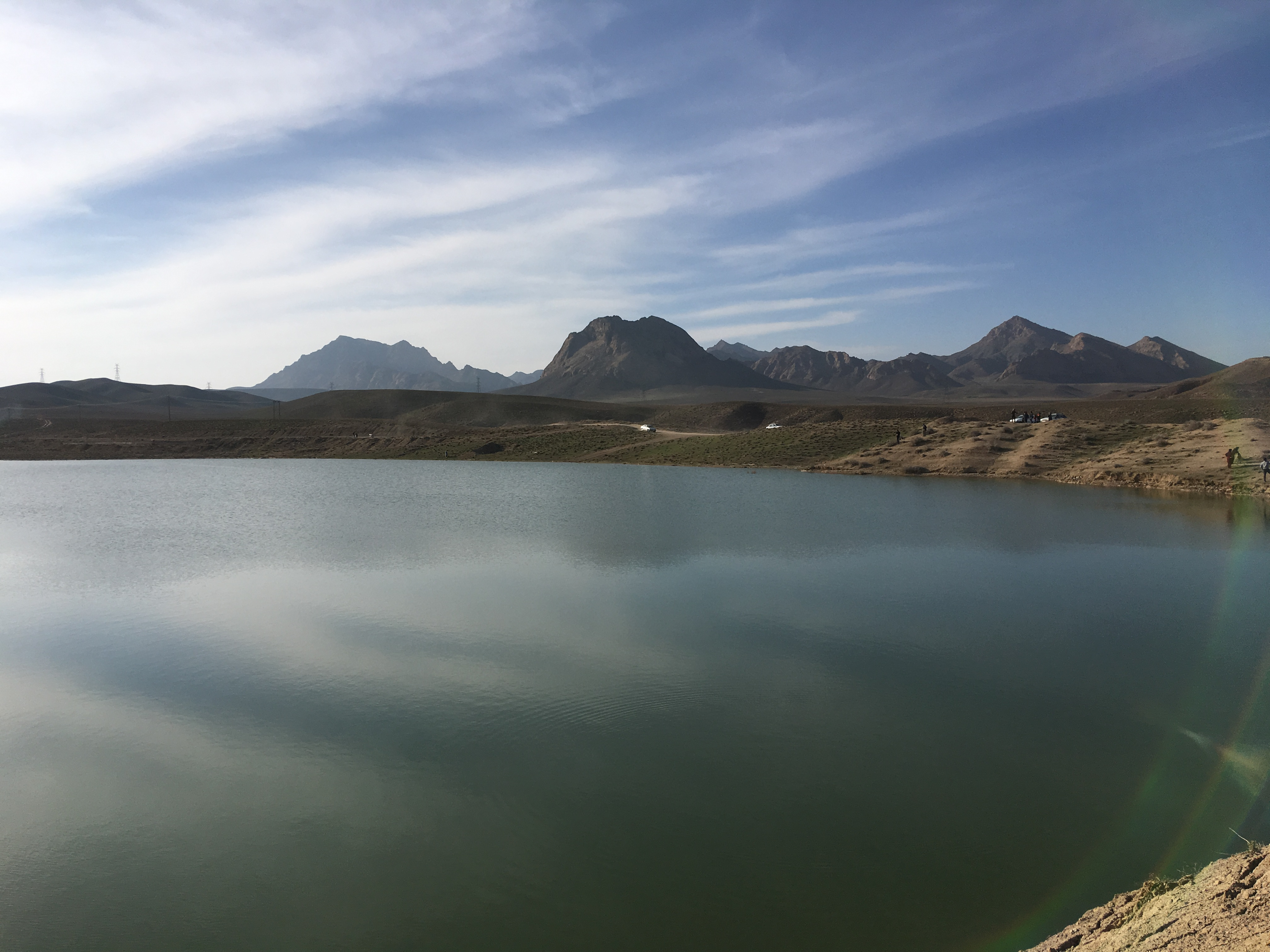
- Ancient site of Dasht-e Karat

- Location of Taybad County in Razavi Khorasan province (bottom right, green)

- Location of Razavi Khorasan province in Iran
- Coordinates: 34°45′N 60°40′E
- Country: Iran
- Province: Razavi Khorasan
- Capital: Taybad
- Districts: Central, Miyan Velayat

Area
  - Total: 2,929 km^{2} (1,131 sq mi)
- Elevation: 810 m (2,660 ft)

Population (2016)
  - Total: 117,564
  - Density: 40.14/km^{2} (104.0/sq mi)
- Time zone: UTC+3:30 (IRST)

Taybad County (Persian: شهرستان تایباد) is in Razavi Khorasan province, Iran. Its capital is the city of Taybad.

== History ==
In 2010, Bakharz District was separated from the county in the establishment of Bakharz County.

== Demographics ==
=== Population ===
At the time of the 2006 National Census, the county's population was 143,205, in 31,291 households. The following census in 2011 counted 108,424 people in 26,673 households. The 2016 census measured the population of the county as 117,564 in 30,718 households.

=== Administrative divisions ===
Taybad County's population history and administrative structure over three consecutive censuses are shown in the following table.

Taybad County Population
Administrative Divisions	2006	2011	2016
Central District	75,893	85,468	92,205
Karat RD	14,411	16,922	17,955
Pain Velayat RD	5,689	5,875	6,586
Kariz (city)	9,565	10,391	11,102
Taybad (city)	46,228	52,280	56,562
Bakharz District (Note: Transferred to Bakharz County)	40,076		
Bakharz RD (Note: Renamed Malin Rural District)	16,077		
Bala Velayat RD	17,145		
Bakharz (city)	6,854		
Miyan Velayat District	27,236	22,956	25,357
Dasht-e Taybad RD (Note: Formerly Miyan Velayat Rural District)	11,315	8,480	9,491
Kuhsangi RD	7,614	5,265	5,761
Mashhad Rizeh (city)	8,307	9,211	10,105
Total	143,205	108,424	117,564
RD = Rural District

== See also ==
Media related to Taybad County at Wikimedia Commons
