= Deh-e Sefid =

Deh-e Sefid or Deh Sefid or Deh Safid (Persian: ده‌سفید or ده سفید) may refer to:

== Hamadan Province ==
- Deh Sefid, Hamadan, a village in Asadabad County

== Kermanshah Province ==
- Deh Sefid, Kermanshah, a village in Kermanshah County
- Deh Sefid, Sarpol-e Zahab, a village in Sarpol-e Zahab County

== Lorestan Province ==
- Deh Sefid Darvish, a village in Lorestan Province, Iran
- Deh Sefid, Borujerd, a village in Lorestan Province, Iran
- Deh Sefid, Khorramabad, a village in Lorestan Province, Iran
- Deh Sefid Karim, a village in Lorestan Province, Iran
- Deh-e Sefid Kan Sorkh, a village in Lorestan Province, Iran
- Deh-e Sefid Salianeh, a village in Lorestan Province, Iran
- Deh Sefid-e Olya, a village in Lorestan Province, Iran
- Deh Sefid-e Sofla, a village in Lorestan Province, Iran
- Deh Sefid-e Vosta, a village in Lorestan Province, Iran
- Kaveh-ye Olya (Deh Sefid), a village in Lorestan Province, Iran

== Markazi Province ==
- Deh Sefid, Markazi, a village in Shazand County

== South Khorasan Province ==
- Deh-e Sefid, South Khorasan, a village in South Khorasan Province, Iran
