= Shah Neshin =

Shah Neshin (Persian: شاه نشين) may refer to:

- Shah Neshin, Gilan
- Shah Neshin, Khuzestan
- Shah Neshin, Bagh-e Malek, Khuzestan Province
- Shah Neshin, Kohgiluyeh and Boyer-Ahmad
- Shah Neshin, Kurdistan
- Shah Neshin, Yazd
- Shah Neshin (mountain)
