= Khalilan =

Khalilan or Khalilyan (Persian: خليلان) may refer to:

- Khalilan, Gilan
- Khalilan, South Khorasan
- Khalilan-e Olya (disambiguation)
- Khalilan-e Sofla (disambiguation)
