= Sheykh Mahalleh, Shaft =

Sheykh Mahalleh شيخ محله
- Village
- Location within Iran
- Coordinates: 37°06′25″N 49°30′02″E
- Country: Iran
- Province: Gilan
- County: Shaft
- Bakhsh: Central
- Rural District: Jirdeh

Population (2016)
  - Total: 205
- Time zone: UTC+3:30 (IRST)

Sheykh Mahalleh (Persian: شيخ محله, also Romanized as Sheykh Maḩalleh; also known as Shāh Mahalleh and Shakhmagalle) is a village in Jirdeh Rural District, in the Central District of Shaft County, Gilan Province, Iran.

At the time of the 2006 National Census, the village's population was 319 in 85 households. The following census in 2011 counted 262 people in 83 households. The 2016 census measured the population of the village as 205 people in 74 households.
