= Pir Mowmen Sara =

Pir Mowmen Sara پيرمومن سرا
- Village
- Location within Iran
- Coordinates: 37°11′01″N 49°22′00″E
- Country: Iran
- Province: Gilan
- County: Shaft
- Bakhsh: Central
- Rural District: Jirdeh

Population (2006)
  - Total: 334
- Time zone: UTC+3:30 (IRST)
  - Summer (DST): UTC+4:30 (IRDT)

Pir Mowmen Sara (Persian: پيرمومن سرا, also Romanized as Pīr Mow’men Sarā) is a village in Jirdeh Rural District, in the Central District of Shaft County, Gilan Province, Iran. At the 2006 census, its population was 334, in 99 families.
