= Lifku Khandan =

Lifku Khandan ليفكوخندان
- Village
- Location within Iran
- Coordinates: 37°06′57″N 49°26′54″E
- Country: Iran
- Province: Gilan
- County: Shaft
- Bakhsh: Ahmadsargurab
- Rural District: Chubar

Population (2006)
  - Total: 304
- Time zone: UTC+3:30 (IRST)
  - Summer (DST): UTC+4:30 (IRDT)

Lifku Khandan (Persian: ليفكوخندان, also Romanized as Līfkū Khandān) is a village in Chubar Rural District, Ahmadsargurab District, Shaft County, Gilan Province, Iran. At the 2006 census, its population was 304, in 82 families.
