= Tani Mahalleh =

Tani Mahalleh تاني محله
- Village
- Location within Iran
- Coordinates: 37°07′45″N 49°26′09″E
- Country: Iran
- Province: Gilan
- County: Shaft
- Bakhsh: Ahmadsargurab
- Rural District: Chubar

Population (2006)
  - Total: 295
- Time zone: UTC+3:30 (IRST)
  - Summer (DST): UTC+4:30 (IRDT)

Tani Mahalleh (Persian: تاني محله, also Romanized as Tānī Maḩalleh; also known as Ta’anī Maḩalleh) is a village in Chubar Rural District, Ahmadsargurab District, Shaft County, Gilan Province, Iran. At the 2006 census, its population was 295, in 83 families.
