= Mashallah Kol =

Mashallah Kol ماشاء الله کل
- Village
- Location within Iran
- Coordinates: 37°04′58″N 49°26′03″E
- Country: Iran
- Province: Gilan
- County: Shaft
- Bakhsh: Ahmadsargurab
- Rural District: Chubar

Population (2006)
  - Total: 62
- Time zone: UTC+3:30 (IRST)
  - Summer (DST): UTC+4:30 (IRDT)

Mashallah Kol (Persian: ماشاء الله کل, also Romanized as Māshāllāh Kol) is a village in Chubar Rural District, Ahmadsargurab District, Shaft County, Gilan Province, Iran. At the 2006 census, its population was 62, in 14 families.
