= Takram =

Takram تكرم
- Village
- Location within Iran
- Coordinates: 37°10′48″N 49°28′14″E
- Country: Iran
- Province: Gilan
- County: Shaft
- Bakhsh: Central
- Rural District: Jirdeh

Population (2006)
  - Total: 582
- Time zone: UTC+3:30 (IRST)
  - Summer (DST): UTC+4:30 (IRDT)

Takram (Persian: تكرم, also Romanized as Tekerem; also known as Āb-e-Takrīm and Āb-i-Takrim) is a village in Jirdeh Rural District, in the Central District of Shaft County, Gilan Province, Iran. At the 2006 census, its population was 582, in 154 families.
