= Chub Tarashan =

Chub Tarashan چوبتراشان
- Village
- Location within Iran
- Coordinates: 37°04′21″N 49°22′07″E
- Country: Iran
- Province: Gilan
- County: Shaft
- Bakhsh: Ahmadsargurab
- Rural District: Chubar

Population (2006)
  - Total: 316
- Time zone: UTC+3:30 (IRST)
  - Summer (DST): UTC+4:30 (IRDT)

Chub Tarashan (Persian: چوبتراشان, also Romanized as Chūb Tarāshān) is a village in Chubar Rural District, Ahmadsargurab District, Shaft County, Gilan Province, Iran. At the 2006 census, its population was 316, in 68 families.
