= Barzuhandan =

Barzuhandan برزوهندان
- Village
- Location within Iran
- Coordinates: 37°11′19″N 49°27′28″E
- Country: Iran
- Province: Gilan
- County: Shaft
- Bakhsh: Central
- Rural District: Jirdeh

Population (2006)
  - Total: 556
- Time zone: UTC+3:30 (IRST)
  - Summer (DST): UTC+4:30 (IRDT)

Barzuhandan (Persian: برزوهندان, also Romanized as Barzūhandān; also known as Barzūkhandān) is a village in Jirdeh Rural District, in the Central District of Shaft County, Gilan Province, Iran. At the 2006 census, its population was 556, in 125 families.
