= Kulavan =

Kulavan كولوان
- Village
- Location within Iran
- Coordinates: 37°02′47″N 49°22′46″E
- Country: Iran
- Province: Gilan
- County: Shaft
- Bakhsh: Ahmadsargurab
- Rural District: Chubar

Population (2006)
  - Total: 633
- Time zone: UTC+3:30 (IRST)
  - Summer (DST): UTC+4:30 (IRDT)

Kulavan (Persian: كولوان, also Romanized as Kūlavān; also known as Kolavān) is a village in Chubar Rural District, Ahmadsargurab District, Shaft County, Gilan Province, Iran. At the 2006 census, its population was 633, in 171 families.
