= Bialva =

Bialva بيالوا
- Village
- Location within Iran
- Coordinates: 37°09′41″N 49°29′19″E
- Country: Iran
- Province: Gilan
- County: Shaft
- Bakhsh: Central
- Rural District: Jirdeh

Population (2006)
  - Total: 393
- Time zone: UTC+3:30 (IRST)
  - Summer (DST): UTC+4:30 (IRDT)

Bialva (Persian: بيالوا, also Romanized as Bīālvā and Bīālvā’) is a village in Jirdeh Rural District, in the Central District of Shaft County, Gilan Province, Iran. At the 2006 census, its population was 393, in 90 families.
