= Lisom =

Lisom ليسم
- Village
- Location within Iran
- Coordinates: 37°04′04″N 49°21′41″E
- Country: Iran
- Province: Gilan
- County: Shaft
- Bakhsh: Ahmadsargurab
- Rural District: Chubar

Population (2006)
  - Total: 82
- Time zone: UTC+3:30 (IRST)
  - Summer (DST): UTC+4:30 (IRDT)

Lisom (Persian: ليسم, also Romanized as Līsom) is a village in Chubar Rural District, Ahmadsargurab District, Shaft County, Gilan Province, Iran. At the 2006 census, its population was 82, in 20 families.
