= Dakleh Sara =

Dakleh Sara داكله سرا
- Village
- Location within Iran
- Coordinates: 37°04′17″N 49°23′27″E
- Country: Iran
- Province: Gilan
- County: Shaft
- Bakhsh: Ahmadsargurab
- Rural District: Chubar

Population (2006)
  - Total: 150
- Time zone: UTC+3:30 (IRST)
  - Summer (DST): UTC+4:30 (IRDT)

Dakleh Sara (Persian: داكله سرا, also Romanized as Dākleh Sarā and Dakaleh Sarā) is a village in Chubar Rural District, Ahmadsargurab District, Shaft County, Gilan Province, Iran. At the 2006 census, its population was 150, in 41 families.
