= Lakhteki =

Lakhteki لختكي
- Village
- Location within Iran
- Coordinates: 37°10′56″N 49°23′29″E
- Country: Iran
- Province: Gilan
- County: Shaft
- Bakhsh: Central
- Rural District: Jirdeh

Population (2006)
  - Total: 432
- Time zone: UTC+3:30 (IRST)
  - Summer (DST): UTC+4:30 (IRDT)

Lakhteki (Persian: لختكي, also Romanized as Lakhtekī; also known as Lakhtekeh) is a village in Jirdeh Rural District, in the Central District of Shaft County, Gilan Province, Iran. At the 2006 census, its population was 432, in 112 families.
