= Aqa Nur-e Sehtan =

Aqa Nur-e Sehtan اقانورسه تن
- Village
- Location within Iran
- Coordinates: 37°06′09″N 49°26′07″E
- Country: Iran
- Province: Gilan
- County: Shaft
- Bakhsh: Ahmadsargurab
- Rural District: Chubar

Population (2006)
  - Total: 37
- Time zone: UTC+3:30 (IRST)
  - Summer (DST): UTC+4:30 (IRDT)

Aqa Nur-e Sehtan (Persian: اقانورسه تن, also Romanized as Āqā Nūr-e Sehtan) is a village in Chubar Rural District, Ahmadsargurab District, Shaft County, Gilan Province, Iran. At the 2006 census, its population was 37, in 8 families.
