= Zardkam =

Zardkam زردكام
- Village
- Location within Iran
- Coordinates: 37°05′45″N 49°24′09″E
- Country: Iran
- Province: Gilan
- County: Shaft
- Bakhsh: Ahmadsargurab
- Rural District: Ahmadsargurab

Population (2006)
  - Total: 74
- Time zone: UTC+3:30 (IRST)
  - Summer (DST): UTC+4:30 (IRDT)

Zardkam (Persian: زردكام, also Romanized as Zardkām; also known as Palang Posht) is a village in Ahmadsargurab Rural District, Ahmadsargurab District, Shaft County, Gilan Province, Iran. At the 2006 census, there were only 18 families with its total population being 74.
