= Kalach Khandan =

Kalach Khandan كلاچ خندان
- Village
- Location within Iran
- Coordinates: 37°07′46″N 49°30′00″E
- Country: Iran
- Province: Gilan
- County: Shaft
- Bakhsh: Central
- Rural District: Jirdeh

Population (2016)
  - Total: 65
- Time zone: UTC+3:30 (IRST)

Kalach Khandan (Persian: كلاچ خندان, also Romanized as Kalāch Khandān; also known as Kalāj Khandān and Nūr Deh) is a village in Jirdeh Rural District, in the Central District of Shaft County, Gilan Province, Iran. At the 2016 census, its population was 65, in 26 families. Decreased from 163 people in 2006
