= Rangrazan =

Rangrazan (Persian: رنگرزان) may refer to:

- Rangrazan-e Olya
- Rangrazan-e Sofla
- Rangrazan-e Vosta

== See also ==
- Rangrez, a painter caste in India
- Rangrezz, a 2013 Indian film by Priyadarshan
- Rangrezz (TV series), an Indian drama television series
