= Posht Sara =

Posht Sara پشتسرا
- Village
- Location within Iran
- Coordinates: 37°08′13″N 49°24′41″E
- Country: Iran
- Province: Gilan
- County: Shaft
- Bakhsh: Central
- Rural District: Jirdeh

Population (2006)
  - Total: 411
- Time zone: UTC+3:30 (IRST)
  - Summer (DST): UTC+4:30 (IRDT)

Posht Sara (Persian: پشتسرا, also Romanized as Posht Sarā and Posht Serā) is a village in Jirdeh Rural District, in the Central District of Shaft County, Gilan Province, Iran. At the 2006 census, its population was 411, in 103 families.
