= Duliskan =

Duliskan, Dulis Kan, Dhulis Kan, Doliskan, Dowlisgan, Dowliskan, and Dulisgan (Persian: دوليسكان) may refer to:

- Duliskan-e Olya
- Duliskan-e Sofla
- Duliskan-e Vosta
