= Jirdeh =

Jirdeh or Jir Deh (Persian: جيرده) may refer to:

- Jirdeh, Fuman
- Jir Deh, Rudsar
- Jirdeh, Shaft
- Jirdeh-e Pasikhan, Shaft County
- Jirdeh Rural District, in Shaft County
