= Fashalam =

Fashalam فشالم
- Village
- Location within Iran
- Coordinates: 37°15′18″N 49°25′42″E
- Country: Iran
- Province: Gilan
- County: Shaft
- Bakhsh: Central
- Rural District: Molla Sara

Population (2006)
  - Total: 211
- Time zone: UTC+3:30 (IRST)
  - Summer (DST): UTC+4:30 (IRDT)

Fashalam (Persian: فشالم, also Romanized as Fashālam; also known as Pshalym) is a village in Molla Sara Rural District, in the Central District of Shaft County, Gilan Province, Iran. At the 2006 census, its population was 211, in 60 families.
