= Kharfakol =

Kharfakol خرفكل
- Village
- Location within Iran
- Coordinates: 37°06′37″N 49°22′51″E
- Country: Iran
- Province: Gilan
- County: Shaft
- Bakhsh: Ahmadsargurab
- Rural District: Ahmadsargurab

Population (2006)
  - Total: 640
- Time zone: UTC+3:30 (IRST)
  - Summer (DST): UTC+4:30 (IRDT)

Kharfakol (Persian: خرفكل; also known as Khal’fakyul’, Kharfeh Kal, and Kharfeh Kol) is a village in Ahmadsargurab Rural District, Ahmadsargurab District, Shaft County, Gilan Province, Iran. At the 2006 census, its population was 640, in 155 families.
