= Salek Moallem =

Salek Moallem سالك معلم
- Village
- Location within Iran
- Coordinates: 37°05′00″N 49°18′12″E
- Country: Iran
- Province: Gilan
- County: Shaft
- Bakhsh: Ahmadsargurab
- Rural District: Ahmadsargurab

Population (2006)
  - Total: 476
- Time zone: UTC+3:30 (IRST)
  - Summer (DST): UTC+4:30 (IRDT)

Salek Moallem (Persian: سالك معلم, also Romanized as Sālak Mo‘allem and Sālek Mo‘allem) is a village in Ahmadsargurab Rural District, Ahmadsargurab District, Shaft County, Gilan Province, Iran. At the 2006 census, its population was 476, in 116 families.
