= Kumsar =

Kumsar كومسار
- Village
- Location within Iran
- Coordinates: 37°01′24″N 49°37′11″E
- Country: Iran
- Province: Gilan
- County: Shaft
- Bakhsh: Central
- Rural District: Jirdeh

Population (2006)
  - Total: 559
- Time zone: UTC+3:30 (IRST)
  - Summer (DST): UTC+4:30 (IRDT)

Kumsar (Persian: كومسار, also Romanized as Kūmsār; also known as Gol Sarak-e Bālā Maḩalleh, Kolasarak, Kolsarak, Kulisarak, and Kūmsarak) is a village in Jirdeh Rural District, in the Central District of Shaft County, Gilan Province, Iran. At the 2006 census, its population was 559, in 128 families.
