= Shaft, Iran =

City in Gilan province, Iran

Shaft Persian: شفت
- City
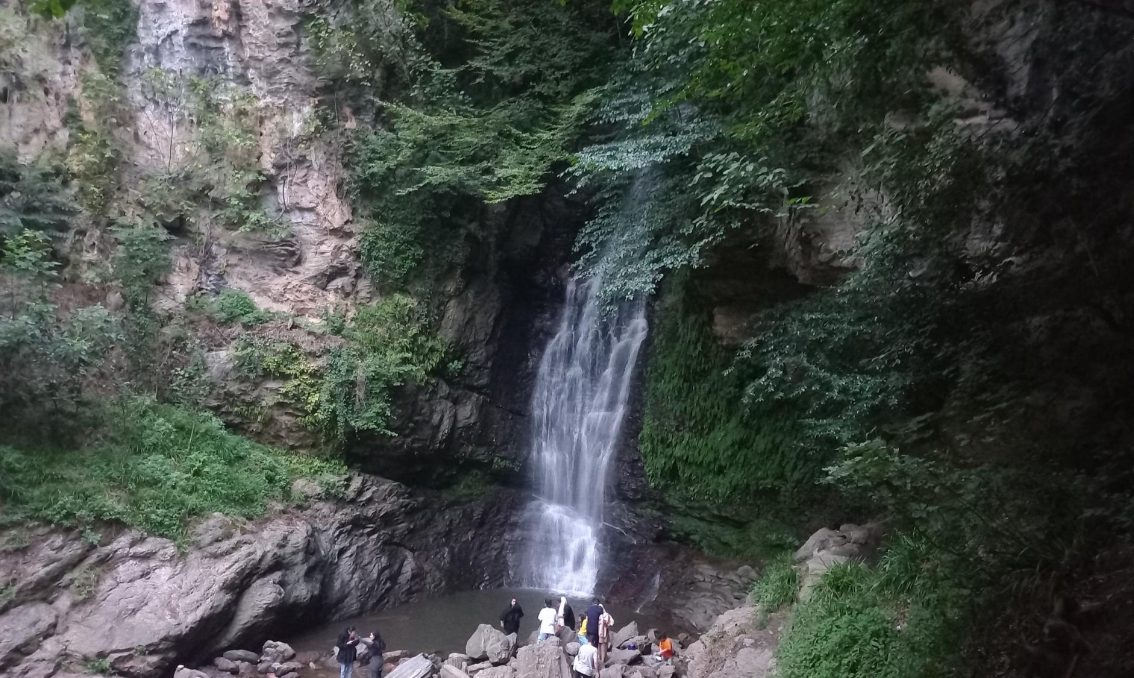

- Location within Iran
- Coordinates: 37°10′13″N 49°24′06″E
- Country: Iran
- Province: Gilan
- County: Shaft
- District: Central

Population (2016)
  - Total: 8,184
- Time zone: UTC+3:30 (IRST)

Shaft (Persian: شفت) (Note: Also known as Bāzār Shaft) is a city in the Central District of Shaft County, Gilan province, Iran, serving as capital of both the county and the district.

== Demographics ==
=== Population ===
At the time of the 2006 National Census, the city's population was 6,158 in 1,700 households. The following census in 2011 counted 6,533 people in 2,001 households. The 2016 census measured the population of the city as 8,184 people in 2,691 households.

== Geography ==
Shaft is approximately 20 kilometres (12 mi) southwest of Rasht. Nearby major villages are Ahmadsargurab Kalashem-e Bala, Chubar, and Kozan. Some of the nearby villages like Imamzadeh Ebrahim have mountainous landscape which attract people from other cities on holidays. Rudkhan Castle is a tourist attraction in the vicinity of Shaft.

== Economy ==
Rural economic activities include rice cultivation, fish farming, and animal husbandry.

On Mondays, Doshanbeh Bazaar, a local trade market is held there. That is why many know the place as Doshanbeh (Monday). Its local dishes are pala kebab, baghlaghatogh, and jaghoorbaghoor.

== Notable people ==
- Mojtaba Asghari, Freestyle Wrestler
- Mohammad Bagher Schafti
- Parvaz Homay

== Notes ==
- Doshanbeh Bazaar, Shaft
