= Mozhdeheh =

Mozhdeheh مژدهه
- Village
- Location within Iran
- Coordinates: 37°05′30″N 49°28′31″E
- Country: Iran
- Province: Gilan
- County: Shaft
- Bakhsh: Central
- Rural District: Jirdeh

Population (2006)
  - Total: 676
- Time zone: UTC+3:30 (IRST)
  - Summer (DST): UTC+4:30 (IRDT)

Mozhdeheh (Persian: مژدهه; also known as Mozhdeheh Bālā) is a village in Jirdeh Rural District, in the Central District of Shaft County, Gilan Province, Iran. At the 2006 census, its population was 676, in 167 families.
