= Baba Rekab =

Baba Rekab باباركاب
- Village
- Location within Iran
- Coordinates: 37°01′35″N 49°25′22″E
- Country: Iran
- Province: Gilan
- County: Shaft
- Bakhsh: Ahmadsargurab
- Rural District: Chubar

Population (2006)
  - Total: 117
- Time zone: UTC+3:30 (IRST)
  - Summer (DST): UTC+4:30 (IRDT)

Baba Rekab (Persian: باباركاب, also Romanized as Bābā Rekāb) is a village in Chubar Rural District, Ahmadsargurab District, Shaft County, Gilan Province, Iran. At the 2006 census, its population was 117, in 28 families.
