= Mahraman =

Mahraman محرمان
- Village
- Location within Iran
- Coordinates: 37°05′32″N 49°22′29″E
- Country: Iran
- Province: Gilan
- County: Shaft
- Bakhsh: Ahmadsargurab
- Rural District: Chubar

Population (2006)
  - Total: 293
- Time zone: UTC+3:30 (IRST)
  - Summer (DST): UTC+4:30 (IRDT)

Mahraman (Persian: محرمان, also Romanized as Maḩramān) is a village in Chubar Rural District, Ahmadsargurab District, Shaft County, Gilan Province, Iran. At the 2006 census, its population was 293, in 69 families.
