= Khareh Kesh =

Khareh Kesh خره كش
- Village
- Location within Iran
- Coordinates: 36°56′48″N 49°15′45″E
- Country: Iran
- Province: Gilan
- County: Shaft
- Bakhsh: Ahmadsargurab
- Rural District: Ahmadsargurab

Population (2006)
  - Total: 596
- Time zone: UTC+3:30 (IRST)
  - Summer (DST): UTC+4:30 (IRDT)

Khareh Kesh (Persian: خره كش; also known as Kharkesh) is a village in Ahmadsargurab Rural District, Ahmadsargurab District, Shaft County, Gilan Province, Iran. At the 2006 census, its population was 596, in 141 families.
