= Vali Sara =

Vali Sara والي سرا
- Village
- Location within Iran
- Coordinates: 37°05′29″N 49°23′16″E
- Country: Iran
- Province: Gilan
- County: Shaft
- Bakhsh: Ahmadsargurab
- Rural District: Ahmadsargurab

Population (2006)
  - Total: 280
- Time zone: UTC+3:30 (IRST)
  - Summer (DST): UTC+4:30 (IRDT)

Vali Sara (Persian: والي سرا, also Romanized as Vālī Sarā) is a village in Ahmadsargurab Rural District, Ahmadsargurab District, Shaft County, Gilan Province, Iran. At the 2006 census, its population was 280, in 73 families.
