= Khomeyran, Shaft =

Khomeyran خميران
- village
- Location within Iran
- Coordinates: 37°17′21″N 49°45′22″E
- Country: Iran
- Province: Gilan
- County: Shaft
- Bakhsh: Central
- Rural District: Jirdeh

Population (2006)
  - Total: 380
- Time zone: UTC+3:30 (IRST)
  - Summer (DST): UTC+4:30 (IRDT)

Khomeyran (Persian: خميران, also Romanized as Khomeyrān) is a village in Jirdeh Rural District, in the Central District of Shaft County, Gilan Province, Iran. At the 2006 census, its population was 380, in 90 families.
