= Seleh Marz =

Village in Gilan province, Iran

Seleh Marz Persian: سله مرز
- Village
- Location within Iran
- Coordinates: 37°01′41″N 49°20′04″E
- Country: Iran
- Province: Gilan
- County: Shaft
- District: Ahmadsargurab
- Rural District: Chubar

Population (2016)
  - Total: 429
- Time zone: UTC+3:30 (IRST)

Seleh Marz (Persian: سله مرز) is a village in Chubar Rural District of Ahmadsargurab District in Shaft County, Gilan province, Iran.

== Demographics ==
=== Population ===
At the time of the 2006 National Census, the village's population was 770 in 168 households. The following census in 2011 counted 592 people in 163 households. The 2016 census measured the population of the village as 429 people in 147 households.
