= Pir Deh-e Shaft =

Pir Deh-e Shaft پيرده شفت
- Village
- Location within Iran
- Coordinates: 37°10′37″N 49°25′33″E
- Country: Iran
- Province: Gilan
- County: Shaft
- Bakhsh: Central
- Rural District: Jirdeh

Population (2006)
  - Total: 389
- Time zone: UTC+3:30 (IRST)
  - Summer (DST): UTC+4:30 (IRDT)

Pir Deh-e Shaft (Persian: پيرده شفت, also Romanized as Pīr Deh-e Shaft; also known as Pīr Deh) is a village in Jirdeh Rural District, in the Central District of Shaft County, Gilan Province, Iran. At the 2006 census, its population was 389, in 114 families.
