= Girchan =

Girchan (Persian: گيرچان) may refer to:

- Girchan, Khorramabad
- Girchan, Zagheh
