= Kish Khaleh =

Kish Khaleh (Persian: كيش خاله) may refer to:

- Kish Khaleh, Masal
- Kish Khaleh, Rezvanshahr
- Kish Khaleh, Shaft
