= Osmavandan =

Village in Gilan province, Iran

Osmavandan Persian: عثماوندان
- Village
- Location within Iran
- Coordinates: 37°09′14″N 49°23′30″E
- Country: Iran
- Province: Gilan
- County: Shaft
- District: Central
- Rural District: Jirdeh

Population (2016)
  - Total: 600
- Time zone: UTC+3:30 (IRST)

Osmavandan (Persian: عثماوندان) (Note: Also romanized as ‘Os̄māvandān; also known as Usmamanda) is a village in Jirdeh Rural District of the Central District in Shaft County, Gilan province, Iran.

== Demographics ==
=== Population ===
At the time of the 2006 National Census, the village's population was 759 in 216 households. The following census in 2011 counted 725 people in 244 households. The 2016 census measured the population of the village as 600 people in 210 households.

== 2026 Iran War ==
Osmavandan was attacked by the US-Israeli forces on Sunday, 29th of March 2026. 5 houses were destroyed and 6 people were killed in this attack.
