= Kuzan, Gilan =

Village in Gilan province, Iran

Kuzan Persian: كوزان
- Village
- Location within Iran
- Coordinates: 37°12′26″N 49°28′30″E
- Country: Iran
- Province: Gilan
- County: Shaft
- District: Central
- Rural District: Jirdeh

Population (2016)
  - Total: 519
- Time zone: UTC+3:30 (IRST)

Kuzan (Persian: كوزان) (Note: Also romanized as Kūzān; also known as Kevzan) is a village in Jirdeh Rural District of the Central District in Shaft County, Gilan province, Iran.

== Demographics ==
=== Population ===
At the time of the 2006 National Census, the village's population was 731 in 182 households. The following census in 2011 counted 607 people in 192 households. The 2016 census measured the population of the village as 519 people in 175 households.
