= Lasak, Gilan =

Village in Gilan province, Iran

Lasak Persian: لاسك
- Village
- Location within Iran
- Coordinates: 37°02′46″N 49°23′52″E
- Country: Iran
- Province: Gilan
- County: Shaft
- District: Ahmadsargurab
- Rural District: Chubar

Population (2016)
  - Total: 556
- Time zone: UTC+3:30 (IRST)

Lasak (Persian: لاسك) (Note: Also romanized as Lāsak) is a village in Chubar Rural District of Ahmadsargurab District in Shaft County, Gilan province, Iran.

== Demographics ==
=== Population ===
At the time of the 2006 National Census, the village's population was 773 in 214 households. The following census in 2011 counted 545 people in 191 households. The 2016 census measured the population of the village as 556 people in 203 households.
