= Talesh Mahalleh, Shaft =

Talesh Mahalleh طالش محله
- Village
- Location within Iran
- Coordinates: 37°15′32″N 49°25′03″E
- Country: Iran
- Province: Gilan
- County: Shaft
- Bakhsh: Central
- Rural District: Molla Sara

Population (2006)
  - Total: 626
- Time zone: UTC+3:30 (IRST)
  - Summer (DST): UTC+4:30 (IRDT)

Talesh Mahalleh (Persian: طالش محله, also Romanized as Ţālesh Maḩalleh) is a village in Molla Sara Rural District, in the Central District of Shaft County, Gilan Province, Iran. At the 2006 census, its population was 626, in 157 families.
