= Kuzeh Garan, Gilan =

Kuzeh Garan كوزه گران
- Village
- Location within Iran
- Coordinates: 37°15′27″N 49°26′57″E
- Country: Iran
- Province: Gilan
- County: Shaft
- Bakhsh: Central
- Rural District: Molla Sara

Population (2006)
  - Total: 356
- Time zone: UTC+3:30 (IRST)
  - Summer (DST): UTC+4:30 (IRDT)

Kuzeh Garan (Persian: كوزه گران, also Romanized as Kūzeh Garān) is a village in Molla Sara Rural District, in the Central District of Shaft County, Gilan Province, Iran. At the 2006 census, its population was 356, in 93 families.
