= Visrud =

Village in Gilan province, Iran

Visrud Persian: ويسرود
- Village
- Location within Iran
- Coordinates: 37°00′50″N 49°22′00″E
- Country: Iran
- Province: Gilan
- County: Shaft
- District: Ahmadsargurab
- Rural District: Chubar

Population (2016)
  - Total: 751
- Time zone: UTC+3:30 (IRST)

Visrud (Persian: ويسرود) (Note: Also romanized as Vīsrūd) is a village in Chubar Rural District of Ahmadsargurab District in Shaft County, Gilan province, Iran.

== Demographics ==
=== Population ===
At the time of the 2006 National Census, the village's population was 1,148 in 305 households. The following census in 2011 counted 879 people in 276 households. The 2016 census measured the population of the village as 751 people in 272 households.
