= Mir Ahmadi =

Mir Ahmadi (Persian: ميراحمدي) may refer to:

- Mir Ahmadi, Kerman
- Mir Ahmadi, Razan, Lorestan Province
- Mir Ahmadi, Zagheh, Lorestan Province
