= Kasan, Iran =

Village in Gilan province, Iran

Kasan Persian: كاسان
- Village
- Location within Iran
- Coordinates: 37°15′49″N 49°28′03″E
- Country: Iran
- Province: Gilan
- County: Shaft
- District: Central
- Rural District: Molla Sara

Population (2016)
  - Total: 567
- Time zone: UTC+3:30 (IRST)

Kasan (Persian: كاسان) (Note: Also romanized as Kāsān; also known as Kaskan) is a village in Molla Sara Rural District of the Central District in Shaft County, Gilan province, Iran.

== Demographics ==
=== Population ===
At the time of the 2006 National Census, the village's population was 696 in 184 households. The following census in 2011 counted 713 people in 214 households. The 2016 census measured the population of the village as 567 people in 182 households.
