= Mardekheh =

Village in Gilan province, Iran

Mardekheh Persian: مردخه
- Village
- Location within Iran
- Coordinates: 37°09′04″N 49°21′44″E
- Country: Iran
- Province: Gilan
- County: Shaft
- District: Central
- Rural District: Jirdeh

Population (2016)
  - Total: 907
- Time zone: UTC+3:30 (IRST)

Mardekheh (Persian: مردخه) (Note: Also romanized as Mardakhe and Mardakheh) is a village in Jirdeh Rural District of the Central District in Shaft County, Gilan province, Iran.

== Demographics ==
=== Population ===
At the time of the 2006 National Census, the village's population was 888 in 233 households. The following census in 2011 counted 861 people in 290 households. The 2016 census measured the population of the village as 907 people in 344 households.
