= Lepundan =

Village in Gilan province, Iran

Lepundan Persian: لپوندان
- Village
- Location within Iran
- Coordinates: 37°04′36″N 49°17′43″E
- Country: Iran
- Province: Gilan
- County: Shaft
- District: Ahmadsargurab
- Rural District: Ahmadsargurab

Population (2016)
  - Total: 654
- Time zone: UTC+3:30 (IRST)

Lepundan (Persian: لپوندان) (Note: Also romanized as Lepūndān; also known as Lapavandān, Lapuvandan, Lapūvandān, Lapvandān, and Lyapando) is a village in Ahmadsargurab Rural District of Ahmadsargurab District in Shaft County, Gilan province, Iran.

== Demographics ==
=== Population ===
At the time of the 2006 National Census, the village's population was 937 in 222 households. The following census in 2011 counted 865 people in 245 households. The 2016 census measured the population of the village as 654 people in 217 households.
