= Zowl Piran =

Village in Gilan province, Iran

Zowl Piran Persian: ذوالپيران
- Village
- Location within Iran
- Coordinates: 37°09′18″N 49°25′39″E
- Country: Iran
- Province: Gilan
- County: Shaft
- District: Central
- Rural District: Jirdeh

Population (2016)
  - Total: 730
- Time zone: UTC+3:30 (IRST)

Zowl Piran (Persian: ذوالپيران) (Note: Also romanized as Z̄owl Pīrān; also known as Davāl Pīrān) is a village in Jirdeh Rural District of the Central District in Shaft County, Gilan province, Iran.

== Demographics ==
=== Population ===
At the time of the 2006 National Census, the village's population was 723 in 173 households. The following census in 2011 counted 748 people in 229 households. The 2016 census measured the population of the village as 730 people in 246 households.
