= Chaqalvand Rud =

Chaqalvand Rud and Chaghalvand Rud (Persian: چغلوندرود) may refer to:

- Chaqalvand Rud-e Olya
- Chaqalvand Rud-e Sofla
