= Qaleh Gol, Gilan =

Qaleh Gol قلعه گل
- Village
- Location within Iran
- Coordinates: 37°05′02″N 49°25′34″E
- Country: Iran
- Province: Gilan
- County: Shaft
- Bakhsh: Ahmadsargurab
- Rural District: Chubar

Population (2006)
  - Total: 20
- Time zone: UTC+3:30 (IRST)
  - Summer (DST): UTC+4:30 (IRDT)

Qaleh Gol (Persian: قلعه گل, also Romanized as Qal‘eh Gol; also known as Qal‘eh Kol) is a village in Chubar Rural District, Ahmadsargurab District, Shaft County, Gilan Province, Iran. At the 2006 census, its population was 20, in 5 families.
