= Kish Khaleh, Shaft =

Kish Khaleh كيش خاله
- Village
- Location within Iran
- Coordinates: 37°01′26″N 49°24′34″E
- Country: Iran
- Province: Gilan
- County: Shaft
- Bakhsh: Ahmadsargurab
- Rural District: Chubar

Population (2006)
  - Total: 148
- Time zone: UTC+3:30 (IRST)
  - Summer (DST): UTC+4:30 (IRDT)

Kish Khaleh (Persian: كيش خاله, also Romanized as Kīsh Khāleh; also known as Kesh Khāleh) is a village in Chubar Rural District, Ahmadsargurab District, Shaft County, Gilan Province, Iran. At the 2006 census, its population was 148, in 42 families.
