= Garmabalah =

Garmabalah and Garmavaleh (Persian: گرمابله) may refer to:

- Garmabalah-ye Olya
- Garmabalah-ye Sofla
