= Shad Khal =

Village in Gilan province, Iran

Shad Khal Persian: شاهخال
- Village
- Location within Iran
- Coordinates: 37°12′25″N 49°26′41″E
- Country: Iran
- Province: Gilan
- County: Shaft
- District: Central
- Rural District: Molla Sara

Population (2016)
  - Total: 632
- Time zone: UTC+3:30 (IRST)

Shad Khal (Persian: شادخال) (Note: also romanized as Shād Khāl; formerly known as Shāh Khāl and Shākhāl) is a village in Molla Sara Rural District of the Central District in Shaft County, Gilan province, Iran.

== Demographics ==
=== Population ===
At the time of the 2006 National Census, the village's population was 822 in 193 households. The following census in 2011 counted 756 people in 235 households. The 2016 census measured the population of the village as 632 people in 219 households.
