= Dubakhshar =

Village in Gilan province, Iran

Dubakhshar Persian: دوبخشر
- Village
- Location within Iran
- Coordinates: 37°08′27″N 49°21′08″E
- Country: Iran
- Province: Gilan
- County: Shaft
- District: Ahmadsargurab
- Rural District: Ahmadsargurab

Population (2016)
  - Total: 786
- Time zone: UTC+3:30 (IRST)

Dubakhshar (Persian: دوبخشر) (Note: Also romanized as Dūbakhshar; also known as Dobakhshar and Dowbakhsh) is a village in Ahmadsargurab Rural District of Ahmadsargurab District in Shaft County, Gilan province, Iran.

== Demographics ==
=== Population ===
At the time of the 2006 National Census, the village's population was 983 in 253 households. The following census in 2011 counted 870 people in 288 households. The 2016 census measured the population of the village as 786 people in 290 households.
