= Taju =

Taju (Persian: تاجوي) may refer to:

- Taju-ye Sofla
- Taju-ye Vosta
