= Rasteh Kenar =

Rasteh Kenar (Persian: راسته كنار) may refer to:

- Rasteh Kenar, Fuman
- Rasteh Kenar, Rasht
- Rasteh Kenar, Shaft
- Rasteh Kenar, Khomam, Rasht County
- Rasteh Kenar, Sowme'eh Sara
