= Shad Neshin =

Shad Neshin شادنشين
- Village
- Location within Iran
- Coordinates: 37°05′13″N 49°23′51″E
- Country: Iran
- Province: Gilan
- County: Shaft
- Bakhsh: Ahmadsargurab
- Rural District: Chubar

Population (2006)
  - Total: 309
- Time zone: UTC+3:30 (IRST)
  - Summer (DST): UTC+4:30 (IRDT)

Shad Neshin (Persian: شادنشين, also Romanized as Shād Neshīn; also known as Shāh Neshīn) is a village in Chubar Rural District, Ahmadsargurab District, Shaft County, Gilan Province, Iran.

== Demographics ==
At the 2006 census, its population was 309, in 84 families.
