= Shaldeh =

Shaldeh (Persian: شالده) may refer to:

- Shaldeh, Fuman
- Shaldeh, Shaft
