= Qabr-e Ramezan =

Qabr-e Ramezan قبررمضان
- Village
- Location within Iran
- Coordinates: 33°29′54″N 48°50′20″E
- Country: Iran
- Province: Lorestan
- County: Khorramabad
- Bakhsh: Zagheh
- Rural District: Qaedrahmat

Population (2006)
  - Total: 131
- Time zone: UTC+3:30 (IRST)
  - Summer (DST): UTC+4:30 (IRDT)

Qabr-e Ramezan (Persian: قبررمضان, also Romanized as Qabr-e Rameẕān) is a village in Qaedrahmat Rural District, Zagheh District, Khorramabad County, Lorestan Province, Iran. At the 2006 census, its population was 131, in 33 families.
