= Chaku Sar =

Village in Gilan province, Iran

Chaku Sar Persian: چكوسر
- Village
- Location within Iran
- Coordinates: 37°12′15″N 49°26′02″E
- Country: Iran
- Province: Gilan
- County: Shaft
- District: Central
- Rural District: Molla Sara

Population (2016)
  - Total: 787
- Time zone: UTC+3:30 (IRST)

Chaku Sar (Persian: چكوسر) (Note: Also romanized as Chakū Sar, Chekūsar, and Chokūsar; also known as Chukuser) is a village in Molla Sara Rural District of the Central District in Shaft County, Gilan province, Iran.

== Demographics ==
=== Population ===
At the time of the 2006 National Census, the village's population was 961 in 262 households. The following census in 2011 counted 862 people in 259 households. The 2016 census measured the population of the village as 787 people in 265 households.
