= Markhal =

Village in Gilan province, Iran

Markhal Persian: مرخال
- Village
- Location within Iran
- Coordinates: 37°13′58″N 49°26′26″E
- Country: Iran
- Province: Gilan
- County: Shaft
- District: Central
- Rural District: Molla Sara

Population (2016)
  - Total: 547
- Time zone: UTC+3:30 (IRST)

Markhal (Persian: مرخال) (Note: Also romanized as Markhāl) is a village in Molla Sara Rural District of the Central District in Shaft County, Gilan province, Iran.

== Demographics ==
=== Population ===
At the time of the 2006 National Census, the village's population was 730 in 183 households. The following census in 2011 counted 616 people in 181 households. The 2016 census measured the population of the village as 547 people in 190 households.
