= Mazgi =

Mazgi (Persian: مزگي) may refer to:

- Sefid Mazgi ("White Mazgi")
- Siah Mazgi ("Black Mazgi")
