= Khatiban, Shaft =

Khatiban خطيبان
- Village
- Location within Iran
- Coordinates: 37°09′24″N 49°27′59″E
- Country: Iran
- Province: Gilan
- County: Shaft
- Bakhsh: Central
- Rural District: Jirdeh

Population (2006)
  - Total: 419
- Time zone: UTC+3:30 (IRST)
  - Summer (DST): UTC+4:30 (IRDT)

Khatiban (Persian: خطيبان, also Romanized as Khaţībān) is a village in Jirdeh Rural District, in the Central District of Shaft County, Gilan Province, Iran. At the 2006 census, its population was 419, in 108 families.
