= Nasir Mahalleh =

Village in Gilan province, Iran

Nasir Mahalleh Persian: نصير محله
- Village
- Location within Iran
- Coordinates: 37°07′15″N 49°20′49″E
- Country: Iran
- Province: Gilan
- County: Shaft
- District: Ahmadsargurab
- Rural District: Ahmadsargurab

Population (2016)
  - Total: 2,700
- Time zone: UTC+3:30 (IRST)

Nasir Mahalleh (Persian: نصيرمحله) (Note: Also romanized as Naşīr Maḩalleh; also known as Nasir-Magala) is a village in, and the capital of, Ahmadsargurab Rural District in Ahmadsargurab District of Shaft County, Gilan province, Iran.

== Demographics ==
=== Population ===
At the time of the 2006 National Census, the village's population was 3,090 in 802 households. The following census in 2011 counted 3,124 people in 863 households. The 2016 census measured the population of the village as 2,700 people in 894 households. It was the most populous village in its rural district.
