= Koleh Jub-e Sofla =

Koleh Jub-e Sofla or Kolah Jub-e Sofla (Persian: كله جوب سفلي) may refer to:

- Kolah Jub-e Sofla, Kermanshah
- Koleh Jub-e Sofla, Lorestan
- Kalleh Jub, Zagheh
