= Qassab Mahalleh, Shaft =

Qassab Mahalleh قصاب محله
- Village
- Location within Iran
- Coordinates: 37°08′35″N 49°25′31″E
- Country: Iran
- Province: Gilan
- County: Shaft
- Bakhsh: Central
- Rural District: Jirdeh

Population (2006)
  - Total: 197
- Time zone: UTC+3:30 (IRST)
  - Summer (DST): UTC+4:30 (IRDT)

Qassab Mahalleh (Persian: قصاب محله, also Romanized as Qaşşāb Maḩalleh) is a village in Jirdeh Rural District, in the Central District of Shaft County, Gilan Province, Iran. At the 2006 census, its population was 197, in 45 families.
