= Mirsara =

Village in Gilan province, Iran

Mirsara Persian: ميرسرا
- Village
- Location within Iran
- Coordinates: 37°06′45″N 49°24′54″E
- Country: Iran
- Province: Gilan
- County: Shaft
- District: Ahmadsargurab
- Rural District: Chubar

Population (2016)
  - Total: 459
- Time zone: UTC+3:30 (IRST)

Mirsara (Persian: ميرسرا) (Note: Also romanized as Mīrsarā and Mīrserā; also known as Aḩmad Sar Gūrāb and Aḩmad Sarā) is a village in Chubar Rural District of Ahmadsargurab District in Shaft County, Gilan province, Iran.

== Demographics ==
=== Population ===
At the time of the 2006 National Census, the village's population was 549 in 157 households. The following census in 2011 counted 550 people in 169 households. The 2016 census measured the population of the village as 459 people in 159 households.
