= Kuchak Kumsar =

Kuchak Kumsar كوچك كومسار
- Village
- Location within Iran
- Coordinates: 37°07′22″N 49°26′43″E
- Country: Iran
- Province: Gilan
- County: Shaft
- Bakhsh: Ahmadsargurab
- Rural District: Chubar

Population (2006)
  - Total: 190
- Time zone: UTC+3:30 (IRST)
  - Summer (DST): UTC+4:30 (IRDT)

Kuchak Kumsar (Persian: كوچك كومسار, also Romanized as Kūchak Kūmsār; also known as Kūchak Komsār and Kūchek Komsār) is a village in Chubar Rural District, Ahmadsargurab District, Shaft County, Gilan Province, Iran. At the 2006 census, its population was 190, in 51 families.
