= Dorudkhan =

Village in Gilan province, Iran

Dorudkhan Persian: درودخان
- Village
- Location within Iran
- Coordinates: 37°01′21″N 49°20′36″E
- Country: Iran
- Province: Gilan
- County: Shaft
- District: Ahmadsargurab
- Rural District: Chubar

Population (2016)
  - Total: 613
- Time zone: UTC+3:30 (IRST)

Dorudkhan (Persian: درودخان) (Note: Also romanized as Dorūdkhān) is a village in Chubar Rural District of Ahmadsargurab District in Shaft County, Gilan province, Iran.

== Demographics ==
=== Population ===
At the time of the 2006 National Census, the village's population was 737 in 205 households. The following census in 2011 counted 639 people in 189 households. The 2016 census measured the population of the village as 613 people in 214 households.
