= Khalilan, Gilan =

Khalilan خليلان
- Village
- Location within Iran
- Coordinates: 37°08′22″N 49°31′32″E
- Country: Iran
- Province: Gilan
- County: Shaft
- Bakhsh: Central
- Rural District: Jirdeh

Population (2006)
  - Total: 463
- Time zone: UTC+3:30 (IRST)
  - Summer (DST): UTC+4:30 (IRDT)

Khalilan (Persian: خليلان, also Romanized as Khalīlān and Khalilyan; Khalīlān-e Varzal) is a village in Jirdeh Rural District, in the Central District of Shaft County, Gilan Province, Iran. At the 2006 census, its population was 463, in 110 families.
