= Hajat =

Hajat may refer to:

- Rafiq Hajat, Malawian civil rights activist
- Hajat, Iran, a village in Kerman Province, Iran
- Hajat, Lorestan, a village in Lorestan Province, Iran
