= Bijar Sar =

Village in Gilan province, Iran

Bijar Sar Persian: بيجارسر
- Village
- Location within Iran
- Coordinates: 37°04′49″N 49°22′31″E
- Country: Iran
- Province: Gilan
- County: Shaft
- District: Ahmadsargurab
- Rural District: Chubar

Population (2016)
  - Total: 459
- Time zone: UTC+3:30 (IRST)

Bijar Sar (Persian: بيجارسر) (Note: Also romanized as Bījār Sar; also known as Bodzhyarser, Bojār Sar, and Bojiarser) is a village in Chubar Rural District of Ahmadsargurab District in Shaft County, Gilan province, Iran.

== Demographics ==
=== Population ===
At the time of the 2006 National Census, the village's population was 512 in 141 households. The following census in 2011 counted 453 people in 139 households. The 2016 census measured the population of the village as 459 people in 161 households.
