= Seyqalan, Shaft =

Seyqalan صيقلان
- Village
- Location within Iran
- Coordinates: 37°08′05″N 49°26′17″E
- Country: Iran
- Province: Gilan
- County: Shaft
- Bakhsh: Ahmadsargurab
- Rural District: Chubar

Population (2006)
  - Total: 570
- Time zone: UTC+3:30 (IRST)
  - Summer (DST): UTC+4:30 (IRDT)

Seyqalan (Persian: صيقلان, also Romanized as Şeyqalān; also known as Segelān and Segelyan) is a village in Chubar Rural District, Ahmadsargurab District, Shaft County, Gilan Province, Iran. At the 2006 census, its population was 570, in 137 families.
