= Ganjar, Iran =

Village in Gilan province, Iran

Ganjar Persian: گنجار
- Village
- Location within Iran
- Country: Iran
- Province: Gilan
- County: Shaft
- District: Ahmadsargurab
- Rural District: Ahmadsargurab

Population (2016)
  - Total: 649
- Time zone: UTC+3:30 (IRST)

Ganjar (Persian: گنجار) (Note: Also romanized as Ganjār) is a village in Ahmadsargurab Rural District of Ahmadsargurab District in Shaft County, Gilan province, Iran.

== Demographics ==
=== Population ===
At the time of the 2006 National Census, the village's population was 780 in 185 households. The following census in 2011 counted 726 people in 203 households. The 2016 census measured the population of the village as 649 people in 211 households.
