= Molla Sara =

Molla Sara (Persian: ملاسرا) may refer to:

- Molla Sara, Rasht
- Molla Sara, Shaft
- Molla Sara, Sowme'eh Sara
- Molla Sara Rural District, in Shaft County
