= Seyl Kabud =

Seyl Kabud سيل كبود
- Village
- Location within Iran
- Coordinates: 33°33′18″N 48°39′08″E
- Country: Iran
- Province: Lorestan
- County: Khorramabad
- Bakhsh: Zagheh
- Rural District: Zagheh

Population (2006)
  - Total: 51
- Time zone: UTC+3:30 (IRST)
  - Summer (DST): UTC+4:30 (IRDT)

Seyl Kabud (Persian: سيل كبود, also Romanized as Seyl Kabūd and Sīl Kabūd; also known as Kabood Lar, Kabūdas, Kabūdath, and Kabūdlar) is a village in Zagheh Rural District, Zagheh District, Khorramabad County, Lorestan Province, Iran. At the 2006 census, its population was 51, in 12 families.
