= Nehzom-e Seyqal Kumeh =

Village in Gilan province, Iran

Nehzom-e Seyqal Kumeh Persian: نهزم صيقل كومه
- Village
- Location within Iran
- Coordinates: 37°08′28″N 49°26′05″E
- Country: Iran
- Province: Gilan
- County: Shaft
- District: Central
- Rural District: Jirdeh

Population (2016)
  - Total: 502
- Time zone: UTC+3:30 (IRST)

Nehzom-e Seyqal Kumeh (Persian: نهزم صيقل كومه) (Note: Also romanized as Nehzom-e Şeyqal Kūmeh; also known as Nehzom) is a village in Jirdeh Rural District of the Central District in Shaft County, Gilan province, Iran.

== Demographics ==
=== Population ===
At the time of the 2006 National Census, the village's population was 593 in 138 households. The following census in 2011 counted 550 people in 160 households. The 2016 census measured the population of the village as 502 people in 170 households.
