= Emamzadeh Ebrahim, Gilan =

Village in Gilan province, Iran

Emamzadeh Ebrahim Persian: امامزاده ابراهيم
- Village
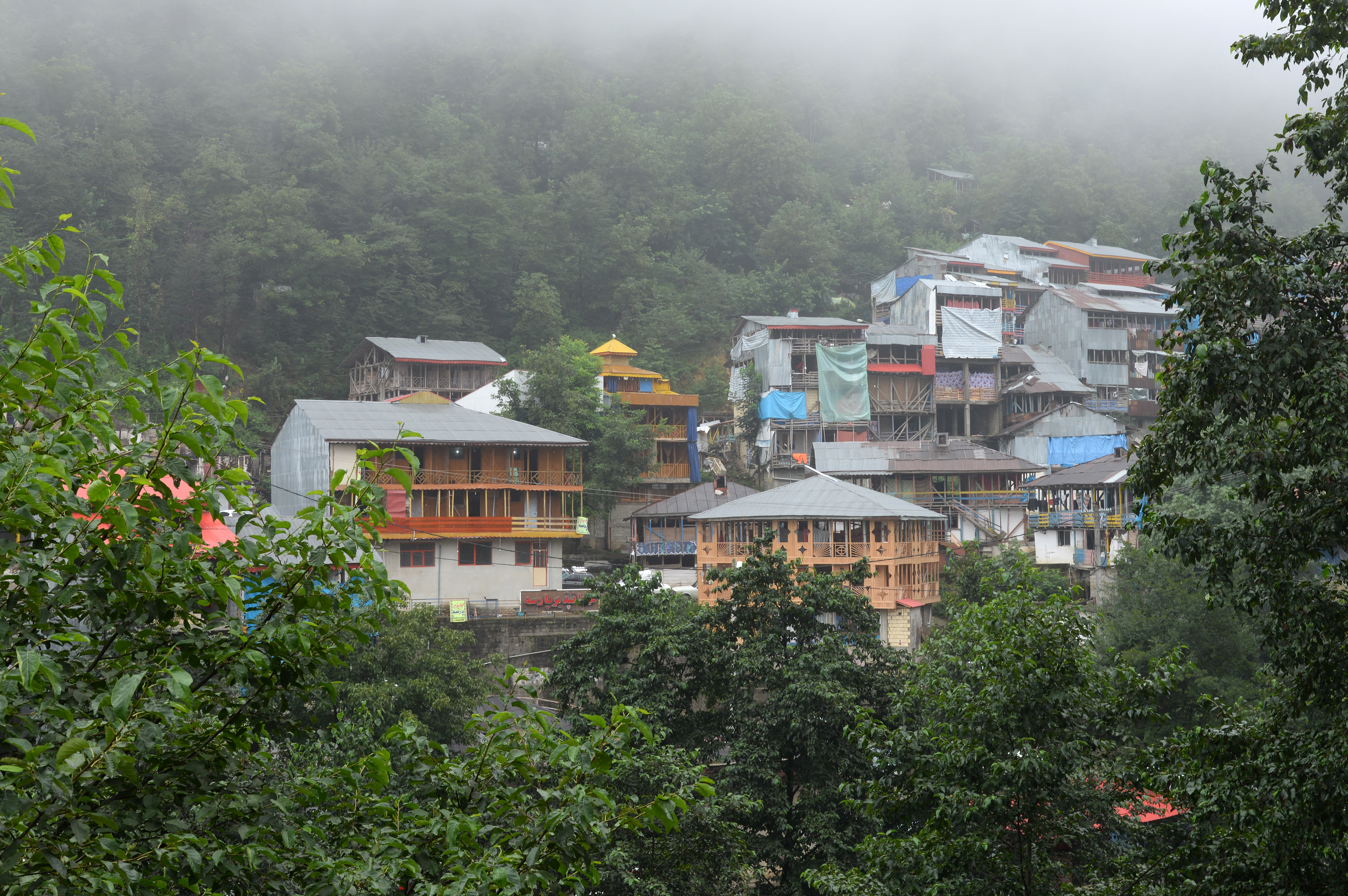
- The village of Emamzadeh Ebrahim

- Location within Iran
- Coordinates: 36°58′53″N 49°18′40″E
- Country: Iran
- Province: Gilan
- County: Shaft
- District: Ahmadsargurab
- Rural District: Chubar

Population (2016)
  - Total: 432
- Time zone: UTC+3:30 (IRST)

Emamzadeh Ebrahim (Persian: امامزاده ابراهيم) (Note: Also romanized as Emāmzādeh Ebrāhīm) is a village in Chubar Rural District of Ahmadsargurab District in Shaft County, Gilan province, Iran.

== Demographics ==
=== Population ===
At the time of the 2006 National Census, the village's population was 310 in 94 households. The following census in 2011 counted 346 people in 105 households. The 2016 census measured the population of the village as 432 people in 158 households.

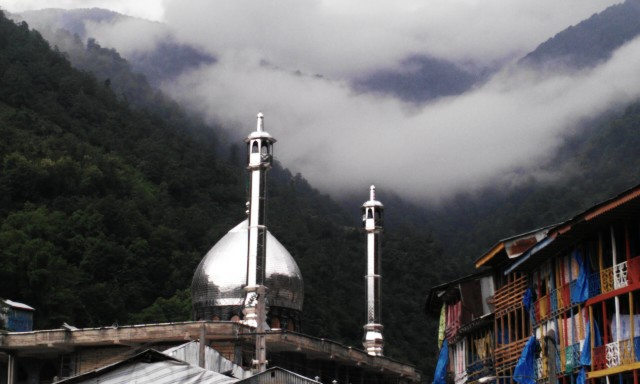
