= Farah Kosh =

Farah Kosh or Farah Kash or Farakash (Persian: فره کش) may refer to:

- Farah Kosh-e Olya
- Farah Kosh-e Sofla
