= Khortum =

Village in Gilan province, Iran

Khortum Persian: خرطوم
- Village
- Location within Iran
- Coordinates: 37°08′04″N 49°29′44″E
- Country: Iran
- Province: Gilan
- County: Shaft
- District: Central
- Rural District: Jirdeh

Population (2016)
  - Total: 692
- Time zone: UTC+3:30 (IRST)

Khortum (Persian: خرطوم) (Note: Also romanized as Khortoom and Khorţūm; also known as Bālā Maḩalleh-ye Khorţūm, and Hortum) is a village in Jirdeh Rural District of the Central District in Shaft County, Gilan province, Iran.

== Demographics ==
=== Population ===
At the time of the 2006 National Census, the village's population was 783 in 200 households. The following census in 2011 counted 824 people in 235 households. The 2016 census measured the population of the village as 692 people in 232 households.
