= Mashatuk =

Village in Gilan province, Iran

Mashatuk Persian: ماشاتوك
- Village
- Location within Iran
- Coordinates: 37°16′42″N 49°28′25″E
- Country: Iran
- Province: Gilan
- County: Shaft
- District: Central
- Rural District: Molla Sara

Population (2016)
  - Total: 729
- Time zone: UTC+3:30 (IRST)

Mashatuk (Persian: ماشاتوك) (Note: Also romanized as Māshātūk; also known as Mashtik and Meshtyk) is a village in Molla Sara Rural District of the Central District in Shaft County, Gilan province, Iran.

== Demographics ==
=== Population ===
At the time of the 2006 National Census, the village's population was 753 in 199 households. The following census in 2011 counted 786 people in 254 households. The 2016 census measured the population of the village as 729 people in 240 households.
