= Shalma, Shaft =

Village in Gilan province, Iran

Shalma Persian: شالما
- Village
- Location within Iran
- Coordinates: 37°06′39″N 49°19′43″E
- Country: Iran
- Province: Gilan
- County: Shaft
- District: Ahmadsargurab
- Rural District: Ahmadsargurab

Population (2016)
  - Total: 810
- Time zone: UTC+3:30 (IRST)

Shalma (Persian: شالما) (Note: Also romanized as Shālmā) is a village in Ahmadsargurab Rural District of Ahmadsargurab District in Shaft County, Gilan province, Iran.

== Demographics ==
=== Population ===
At the time of the 2006 National Census, the village's population was 996 in 265 households. The following census in 2011 counted 892 people in 255 households. The 2016 census measured the population of the village as 810 people in 260 households.
