= Palangposht =

Village in Gilan province, Iran

Palangposht Persian: پلنگپشت
- Village
- Location within Iran
- Coordinates: 37°05′53″N 49°24′05″E
- Country: Iran
- Province: Gilan
- County: Shaft
- District: Ahmadsargurab
- Rural District: Chubar

Population (2016)
  - Total: 420
- Time zone: UTC+3:30 (IRST)

Palangposht (Persian: پلنگپشت) is a village in Chubar Rural District of Ahmadsargurab District in Shaft County, Gilan province, Iran.

== Demographics ==
=== Population ===
At the time of the 2006 National Census, the village's population was 417 in 118 households. The following census in 2011 counted 421 people in 129 households. The 2016 census measured the population of the village as 420 people in 152 households.
