= Ali Sara, Shaft =

Village in Gilan province, Iran

Ali Sara Persian: عليسرا
- Village
- Location within Iran
- Coordinates: 37°02′53″N 49°17′20″E
- Country: Iran
- Province: Gilan
- County: Shaft
- District: Ahmadsargurab
- Rural District: Ahmadsargurab

Population (2016)
  - Total: 532
- Time zone: UTC+3:30 (IRST)

Ali Sara (Persian: عليسرا) (Note: Also romanized as ‘Alī Sarā) is a village in Ahmadsargurab Rural District of Ahmadsargurab District in Shaft County, Gilan province, Iran.

== Demographics ==
=== Population ===
At the time of the 2006 National Census, the village's population was 952 in 232 households. The following census in 2011 counted 713 people in 223 households. The 2016 census measured the population of the village as 532 people in 180 households.
