= Rasteh Kenar, Shaft =

Rasteh Kenar راسته كنار
- Village
- Location within Iran
- Coordinates: 37°17′32″N 49°27′00″E
- Country: Iran
- Province: Gilan
- County: Shaft
- Bakhsh: Central
- Rural District: Molla Sara

Population (2006)
  - Total: 495
- Time zone: UTC+3:30 (IRST)
  - Summer (DST): UTC+4:30 (IRDT)

Rasteh Kenar (Persian: راسته كنار, also Romanized as Rāsteh Kenār; also known as Rāsteh Kenār-e Pasīkhān) is a village in Molla Sara Rural District, in the Central District of Shaft County, Gilan Province, Iran. At the 2006 census, its population was 495, in 133 families.
