= Lifkuh =

Village in Gilan province, Iran

Lifkuh Persian: ليفكوه
- Village
- Location within Iran
- Coordinates: 37°06′27″N 49°27′19″E
- Country: Iran
- Province: Gilan
- County: Shaft
- District: Ahmadsargurab
- Rural District: Chubar

Population (2016)
  - Total: 450
- Time zone: UTC+3:30 (IRST)

Lifkuh (Persian: ليفكوه) (Note: Also romanized as Līfkūh; also known as Līfkū Khandān) is a village in Chubar Rural District of Ahmadsargurab District in Shaft County, Gilan province, Iran.

== Demographics ==
=== Population ===
At the time of the 2006 National Census, the village's population was 571 in 142 households. The following census in 2011 counted 471 people in 143 households. The 2016 census measured the population of the village as 450 people in 148 households.
