= Aqaseyyed Yaqub =

Village in Gilan province, Iran

Aqaseyyed Yaqub Persian: اقاسيديعقوب
- Village
- Location within Iran
- Coordinates: 37°16′11″N 49°26′20″E
- Country: Iran
- Province: Gilan
- County: Shaft
- District: Central
- Rural District: Molla Sara

Population (2016)
  - Total: 831
- Time zone: UTC+3:30 (IRST)

Aqaseyyed Yaqub (Persian: اقاسيديعقوب) (Note: Also romanized as Āqāseyyed Yaʿqūb) is a village in Molla Sara Rural District of the Central District in Shaft County, Gilan province, Iran.

== Demographics ==
=== Population ===
At the time of the 2006 National Census, the village's population was 1,119 in 297 households. The following census in 2011 counted 731 people in 228 households. The 2016 census measured the population of the village as 831 people in 256 households.
