= Razan (disambiguation) =

Razan is a city in Hamadan Province, Iran.

Razan (Persian: رازان or رزان or رزن) may also refer to:

- Razan, Lorestan, a village
- Razan, Markazi, a village
- Razan, Amol, a village in Mazandaran province
- Razan, Chalus, a village in Mazandaran province
- Razan, Nur, a village in Mazandaran province
- Razan, Qazvin, a village
- Razan, Razavi Khorasan, a village
- Razan County
- Razan Rural District (Razan County), Hamadan province
- Razan Rural District (Khorramabad County), Lorestan province
- Razan, Afghanistan, a village in Afghanistan
