= Bedab =

Village in Gilan province, Iran

Bedab Persian: بداب
- Village
- Location within Iran
- Coordinates: 37°08′14″N 49°23′35″E
- Country: Iran
- Province: Gilan
- County: Shaft
- District: Ahmadsargurab
- Rural District: Ahmadsargurab

Population (2016)
  - Total: 547
- Time zone: UTC+3:30 (IRST)

Bedab (Persian: بداب) (Note: Also romanized as Bedāb) is a village in Ahmadsargurab Rural District of Ahmadsargurab District in Shaft County, Gilan province, Iran.

== Demographics ==
=== Population ===
At the time of the 2006 National Census, the village's population was 810 in 219 households. The following census in 2011 counted 562 people in 180 households. The 2016 census measured the population of the village as 547 people in 197 households.
