= Kuzehgaran =

Kuzehgaran or Kuzeh Garan (Persian: كوزه گران) may refer to:

- Kuzeh Garan, Gilan
- Kuzehgaran, Kermanshah
- Kuzehgaran, West Azerbaijan
