= Bagh-e Pasham =

Village in Lorestan province, Iran

Bagh-e Pasham Persian: باغ پشم
- Village
- Location within Iran
- Coordinates: 33°31′34″N 48°50′46″E
- Country: Iran
- Province: Lorestan
- County: Khorramabad
- District: Zagheh
- Rural District: Razan

Population (2016)
  - Total: 53
- Time zone: UTC+3:30 (IRST)

Bagh-e Pasham (Persian: باغ پشم) (Note: Also romanized as Bāgh-e Pasham) is a village in Razan Rural District of Zagheh District in Khorramabad County, Lorestan province, Iran.

== Demographics ==
=== Population ===
At the time of the 2006 National Census, the village's population was 70 in 19 households. The 2016 census measured the population of the village as 53 people in 16 households.
