= Zardabad, Lorestan =

Village in Lorestan province, Iran

Zardabad Persian: زرداباد
- Village
- Location within Iran
- Coordinates: 33°29′30″N 48°34′14″E
- Country: Iran
- Province: Lorestan
- County: Khorramabad
- District: Zagheh
- Rural District: Zagheh

Population (2016)
  - Total: 338
- Time zone: UTC+3:30 (IRST)

Zardabad (Persian: زرداباد) (Note: Also romanized as Zardābād) is a village in Zagheh Rural District of Zagheh District in Khorramabad County, Lorestan province, Iran.

== Demographics ==
=== Population ===
At the time of the 2006 National Census, the village's population was 335 in 71 households. The following census in 2011 counted 313 people in 87 households. The 2016 census measured the population of the village as 338 people in 104 households.
