= Kalashem-e Bala =

Village in Gilan province, Iran

Kalashem-e Bala Persian: كلاشم بالا
- Village
- Location within Iran
- Coordinates: 37°16′25″N 49°24′51″E
- Country: Iran
- Province: Gilan
- County: Shaft
- District: Central
- Rural District: Molla Sara

Population (2016)
  - Total: 1,732
- Time zone: UTC+3:30 (IRST)

Kalashem-e Bala (Persian: كلاشم بالا) (Note: Also romanized as Kalāshem-e Bālā and Kalāshom-e Bālā; also known as Kalashem, Kalāshom, Kalāshom-e Pā’īn, and Qalashem) is a village in Molla Sara Rural District of the Central District in Shaft County, Gilan province, Iran.

== Demographics ==
=== Population ===
At the time of the 2006 National Census, the village's population was 1,928 in 523 households. The following census in 2011 counted 2,058 people in 633 households. The 2016 census measured the population of the village as 1,732 people in 595 households. It was the most populous village in its rural district.
