= Sefid Mazgi =

Village in Gilan province, Iran

Sefid Mazgi Persian: سفيدمزگي
- Village
- Location within Iran
- Coordinates: 37°06′12″N 49°19′14″E
- Country: Iran
- Province: Gilan
- County: Shaft
- District: Ahmadsargurab
- Rural District: Ahmadsargurab

Population (2016)
  - Total: 646
- Time zone: UTC+3:30 (IRST)

Sefid Mazgi (Persian: سفيدمزگي) (Note: Also romanized as Sefīd Mazgī) is a village in Ahmadsargurab Rural District of Ahmadsargurab District in Shaft County, Gilan province, Iran.

== Demographics ==
=== Population ===
At the time of the 2006 National Census, the village's population was 949 in 229 households. The following census in 2011 counted 789 people in 213 households. The 2016 census measured the population of the village as 646 people in 201 households.
