= Pirdeh =

Pirdeh or Pir Deh (Persian: پيرده) may refer to:

- Pir Deh, Gilan
- Pir Deh, Shaft, Gilan Province
- Pirdeh, Tehran
