= Razan Rural District =

Razan Rural District (Persian: دهستان رازان) may refer to:

- Razan Rural District (Hamadan Province)
- Razan Rural District (Lorestan Province)
