= Eyvashan Seyl =

Village in Lorestan province, Iran

Eyvashan Seyl Persian: عيوشان سيل
- Village
- Location within Iran
- Coordinates: 33°28′50″N 48°48′54″E
- Country: Iran
- Province: Lorestan
- County: Khorramabad
- District: Zagheh
- Rural District: Razan

Population (2016)
  - Total: 88
- Time zone: UTC+3:30 (IRST)

Eyvashan Seyl (Persian: عيوشان سيل) (Note: Also romanized as ‘Eyvashān Seyl and ‘Eyvashān Sīl; also known as ‘Eyvashān, Eyvashūn, ‘Eyveshān-e Golestān, and Yebāsūn) is a village in Razan Rural District of Zagheh District in Khorramabad County, Lorestan province, Iran.

== Demographics ==
=== Population ===
At the time of the 2006 National Census, the village's population was 223 in 43 households. The following census in 2011 counted 65 people in 14 households. The 2016 census measured the population of the village as 88 people in 26 households.
