= Haft Cheshmeh, Khorramabad =

Village in Lorestan province, Iran

Haft Cheshmeh Persian: هفت چشمه
- Village
- Location within Iran
- Coordinates: 33°31′17″N 48°47′14″E
- Country: Iran
- Province: Lorestan
- County: Khorramabad
- District: Zagheh
- Rural District: Qaedrahmat

Population (2016)
  - Total: 228
- Time zone: UTC+3:30 (IRST)

Haft Cheshmeh (Persian: هفتچشمه) (Note: Also known as Āb Chashmeh) is a village in Qaedrahmat Rural District of Zagheh District in Khorramabad County, Lorestan province, Iran.

== Demographics ==
=== Population ===
At the time of the 2006 National Census, the village's population was 293 in 64 households. The following census in 2011 counted 219 people in 61 households. The 2016 census measured the population of the village as 228 people in 66 households.
