= Garmabalah-ye Sofla =

Garmabalah-ye Sofla گرمابله سفلي
- Village
- Location within Iran
- Coordinates: 33°30′50″N 48°32′21″E
- Country: Iran
- Province: Lorestan
- County: Khorramabad
- Bakhsh: Zagheh
- Rural District: Zagheh

Population (2006)
  - Total: 113
- Time zone: UTC+3:30 (IRST)
  - Summer (DST): UTC+4:30 (IRDT)

Garmabalah-ye Sofla (Persian: گرمابله سفلي, also Romanized as Garmābalah-ye Soflá and Garmāvaleh-ye Soflá) is a village in Zagheh Rural District, Zagheh District, Khorramabad County, Lorestan Province, Iran. At the 2006 census, its population was 113, in 24 families.
