= Zarrinabad, Lorestan =

Village in Lorestan province, Iran

Zarrinabad Persian: زرين اباد
- Village
- Location within Iran
- Coordinates: 33°29′51″N 48°47′13″E
- Country: Iran
- Province: Lorestan
- County: Khorramabad
- District: Zagheh
- Rural District: Qaedrahmat

Population (2016)
  - Total: 248
- Time zone: UTC+3:30 (IRST)

Zarrinabad (Persian: زرين اباد) (Note: Also romanized as Zarrīnābād; also known as Jārīābād) is a village in Qaedrahmat Rural District of Zagheh District in Khorramabad County, Lorestan province, Iran.

== Demographics ==
=== Population ===
At the time of the 2006 National Census, the village's population was 286 in 64 households. The following census in 2011 counted 276 people in 62 households. The 2016 census measured the population of the village as 248 people in 72 households.
