= Milmilak =

Village in Lorestan province, Iran

Milmilak Persian: ميل ميلك
- Village
- Location within Iran
- Coordinates: 33°29′40″N 48°35′45″E
- Country: Iran
- Province: Lorestan
- County: Khorramabad
- District: Zagheh
- Rural District: Zagheh

Population (2016)
  - Total: 252
- Time zone: UTC+3:30 (IRST)

Milmilak (Persian: ميل ميلك) (Note: Also romanized as Mīlmīlak) is a village in Zagheh Rural District of Zagheh District in Khorramabad County, Lorestan province, Iran.

== Demographics ==
=== Population ===
At the time of the 2006 National Census, the village's population was 257 in 53 households. The following census in 2011 counted 237 people in 55 households. The 2016 census measured the population of the village as 252 people in 74 households.
