= Rangrazan-e Vosta =

Rangrazan-e Vosta رنگرزان وسطي
- Village
- Location within Iran
- Coordinates: 33°32′39″N 48°47′55″E
- Country: Iran
- Province: Lorestan
- County: Khorramabad
- Bakhsh: Zagheh
- Rural District: Qaedrahmat

Population (2006)
  - Total: 170
- Time zone: UTC+3:30 (IRST)
  - Summer (DST): UTC+4:30 (IRDT)

Rangrazan-e Vosta (Persian: رنگرزان وسطي, also Romanized as Rangrazān-e Vosţá and Rangrazān-e Vasaţī) is a village in Qaedrahmat Rural District, Zagheh District, Khorramabad County, Lorestan Province, Iran. At the 2006 census, its population was 170, in 39 families.
