= Jir Mahalleh =

Jir Mahalleh (Persian: جيرمحله) may refer to:

- Jir Mahalleh, Shaft
- Jir Mahalleh, Sowme'eh Sara
