= Hajatan =

Hajatan حاجتان
- Village
- Location within Iran
- Coordinates: 33°29′42″N 48°50′03″E
- Country: Iran
- Province: Lorestan
- County: Khorramabad
- Bakhsh: Zagheh
- Rural District: Qaedrahmat

Population (2006)
  - Total: 156
- Time zone: UTC+3:30 (IRST)
  - Summer (DST): UTC+4:30 (IRDT)

Hajatan (Persian: حاجتان, also Romanized as Ḩājatān; also known as Ḩājat) is a village in Qaedrahmat Rural District, Zagheh District, Khorramabad County, Lorestan Province, Iran. At the 2006 census, its population was 156, in 31 families.
