= Qaleh-ye Jahan Bakhsh =

Qaleh-ye Jahan Bakhsh قلعه جهانبخش
- Village
- Location within Iran
- Coordinates: 33°33′01″N 48°42′28″E
- Country: Iran
- Province: Lorestan
- County: Khorramabad
- Bakhsh: Zagheh
- Rural District: Zagheh

Population (2006)
  - Total: 124
- Time zone: UTC+3:30 (IRST)
  - Summer (DST): UTC+4:30 (IRDT)

Qaleh-ye Jahan Bakhsh (Persian: قلعه جهانبخش, also Romanized as Qal‘eh-ye Jahān Bakhsh and Qal‘eh Jahānbakhsh; also known as Qal‘eh-ye Jahān and Jahānbakhsh) is a village in Zagheh Rural District, Zagheh District, Khorramabad County, Lorestan Province, Iran. At the 2006 census, its population was 124, in 27 families.
