= Farah Kosh-e Sofla =

Farah Kosh-e Sofla فره كش سفلي
- Village
- Location within Iran
- Coordinates: 33°30′04″N 48°40′56″E
- Country: Iran
- Province: Lorestan
- County: Khorramabad
- Bakhsh: Zagheh
- Rural District: Zagheh

Population (2006)
  - Total: 52
- Time zone: UTC+3:30 (IRST)
  - Summer (DST): UTC+4:30 (IRDT)

Farah Kosh-e Sofla (Persian: فره كش سفلي, also Romanized as Faraḩ Kosh-e Soflá and Faraḩ Kash-e Soflá) is a village in Zagheh Rural District, Zagheh District, Khorramabad County, Lorestan Province, Iran. At the 2006 census, its population was 52, with 12 families.
