= Shaldeh, Shaft =

Village in Gilan province, Iran

Shaldeh Persian: شالده
- Village
- Location within Iran
- Coordinates: 37°11′15″N 49°26′15″E
- Country: Iran
- Province: Gilan
- County: Shaft
- District: Central
- Rural District: Jirdeh

Population (2016)
  - Total: 1,046
- Time zone: UTC+3:30 (IRST)

Shaldeh (Persian: شالده) (Note: Also romanized as Shāldeh; also known as Shaldy) is a village in Jirdeh Rural District of the Central District in Shaft County, Gilan province, Iran.

== Demographics ==
=== Population ===
At the time of the 2006 National Census, the village's population was 1,188 in 288 households. The following census in 2011 counted 1,249 people in 339 households. The 2016 census measured the population of the village as 1,046 people in 349 households.
