= Abkot =

Village in Lorestan province, Iran

Abkot Persian: آب کت
- Village
- Location within Iran
- Coordinates: 33°33′04″N 48°54′51″E
- Country: Iran
- Province: Lorestan
- County: Khorramabad
- District: Zagheh
- Rural District: Razan

Population (2016)
  - Total: 74
- Time zone: UTC+3:30 (IRST)

Abkot (Persian: آب کت) (Note: Also romanized as Ābkot; also known as Āb Kot-e Pā’īn, Āb Kot-e Soflá, Āb-i-Kūt, Ābkowt-e Pā’īn, and Ābkūt-e Soflá) is a village in Razan Rural District of Zagheh District in Khorramabad County, Lorestan province, Iran.

== Demographics ==
=== Population ===
At the time of the 2006 National Census, the village's population was 72 in 14 households. The 2016 census measured the population of the village as 74 people in 18 households.
