= Yar Ali, Lorestan =

Village in Lorestan province, Iran

Yar Ali Persian: يارعلي
- Village
- Location within Iran
- Coordinates: 33°31′22″N 48°51′51″E
- Country: Iran
- Province: Lorestan
- County: Khorramabad
- District: Zagheh
- Rural District: Razan

Population (2016)
  - Total: 84
- Time zone: UTC+3:30 (IRST)

Yar Ali (Persian: يارعلي) (Note: Also romanized as Yār ‘Alī) is a village in Razan Rural District of Zagheh District in Khorramabad County, Lorestan province, Iran.

== Demographics ==
=== Population ===
At the time of the 2006 National Census, the village's population was 143 in 28 households. The following census in 2011 counted 25 people in seven households. The 2016 census measured the population of the village as 84 people in 22 households.
