= Kuchak Komsar =

Kuchak Komsar or Kuchek Komsar (Persian: كوچك كمسار) may refer to:

- Kuchak Komsar, Fuman
- Kuchak Komsar, Shaft
