= Yek Borji, Lorestan =

Yek Borji يك برجي
- Village
- Location within Iran
- Coordinates: 33°34′48″N 48°43′39″E
- Country: Iran
- Province: Lorestan
- County: Khorramabad
- Bakhsh: Zagheh
- Rural District: Qaedrahmat

Population (2006)
  - Total: 82
- Time zone: UTC+3:30 (IRST)
  - Summer (DST): UTC+4:30 (IRDT)

Yek Borji (Persian: يك برجي, also Romanized as Yek Borjī) is a village in Qaedrahmat Rural District, Zagheh District, Khorramabad County, Lorestan Province, Iran. At the 2006 census, its population was 13 families consisting of a total of 82 individuals.
