= Khalilan-e Olya =

Khalilan-e Olya (Persian: خليلان عليا) may refer to various villages in Iran:

- Khalilan-e Olya, Kermanshah
- Khalilan-e Olya, Lorestan
