= Khatiban =

Khatiban (Persian: خطيبان) may refer to:

- Khatiban, Shaft
- Khatiban, Sowme'eh Sara
