= Taju-ye Sofla =

Taju-ye Sofla تاجوي سفلي
- Village
- Location within Iran
- Coordinates: 33°32′47″N 48°41′03″E
- Country: Iran
- Province: Lorestan
- County: Khorramabad
- Bakhsh: Zagheh
- Rural District: Zagheh

Population (2006)
  - Total: 83
- Time zone: UTC+3:30 (IRST)
  - Summer (DST): UTC+4:30 (IRDT)

Taju-ye Sofla (Persian: تاجوي سفلي, also Romanized as Tājū-ye Soflá; also known as Tajusofla) is a village in Zagheh Rural District, Zagheh District, Khorramabad County, Lorestan Province, Iran. At the 2006 census, its population was 83, in 14 families.
