= Qaleh-ye Ali, Lorestan =

Village in Lorestan province, Iran

Qaleh-ye Ali Persian: قلعه علي
- Village
- Location within Iran
- Coordinates: 33°32′39″N 48°42′41″E
- Country: Iran
- Province: Lorestan
- County: Khorramabad
- District: Zagheh
- Rural District: Zagheh

Population (2016)
  - Total: 282
- Time zone: UTC+3:30 (IRST)

Qaleh-ye Ali (Persian: قلعه علي) (Note: Also romanized as Qal‘eh ‘Alī and Qal‘eh-ye ‘Alī; also known as Qal‘eh-ye Ḩājjī ‘Alī) is a village in Zagheh Rural District of Zagheh District in Khorramabad County, Lorestan province, Iran.

== Demographics ==
=== Population ===
At the time of the 2006 National Census, the village's population was 327 in 73 households. The following census in 2011 counted 311 people in 82 households. The 2016 census measured the population of the village as 282 people in 91 households.
