= Taleqan, Khorramabad =

Village in Lorestan province, Iran

Taleqan Persian: طالقان
- Village
- Location within Iran
- Coordinates: 33°29′20″N 48°36′27″E
- Country: Iran
- Province: Lorestan
- County: Khorramabad
- District: Zagheh
- Rural District: Zagheh

Population (2016)
  - Total: 429
- Time zone: UTC+3:30 (IRST)

Taleqan (Persian: طالقان) (Note: Also romanized as Ţāleqān; formerly known as Dangi-ye Akbarabad (دانگي اكبراباد), also romanized as Dāngī-ye Akbarābād; also known as Dānakī, Dūnkī, and Ţāleqānī) is a village in Zagheh Rural District of Zagheh District in Khorramabad County, Lorestan province, Iran.

== Demographics ==
=== Population ===
At the time of the 2006 National Census, the village's population, as Dangi-ye Akbarabad, was 622 in 135 households. The following census in 2011 counted 572 people in 152 households, by which time the village was listed as Taleqan. The 2016 census measured the population of the village as 429 people in 114 households.
