= Jirdeh-e Pasikhan =

Village in Gilan province, Iran

Jirdeh-e Pasikhan Persian: جيرده پسيخان
- Village
- Location within Iran
- Coordinates: 37°16′12″N 49°27′59″E
- Country: Iran
- Province: Gilan
- County: Shaft
- District: Central
- Rural District: Molla Sara

Population (2016)
  - Total: 598
- Time zone: UTC+3:30 (IRST)

Jirdeh-e Pasikhan (Persian: جيرده پسيخان) (Note: Also romanized as Jīrdeh-e Pasīkhān; also known as Pasīkhān) is a village in Molla Sara Rural District of the Central District in Shaft County, Gilan province, Iran.

== Demographics ==
=== Population ===
At the time of the 2006 National Census, the village's population was 664 in 176 households. The following census in 2011 counted 476 people in 158 households. The 2016 census measured the population of the village as 598 people in 193 households.
