= Meleh Sorkheh =

Village in Lorestan province, Iran

Meleh Sorkheh Persian: مله سرخه
- Village
- Location within Iran
- Coordinates: 33°34′02″N 48°55′42″E
- Country: Iran
- Province: Lorestan
- County: Khorramabad
- District: Zagheh
- Rural District: Razan

Population (2016)
  - Total: 21
- Time zone: UTC+3:30 (IRST)

Meleh Sorkheh (Persian: مله سرخه) (Note: Also known as Meleh Sūkhteh and Milleh Surkha) is a village in Razan Rural District of Zagheh District in Khorramabad County, Lorestan province, Iran.

== Demographics ==
=== Population ===
At the time of the 2006 National Census, the village's population was 27 in seven households. The 2016 census measured the population of the village as 21 people in six households.
