= Pol Haru =

Village in Lorestan province, Iran

Pol Haru Persian: پل هرو
- Village
- Location within Iran
- Coordinates: 33°31′18″N 48°46′29″E
- Country: Iran
- Province: Lorestan
- County: Khorramabad
- District: Zagheh
- Rural District: Qaedrahmat

Population (2016)
  - Total: 411
- Time zone: UTC+3:30 (IRST)

Pol Haru (Persian: پل هرو) (Note: Also romanized as Pol Harū; also known as Seyāh Gūshī, Sīā Gūshī, Sīāh Gūshī (سياه گوشي), and Sīāh Kushi) is a village in, and the capital of, Qaedrahmat Rural District in Zagheh District of Khorramabad County, Lorestan province, Iran.

== Demographics ==
=== Population ===
At the time of the 2006 National Census, the village's population was 308 in 76 households. The following census in 2011 counted 412 people in 123 households. The 2016 census measured the population of the village as 411 people in 114 households.
