= Molla Sara, Shaft =

Village in Gilan province, Iran

Molla Sara Persian: ملاسرا
- Village
- Location within Iran
- Coordinates: 37°16′09″N 49°27′13″E
- Country: Iran
- Province: Gilan
- County: Shaft
- District: Central
- Rural District: Molla Sara

Population (2016)
  - Total: 1,561
- Time zone: UTC+3:30 (IRST)

Molla Sara (Persian: ملاسرا) (Note: Also romanized as Mollā Sarā) is a village in, and the capital of, Molla Sara Rural District in the Central District of Shaft County, Gilan province, Iran.

== Demographics ==
=== Population ===
At the time of the 2006 National Census, the village's population was 1,403 in 372 households. The following census in 2011 counted 1,417 people in 427 households. The 2016 census measured the population of the village as 1,561 people in 512 households.
