= Farah Kosh-e Olya =

Farah Kosh-e Olya فره کش عليا
- Village
- Location within Iran
- Coordinates: 33°30′36″N 48°39′41″E
- Country: Iran
- Province: Lorestan
- County: Khorramabad
- Bakhsh: Zagheh
- Rural District: Zagheh

Population (2006)
  - Total: 96
- Time zone: UTC+3:30 (IRST)
  - Summer (DST): UTC+4:30 (IRDT)

Farah Kosh-e Olya (Persian: فره کش عليا, also Romanized as Faraḩ Kosh-e ‘Olyā and Faraḩ Kash-e ‘Olyā; also known as Faraḩ Kash, Faraḩkesh-e Bālā, Fārākash, and Seydān) is a village in Zagheh Rural District, Zagheh District, Khorramabad County, Lorestan Province, Iran. At the 2006 census, its population was 96, in 24 families.
