= Rangrazan-e Olya =

Rangrazan-e Olya رنگرزان عليا
- Village
- Location within Iran
- Coordinates: 33°32′42″N 48°48′13″E
- Country: Iran
- Province: Lorestan
- County: Khorramabad
- Bakhsh: Zagheh
- Rural District: Qaedrahmat

Population (2006)
  - Total: 206
- Time zone: UTC+3:30 (IRST)
  - Summer (DST): UTC+4:30 (IRDT)

Rangrazan-e Olya (Persian: رنگرزان عليا, also Romanized as Rangrazān-e ‘Olyā; also known as Rang-i-Rāzān and Rangrazān) is a village in Qaedrahmat Rural District, Zagheh District, Khorramabad County, Lorestan Province, Iran. At the 2006 census, its population was 206, in 38 families.
