= Jahanbakhsh =

Jahanbakhsh may refer to:

- Alireza Jahanbakhsh (b. 1993), Iranian footballer
- Babak Jahanbakhsh (b. 1983), Iranian singer, composer and musician.
- Qaleh-ye Jahan Bakhsh, a village in Lorestan, Iran
