= Garmabalah-ye Olya =

Garmabalah-ye Olya گرمابله عليا
- Village
- Location within Iran
- Coordinates: 33°31′26″N 48°33′22″E
- Country: Iran
- Province: Lorestan
- County: Khorramabad
- Bakhsh: Zagheh
- Rural District: Zagheh

Population (2006)
  - Total: 89
- Time zone: UTC+3:30 (IRST)
  - Summer (DST): UTC+4:30 (IRDT)

Garmabalah-ye Olya (Persian: گرمابله عليا, also Romanized as Garmābalah-ye ‘Olyā and Garmāvaleh-ye ‘Olyā) is a village in Zagheh Rural District, Zagheh District, Khorramabad County, Lorestan Province, Iran. At the 2006 census, its population was 89, in 21 families.
