= Safarabad, Khorramabad =

Village in Lorestan province, Iran

Safarabad Persian: صفراباد
- Village
- Location within Iran
- Coordinates: 33°32′32″N 48°49′34″E
- Country: Iran
- Province: Lorestan
- County: Khorramabad
- District: Zagheh
- Rural District: Razan

Population (2016)
  - Total: 165
- Time zone: UTC+3:30 (IRST)

Safarabad (Persian: صفراباد) (Note: Also romanized as Şafarābād) is a village in Razan Rural District of Zagheh District in Khorramabad County, Lorestan province, Iran.

== Demographics ==
=== Population ===
At the time of the 2006 National Census, the village's population was 138 in 25 households. The following census in 2011 counted 21 people in five households. The 2016 census measured the population of the village as 165 people in 40 households.
