= Kian Baraftab =

Village in Lorestan province, Iran

Kian Baraftab Persian: کيان برآفتاب
- Village
- Location within Iran
- Coordinates: 33°25′05″N 48°42′45″E
- Country: Iran
- Province: Lorestan
- County: Khorramabad
- District: Zagheh
- Rural District: Zagheh

Population (2016)
  - Total: 231
- Time zone: UTC+3:30 (IRST)

Kian Baraftab (Persian: کيان برآفتاب) (Note: Also romanized as Kīān Barāftāb; also known as Kīān-e Soflá (کيان سفلي)) is a village in Zagheh Rural District of Zagheh District in Khorramabad County, Lorestan province, Iran.

== Demographics ==
=== Population ===
At the time of the 2006 National Census, the village's population was 186 in 42 households. The following census in 2011 counted 185 people in 47 households. The 2016 census measured the population of the village as 231 people in 66 households.
