= Siah Mazgi =

Village in Gilan province, Iran

Siah Mazgi Persian: سياهمزگي
- Village
- Location within Iran
- Coordinates: 37°01′47″N 49°17′03″E
- Country: Iran
- Province: Gilan
- County: Shaft
- District: Ahmadsargurab
- Rural District: Ahmadsargurab

Population (2016)
  - Total: 820
- Time zone: UTC+3:30 (IRST)

Siah Mazgi (Persian: سياهمزگي) (Note: Also romanized as Sīāh Mazgī) is a village in Ahmadsargurab Rural District of Ahmadsargurab District in Shaft County, Gilan province, Iran.

== Demographics ==
=== Population ===
At the time of the 2006 National Census, the village's population was 1,425 in 343 households. The following census in 2011 counted 1,167 people in 325 households. The 2016 census measured the population of the village as 820 people in 263 households.
