= Jirdeh, Shaft =

Village in Gilan province, Iran

Jirdeh Persian: جيرده
- Village
- Location within Iran
- Coordinates: 37°10′37″N 49°29′05″E
- Country: Iran
- Province: Gilan
- County: Shaft
- District: Central
- Rural District: Jirdeh

Population (2016)
  - Total: 1,449
- Time zone: UTC+3:30 (IRST)

Jirdeh (Persian: جيرده) (Note: Also romanized as Jīrdeh; also known as Jirdeh Shaft) is a village in, and the capital of, Jirdeh Rural District in the Central District of Shaft County, Gilan province, Iran.

== Demographics ==
=== Population ===
At the time of the 2006 National Census, the village's population was 1,476 in 376 households. The following census in 2011 counted 1,513 people in 455 households. The 2016 census measured the population of the village as 1,449 people in 481 households. It was the most populous village in its rural district.
