= Key Kam Dar =

Village in Lorestan province, Iran

Key Kam Dar Persian: كي كمدر
- Village
- Location within Iran
- Coordinates: 33°28′31″N 48°48′35″E
- Country: Iran
- Province: Lorestan
- County: Khorramabad
- District: Zagheh
- Rural District: Qaedrahmat

Population (2016)
  - Total: 202
- Time zone: UTC+3:30 (IRST)

Key Kam Dar (Persian: كي كمدر) (Note: Also known as Kolī Kamdarreh) is a village in Qaedrahmat Rural District of Zagheh District in Khorramabad County, Lorestan province, Iran.

== Demographics ==
=== Population ===
At the time of the 2006 National Census, the village's population was 327 in 69 households. The following census in 2011 counted 196 people in 56 households. The 2016 census measured the population of the village as 202 people in 59 households.
