= Talesh Mahalleh =

Talesh Mahalleh (Persian: طالش محله) may refer to various places in Iran:

== Gilan Province ==
- Talesh Mahalleh, Langarud, Gilan Province
- Talesh Mahalleh, Rasht, Gilan Province
- Talesh Mahalleh, Shaft, Gilan Province
- Talesh Mahalleh, Sowme'eh Sara, Gilan Province

== Mazandaran Province ==
- Talesh Mahalleh, Juybar, Mazandaran Province
- Talesh Mahalleh-ye Fatuk, Ramsar County, Mazandaran Province
- Talesh Mahalleh, Tonekabon, Mazandaran Province
