= Deh Sefid-e Vosta =

Village in Lorestan, Iran

Deh Sefid-e Vosta ده‌سفید وسطی
- Village
- Location within Iran
- Coordinates: 33°30′04″N 48°32′26″E
- Country: Iran
- Province: Lorestan
- County: Khorramabad
- Bakhsh: Zagheh
- Rural District: Zagheh

Population (2006)
  - Total: 122
- Time zone: UTC+3:30 (IRST)
  - Summer (DST): UTC+4:30 (IRDT)

Deh Sefid-e Vosta (Persian: ده‌سفید وسطی, also Romanized as Deh Sefīd-e Vosţá; also known as Deh Sefīd-e Moţahharī and Deh Sefīd Moţahharī) is a village in Zagheh Rural District, Zagheh District, Khorramabad County, Lorestan Province, Iran. At the 2006 census, its population was 122, in 27 families.
