= Chubar, Shaft =

Village in Gilan province, Iran

Chubar Persian: چوبر
- Village
- Location within Iran
- Coordinates: 37°05′27″N 49°25′10″E
- Country: Iran
- Province: Gilan
- County: Shaft
- District: Ahmadsargurab
- Rural District: Chubar

Population (2016)
  - Total: 1,069
- Time zone: UTC+3:30 (IRST)

Chubar (Persian: چوبر) (Note: Also romanized as Choobor, Chowbar, Chūbar, and Chuber; also known as Chobar) is a village in, and the capital of, Chubar Rural District in Ahmadsargurab District of Shaft County, Gilan province, Iran.

== Demographics ==
=== Population ===
At the time of the 2006 National Census, the village's population was 1,248 in 335 households. The following census in 2011 counted 1,265 people in 375 households. The 2016 census measured the population of the village as 1,069 people in 360 households. It was the most populous village in its rural district.
