= Yek Borji =

Yek Borji (Persian: يك برجي) may refer to:

- Yek Borji, Khuzestan
- Yek Borji, Lorestan
