= Qaleh-ye Gol =

Qaleh-ye Gol or Qaleh Gol (Persian: قلعه گل) may refer to:

- Qaleh Gol, Gilan
- Qaleh-ye Gol, Kohgiluyeh and Boyer-Ahmad
