= Khers Dar =

Village in Lorestan province, Iran

Khers Dar Persian: خرسدر
- Village
- Location within Iran
- Coordinates: 33°34′04″N 48°45′24″E
- Country: Iran
- Province: Lorestan
- County: Khorramabad
- District: Zagheh
- Rural District: Qaedrahmat

Population (2016)
  - Total: 213
- Time zone: UTC+3:30 (IRST)

Khers Dar (Persian: خرسدر) (Note: Also known as Kīshtar and Seyl-e Karim (‌سیل کریم)) is a village in Qaedrahmat Rural District of Zagheh District in Khorramabad County, Lorestan province, Iran.

== Demographics ==
=== Population ===
At the time of the 2006 National Census, the village's population was 236 in 42 households. The following census in 2011 counted 186 people in 45 households. The 2016 census measured the population of the village as 213 people in 46 households.
