= Qassab Mahalleh =

Qassab Mahalleh (Persian: قصاب محله) may refer to:

- Qassab Mahalleh, Lahijan
- Qassab Mahalleh, Shaft
