= Badeh, Khorramabad =

Village in Lorestan province, Iran

Badeh Persian: باده
- Village
- Location within Iran
- Coordinates: 33°28′22″N 48°35′53″E
- Country: Iran
- Province: Lorestan
- County: Khorramabad
- District: Zagheh
- Rural District: Zagheh

Population (2016)
  - Total: 548
- Time zone: UTC+3:30 (IRST)

Badeh (Persian: باده) (Note: Also romanized as Bādeh; also known as Bādeh-e Bostān and Bādeh-ye Ābestān) is a village in Zagheh Rural District of Zagheh District in Khorramabad County, Lorestan province, Iran.

== An Introduction of Badeh ==
=== Population ===
At the time of the 2006 National Census, the village's population was 557 in 113 households. The following census in 2011 counted 586 people in 150 households. The 2016 census measured the population of the village as 548 people in 153 households, the most populous in its rural district.
