= Sargerefteh-ye Pain =

Village in Lorestan province, Iran

Sargerefteh-ye Pain Persian: سرگرفته پايين
- Village
- Location within Iran
- Coordinates: 33°35′24″N 48°50′43″E
- Country: Iran
- Province: Lorestan
- County: Khorramabad
- District: Zagheh
- Rural District: Razan

Population (2016)
  - Total: 151
- Time zone: UTC+3:30 (IRST)

Sargerefteh-ye Pain (Persian: سرگرفته پايين) (Note: Also romanized as Sar Gerefteh-ye Pā’īn and Sargerefteh-ye Pā’īn; formerly known as Sargerefteh-ye Sofla (سرگرفته سفلي), also romanized as Sar Gerefteh-ye Soflá and Sargerefteh-ye Soflá; also known as Sar Garīseh-ye Pā’īn, Sar Gereft-e Pā’īn, Sar Gerefteh, Sargarift Sufla, and Sargerīseh-ye Pā’īn) is a village in Razan Rural District of Zagheh District in Khorramabad County, Lorestan province, Iran.

== Demographics ==
=== Population ===
At the time of the 2006 National Census, the village's population, as Sargerefteh-ye Sofla, was 245 in 53 households. The following census in 2011 counted 49 people in 12 households, by which time the village was listed as Sargerefteh-ye Pain. The 2016 census measured the population of the village as 151 people in 41 households.
