= Khalilan-e Sofla, Lorestan =

Khalilan-e Sofla خليلان سفلي
- Village
- Location within Iran
- Coordinates: 33°32′53″N 48°44′15″E
- Country: Iran
- Province: Lorestan
- County: Khorramabad
- Bakhsh: Zagheh
- Rural District: Qaedrahmat

Population (2006)
  - Total: 187
- Time zone: UTC+3:30 (IRST)
  - Summer (DST): UTC+4:30 (IRDT)

Khalilan-e Sofla (Persian: خليلان سفلي, also Romanized as Khalīlān-e Soflá; also known as Khalīlān-e Pā'īn) is a village in Qaedrahmat Rural District, Zagheh District, Khorramabad County, Lorestan Province, Iran. At the 2006 census, its population was 187, in 44 families.
