= Khalilan-e Sofla =

Khalilan-e Sofla (Persian: خليلان سفلي) may refer to:

- Khalilan-e Sofla, Kermanshah
- Khalilan-e Sofla, Lorestan
