= Deh Sefid-e Olya =

Deh Sefid-e Olya ده‌سفيد علیا
- Village
- Location within Iran
- Coordinates: 33°30′30″N 48°32′09″E
- Country: Iran
- Province: Lorestan
- County: Khorramabad
- Bakhsh: Zagheh
- Rural District: Zagheh

Population (2006)
  - Total: 65
- Time zone: UTC+3:30 (IRST)
  - Summer (DST): UTC+4:30 (IRDT)

Deh Sefid-e Olya (Persian: ده‌سفید علیا, also Romanized as Deh Sefīd-e ‘Olyā and Deh Sefīd ‘Olyā) is a village in Zagheh Rural District, Zagheh District, Khorramabad County, Lorestan Province, Iran. At the 2006 census, its population was 65, in 11 families.
