= Chubar Rural District =

Chubar Rural District (Persian: دهستان چوبر) may refer to:

- Chubar Rural District (Shaft County)
- Chubar Rural District (Talesh County)
