= Chomacha =

Village in Gilan province, Iran

Chomacha Persian: چماچا
- Village
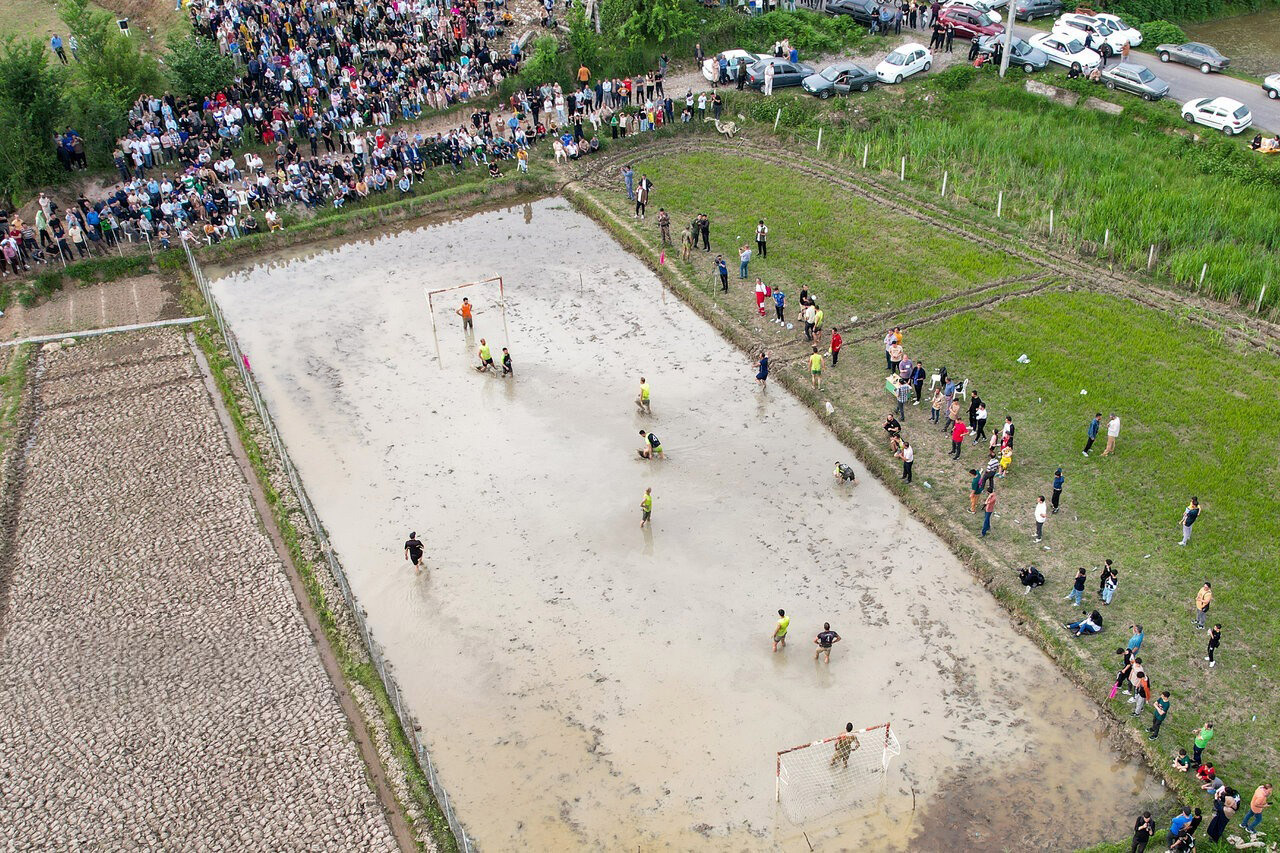
- Futsal competition in the village of Chamacha

- Location within Iran
- Coordinates: 37°08′02″N 49°31′14″E
- Country: Iran
- Province: Gilan
- County: Shaft
- District: Central
- Rural District: Jirdeh

Population (2016)
  - Total: 758
- Time zone: UTC+3:30 (IRST)

Chomacha (Persian: چماچا) (Note: Also romanized as Chomāchā; Gilaki: چۊماچا) is a village in Jirdeh Rural District of the Central District in Shaft County, Gilan province, Iran.

== Demographics ==
=== Population ===
At the time of the 2006 National Census, the village's population was 1,356 in 330 households. The following census in 2011 counted 1,092 people in 343 households. The 2016 census measured the population of the village as 758 people in 262 households.
