= Taju-ye Vosta =

Taju-ye Vosta تاجوي وسطي
- Village
- Location within Iran
- Coordinates: 33°32′51″N 48°41′06″E
- Country: Iran
- Province: Lorestan
- County: Khorramabad
- Bakhsh: Zagheh
- Rural District: Zagheh

Population (2006)
  - Total: 16
- Time zone: UTC+3:30 (IRST)
  - Summer (DST): UTC+4:30 (IRDT)

Taju-ye Vosta (Persian: تاجوي وسطي, also Romanized as Tājū-ye Vosţá; also known as Tājū-ye ‘Olyā and Tājū) is a village in Zagheh Rural District, Zagheh District, Khorramabad County, Lorestan Province, Iran. At the 2006 census, its population was 16, in 4 families.
