= Khomiran =

Khomiran or Khomeyran or Khamiran (Persian: خميران) may refer to:

- Khomiran, Bandar-e Anzali, Gilan Province
- Khomeyran, Shaft, Gilan Province
- Khamiran, Isfahan
