= Seyqalan =

Seyqalan (Persian: صيقلان), also rendered as Segelyan, may refer to:

- Seyqalan-e Varzal, Rasht County
- Seyqalan, Shaft
- Seyqalan, Sowme'eh Sara
- Seyqalan, Tulem, Sowme'eh Sara County
