= Duliskan, Iran =

Village in Lorestan province, Iran

Duliskan Persian: دوليسكان
- Village
- Location within Iran
- Coordinates: 33°34′35″N 48°41′54″E
- Country: Iran
- Province: Lorestan
- County: Khorramabad
- District: Zagheh
- Rural District: Qaedrahmat

Population (2016)
  - Total: 212
- Time zone: UTC+3:30 (IRST)

Duliskan (Persian: دوليسكان) (Note: Also romanized as Dowlīskān and Dūlīskān; formerly known as Duliskan-e Olya (دوليسكان عليا), also romanized as Dūlīskān-e ‘Olyā; also known as Dhūlīs Khān, Doliskan, Dowlīsgān, and Dūlīsgān) is a village in Qaedrahmat Rural District of Zagheh District in Khorramabad County, Lorestan province, Iran.

== Demographics ==
=== Population ===
At the time of the 2006 National Census, the village's population, as Duliskan-e Olya, was 255 in 44 households. The following census in 2011 counted 266 people in 64 households, by which time the village was listed as Duliskan. The 2016 census measured the population of the village as 212 people in 56 households.
