= Chaqalvand Rud-e Pain =

Village in Lorestan province, Iran

Chaqalvand Rud-e Pain Persian: چغلوندرودپايين
- Village
- Location within Iran
- Coordinates: 33°30′17″N 48°47′54″E
- Country: Iran
- Province: Lorestan
- County: Khorramabad
- District: Zagheh
- Rural District: Qaedrahmat

Population (2016)
  - Total: 107
- Time zone: UTC+3:30 (IRST)

Chaqalvand Rud-e Pain (Persian: چغلوندرودپايين) (Note: Also romanized as Chaqalvand Rūd-e Pā’īn; formerly known as Chaqalvand Rud-e Sofla (چغلوندرودسفلي), also romanized as Chaqalvand Rūd-e Soflá; also known as Chaghalvand Rūd-e Soflá, Chaqalvand Rūd, and Chaqalvand-e Soflá) is a village in Qaedrahmat Rural District of Zagheh District in Khorramabad County, Lorestan province, Iran.

== Demographics ==
=== Population ===
At the time of the 2006 National Census, the village's population, as Chaqalvand Rud-e Sofla, was 169 in 34 households. The following census in 2011 counted 134 people in 37 households, by which time the village was listed as Chaqalvand Rud-e Pain. The 2016 census measured the population of the village as 107 people in 30 households.
