= Chaqalvand Rud-e Bala =

Village in Lorestan province, Iran

Chaqalvand Rud-e Bala Persian: چغلوندرودبالا
- Village
- Location within Iran
- Coordinates: 33°30′17″N 48°48′08″E
- Country: Iran
- Province: Lorestan
- County: Khorramabad
- District: Zagheh
- Rural District: Qaedrahmat

Population (2016)
  - Total: 281
- Time zone: UTC+3:30 (IRST)

Chaqalvand Rud-e Bala (Persian: چغلوندرودبالا) (Note: Also romanized as Chaqalvand Rūd-e Bālā; formerly known as Chaqalvand Rud-e Olya (چغلوندرودعليا), also romanized as Chaqalvand Rūd-e 'Olyā; also known as Chaghalvand Rūd-e 'Olyā) is a village in Qaedrahmat Rural District of Zagheh District in Khorramabad County, Lorestan province, Iran.

== Demographics ==
=== Population ===
At the time of the 2006 National Census, the village's population, as Chaqalvand Rud-e Olya, was 365 in 77 households. The following census in 2011 counted 340 people in 93 households, by which time the village was listed as Chaqalvand Rud-e Bala. The 2016 census measured the population of the village as 281 people in 77 households.
