= Kalleh Jub, Zagheh =

Village in Lorestan province, Iran

Kalleh Jub Persian: كله جوب
- Village
- Location within Iran
- Coordinates: 33°31′58″N 48°45′41″E
- Country: Iran
- Province: Lorestan
- County: Khorramabad
- District: Zagheh
- Rural District: Qaedrahmat

Population (2016)
  - Total: 849
- Time zone: UTC+3:30 (IRST)

Kalleh Jub (Persian: كله جوب) (Note: Also romanized as Kalleh Jūb; also known as Kaleh Chūb, Khaluju, Koleh Jūb-e Bālā, and Koleh Jūb-e ‘Olyā) is a village in Qaedrahmat Rural District of Zagheh District in Khorramabad County, Lorestan province, Iran.

== Demographics ==
=== Population ===
At the time of the 2006 National Census, the village's population was 851 in 180 households. The following census in 2011 counted 883 people in 225 households. The 2016 census measured the population of the village as 849 people in 224 households, the most populous in its rural district.
