= Girchan, Zagheh =

Village in Lorestan province, Iran

Girchan Persian: گيرچان
- Village
- Location within Iran
- Coordinates: 33°28′26″N 48°37′49″E
- Country: Iran
- Province: Lorestan
- County: Khorramabad
- District: Zagheh
- Rural District: Zagheh

Population (2016)
  - Total: 228
- Time zone: UTC+3:30 (IRST)

Girchan (Persian: گيرچان) (Note: Also romanized as Gīrchān) is a village in Zagheh Rural District of Zagheh District in Khorramabad County, Lorestan province, Iran.

== Demographics ==
=== Population ===
At the time of the 2006 National Census, the village's population was 242 in 51 households. The following census in 2011 counted 228 people in 62 households. The 2016 census measured the population of the village as 228 people in 70 households.
