= Rangrazan-e Pain =

Village in Lorestan province, Iran

Rangrazan-e Pain Persian: رنگرزان پايين
- Village
- Location within Iran
- Coordinates: 33°32′15″N 48°47′45″E
- Country: Iran
- Province: Lorestan
- County: Khorramabad
- District: Zagheh
- Rural District: Razan

Population (2016)
  - Total: 383
- Time zone: UTC+3:30 (IRST)

Rangrazan-e Pain (Persian: رنگرزان پايين) (Note: Also romanized as Rangrazān-e Pā’īn; formerly known as Rangrazan-e Sofla (رنگرزان سفلي), also romanized as Rangrazān-e Soflá; also known as Rangrazān) is a village in Razan Rural District of Zagheh District in Khorramabad County, Lorestan province, Iran.

== Demographics ==
=== Population ===
At the time of the 2006 National Census, the village's population, as Rangrazan-e Sofla, was 369 in 70 households. The following census in 2011 counted 42 people in 17 households, by which time the village was listed as Rangrazan-e Pain. The 2016 census measured the population of the village as 383 people in 107 households.
