= Mir Ahmadi, Razan =

Village in Lorestan province, Iran

Mir Ahmadi Persian: ميراحمدي
- Village
- Location within Iran
- Coordinates: 33°34′56″N 48°55′19″E
- Country: Iran
- Province: Lorestan
- County: Khorramabad
- District: Zagheh
- Rural District: Razan

Population (2016)
  - Total: 38
- Time zone: UTC+3:30 (IRST)

Mir Ahmadi (Persian: ميراحمدي) (Note: Also romanized as Mīr Aḩmadī) is a village in Razan Rural District of Zagheh District in Khorramabad County, Lorestan province, Iran.

== Demographics ==
=== Population ===
At the time of the 2006 National Census, the village's population was 35 in six households. The 2016 census measured the population of the village as 38 people in 10 households.
