= Duliskan-e Vosta =

Village in Lorestan province, Iran

Duliskan-e Vosta Persian: دوليسكان وسطي
- Village
- Location within Iran
- Coordinates: 33°34′23″N 48°41′31″E
- Country: Iran
- Province: Lorestan
- County: Khorramabad
- District: Zagheh
- Rural District: Qaedrahmat

Population (2016)
  - Total: 165
- Time zone: UTC+3:30 (IRST)

Duliskan-e Vosta (Persian: دوليسكان وسطي) (Note: Also romanized as Dūlīskān-e Vosţá; also known as Dūlīs Kān) is a village in Qaedrahmat Rural District of Zagheh District in Khorramabad County, Lorestan province, Iran.

== Demographics ==
=== Population ===
At the time of the 2006 National Census, the village's population was 205 in 35 households. The following census in 2011 counted 174 people in 42 households. The 2016 census measured the population of the village as 165 people in 43 households.
