= Mir Ahmadi, Zagheh =

Village in Lorestan province, Iran

Mir Ahmadi Persian: ميراحمدي
- Village
- Location within Iran
- Coordinates: 33°34′54″N 48°39′44″E
- Country: Iran
- Province: Lorestan
- County: Khorramabad
- District: Zagheh
- Rural District: Zagheh

Population (2016)
  - Total: 334
- Time zone: UTC+3:30 (IRST)

Mir Ahmadi (Persian: ميراحمدي) (Note: Also romanized as Mīr Aḩmadī; also known as Mīr Ahmad) is a village in Zagheh Rural District of Zagheh District in Khorramabad County, Lorestan province, Iran.

== Demographics ==
=== Population ===
At the time of the 2006 National Census, the village's population was 411 in 71 households. The following census in 2011 counted 405 people in 86 households. The 2016 census measured the population of the village as 334 people in 90 households.
