= Zagheh =

City in Lorestan province, Iran

Zagheh Persian: زاغه
- City
- Location within Iran
- Coordinates: 33°29′59″N 48°42′27″E
- Country: Iran
- Province: Lorestan
- County: Khorramabad
- District: Zagheh

Population (2016)
  - Total: 2,776
- Time zone: UTC+3:30 (IRST)

Zagheh (Persian: زاغه) (Note: Also romanized as Zāgheh) is a city in, and the capital of, Zagheh District of Khorramabad County, Lorestan province, Iran. It also serves as the administrative center for Zagheh Rural District.

== Demographics ==
=== Population ===
At the time of the 2006 National Census, the city's population was 2,839 in 618 households. The following census in 2011 counted 2,685 people in 663 households. The 2016 census measured the population of the city as 2,776 people in 815 households.
