= Deh Sefid-e Pain =

Village in Lorestan province, Iran

Deh Sefid-e Pain Persian: ده‌سفید پایین
- Village
- Location within Iran
- Coordinates: 33°29′56″N 48°32′16″E
- Country: Iran
- Province: Lorestan
- County: Khorramabad
- District: Zagheh
- Rural District: Zagheh

Population (2016)
  - Total: 258
- Time zone: UTC+3:30 (IRST)

Deh Sefid-e Pain (Persian: ده‌سفید پایین) (Note: Also romanized as Deh Sefīd-e Pā’īn; formerly known as Deh Sefid-e Sofla (ده‌سفید سفلی), also romanized as Deh Sefīd Soflá and Deh Sefīd-e Soflá) is a village in Zagheh Rural District of Zagheh District in Khorramabad County, Lorestan province, Iran.

== Demographics ==
=== Population ===
At the time of the 2006 National Census, the village's population, as Deh Sefid-e Sofla, was 327 in 57 households. The following census in 2011 counted 298 people in 72 households, by which time the village was listed as Deh Sefid-e Pain. The 2016 census measured the population of the village as 258 people in 66 households.
