= Duliskan-e Pain =

Village in Lorestan province, Iran

Duliskan-e Pain Persian: دوليسکان پايين
- Village
- Location within Iran
- Coordinates: 33°34′13″N 48°41′17″E
- Country: Iran
- Province: Lorestan
- County: Khorramabad
- District: Zagheh
- Rural District: Qaedrahmat

Population (2016)
  - Total: 84
- Time zone: UTC+3:30 (IRST)

Duliskan-e Pain (Persian: دوليسکان پايين) (Note: Also romanized as Dūlīskān-e Pā’īn; formerly known as Duliskan-e Sofla (دوليسكان سفلي), also romanized as Dūlīskān-e Soflá) is a village in Qaedrahmat Rural District of Zagheh District in Khorramabad County, Lorestan province, Iran.

== Demographics ==
=== Population ===
At the time of the 2006 National Census, the village's population, as Duliskan-e Sofla, was 98 in 15 households. The following census in 2011 counted 100 people in 20 households, by which time the village was listed as Duliskan-e Pain. The 2016 census measured the population of the village as 84 people in 16 households.
