= Razan, Lorestan =

Village in Lorestan province, Iran

Razan Persian: رازان
- Village
- Location within Iran
- Coordinates: 33°33′52″N 48°52′11″E
- Country: Iran
- Province: Lorestan
- County: Khorramabad
- District: Zagheh
- Rural District: Razan

Population (2016)
  - Total: 2,162
- Time zone: UTC+3:30 (IRST)

Razan (Persian: رازان) (Note: Also romanized as Rāzān) is a village in, and the capital of, Razan Rural District in Zagheh District of Khorramabad County, Lorestan province, Iran.

== Demographics ==
=== Population ===
At the time of the 2006 National Census, the village's population was 1,757 in 423 households. The following census in 2011 counted 1,850 people in 486 households. The 2016 census measured the population of the village as 2,162 people in 612 households, the most populous in its rural district.
