= Khalilan-e Olya, Lorestan =

Village in Lorestan province, Iran

Khalilan-e Olya Persian: خليلان عليا
- Village
- Location within Iran
- Coordinates: 33°32′45″N 48°44′45″E
- Country: Iran
- Province: Lorestan
- County: Khorramabad
- District: Zagheh
- Rural District: Qaedrahmat

Population (2016)
  - Total: 329
- Time zone: UTC+3:30 (IRST)

Khalilan-e Olya (Persian: خليلان عليا) (Note: Also romanized as Khalīlān-e ‘Olyā; also known as Khalīlān-e Bālā) is a village in Qaedrahmat Rural District of Zagheh District in Khorramabad County, Lorestan province, Iran.

== Demographics ==
=== Population ===
At the time of the 2006 National Census, the village's population was 371 in 94 households. The following census in 2011 counted 356 people in 100 households. The 2016 census measured the population of the village as 329 people in 95 households.
