= Kalleh Jub-e Sofla, Lorestan =

Village in Lorestan province, Iran

Kalleh Jub-e Sofla Persian: كله جوب سفلي
- Village
- Location within Iran
- Coordinates: 33°33′35″N 48°43′15″E
- Country: Iran
- Province: Lorestan
- County: Khorramabad
- District: Zagheh
- Rural District: Qaedrahmat

Population (2016)
  - Total: 235
- Time zone: UTC+3:30 (IRST)

Kalleh Jub-e Sofla (Persian: كله جوب سفلي) (Note: Also romanized as Kalleh Jūb-e Soflá, Koleh Jub-e Sofla, and Koleh Jūb-e Soflá; also known as Kalajūb, Kalleh Jūb, Kolajū, Koleh Jū, Koleh Jūb, and Kulāhju) is a village in Qaedrahmat Rural District of Zagheh District in Khorramabad County, Lorestan province, Iran.

== Demographics ==
=== Population ===
At the time of the 2006 National Census, the village's population was 328 in 65 households. The following census in 2011 counted 212 people in 54 households. The 2016 census measured the population of the village as 235 people in 63 households.
