= Ahmadsargurab =

City in Gilan province, Iran

Ahmadsargurab Persian: احمدسرگوراب
- City
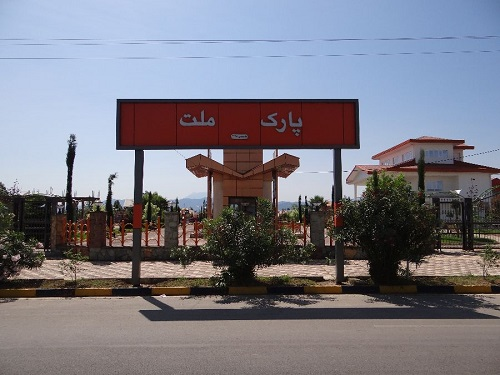
- The city of Ahmadsargurab

- Location within Iran
- Coordinates: 37°07′54″N 49°22′01″E
- Country: Iran
- Province: Gilan
- County: Shaft
- District: Ahmadsargurab
- Established as a city: 2000

Population (2016)
  - Total: 2,128
- Time zone: UTC+3:30 (IRST)

Ahmadsargurab (Persian: احمدسرگوراب) (Note: Also romanized as Aḩmad Sar Gūrāb and Aḩmadsargūrāb; Gilaki: أحمدسرگۊراب) is a city in, and the capital of, Ahmadsargurab District of Shaft County, Gilan province, Iran. The village of Ahmadsargurab was converted to a city in 2000.

== Demographics ==
=== Population ===
At the time of the 2006 National Census, the city's population was 2,223 in 603 households. The following census in 2011 counted 2,346 people in 751 households. The 2016 census measured the population of the city as 2,128 people in 727 households.
