= Shah Neshin, Kohgiluyeh and Boyer-Ahmad =

Shah Neshin شاه نشين
- Village
- Location within Iran
- Coordinates: 31°09′15″N 50°05′31″E
- Country: Iran
- Province: Kohgiluyeh and Boyer-Ahmad
- County: Bahmai
- Bakhsh: Bahmai-ye Garmsiri
- Rural District: Bahmai-ye Garmsiri-ye Shomali

Population (2006)
  - Total: 21
- Time zone: UTC+3:30 (IRST)
  - Summer (DST): UTC+4:30 (IRDT)

Shah Neshin (Persian: شاه نشين, also Romanized as Shāh Neshīn; also known as Shahneshin) is a village in Bahmai-ye Garmsiri-ye Shomali Rural District, Bahmai-ye Garmsiri District, Bahmai County, Kohgiluyeh and Boyer-Ahmad Province, Iran. At the 2006 census, its population was 21, in 5 families.
