= Shaneshin =

Shaneshin شانشين
- Village
- Location within Iran
- Coordinates: 35°38′18″N 46°36′20″E
- Country: Iran
- Province: Kurdistan
- County: Marivan
- Bakhsh: Sarshiv
- Rural District: Gol-e Cheydar

Population (2006)
  - Total: 232
- Time zone: UTC+3:30 (IRST)
  - Summer (DST): UTC+4:30 (IRDT)

Shaneshin (Persian: شانشين, also Romanized as Shāneshīn; also known as Shāh Neshīn) is a village in Gol-e Cheydar Rural District, Sarshiv District, Marivan County, Kurdistan Province, Iran. At the 2006 census, its population was 232, in 45 families. The village is populated by Kurds.
