= Kaveh-ye Olya (Deh Sefid) =

Kaveh-ye Olya کاوه علیا
- Village
- Location within Iran
- Coordinates: 34°09′00″N 47°38′00″E
- Country: Iran
- Province: Lorestan
- County: Delfan
- Bakhsh: Kakavand
- Rural District: Kakavand-e Sharqi

Population (2006)
  - Total: 172
- Time zone: UTC+3:30 (IRST)
  - Summer (DST): UTC+4:30 (IRDT)

Kaveh-ye Olya (Persian: کاوه علیا, also Romanized as Kāveh-ye ‘Olyā; also known as Deh Sefid (Persian: ده‌سفید), also Romanized as Deh Sefīd) is a village in Kakavand-e Sharqi Rural District, Kakavand District, Delfan County, Lorestan Province, Iran. At the 2006 census, its population was 172, in 34 families.
