= Deh Sefid Darvish =

Village in Lorestan, Iran

Deh Sefid Darvish ده سفيددرويش
- Village
- Location within Iran
- Coordinates: 33°23′35″N 49°46′58″E
- Country: Iran
- Province: Lorestan
- County: Aligudarz
- Bakhsh: Central
- Rural District: Khomeh

Population (2006)
  - Total: 120
- Time zone: UTC+3:30 (IRST)
  - Summer (DST): UTC+4:30 (IRDT)

Deh Sefid Darvish (Persian: ده سفيددرويش, also Romanized as Deh Sefīd Darvīsh; also known as Deh-e Sefīd) is a village in Khomeh Rural District, in the Central District of Aligudarz County, Lorestan Province, Iran. At the 2006 census, its population was 120, in 24 families.
