= Deh-e Sefid Salianeh =

Village in Lorestan, Iran

Deh-e Sefid Salianeh ده سفیدسالیانه
- Village
- Location within Iran
- Coordinates: 33°49′12″N 48°13′04″E
- Country: Iran
- Province: Lorestan
- County: Selseleh
- Bakhsh: Central
- Rural District: Doab

Population (2006)
  - Total: 25
- Time zone: UTC+3:30 (IRST)
  - Summer (DST): UTC+4:30 (IRDT)

Deh-e Sefid Salianeh (Persian: ده سفیدسالیانه, also Romanized as Deh-e Sefīd Sālīāneh) is a village in Doab Rural District, in the Central District of Selseleh County, Lorestan Province, Iran. At the 2006 census, its population was 25, in 4 families.
