= Khalilan, South Khorasan =

Khalilan خليلان
- Village
- Location within Iran
- Coordinates: 32°42′20″N 59°06′00″E
- Country: Iran
- Province: South Khorasan
- County: Khusf
- Bakhsh: Jolgeh-e Mazhan
- Rural District: Barakuh

Population (2006)
  - Total: 96
- Time zone: UTC+3:30 (IRST)
  - Summer (DST): UTC+4:30 (IRDT)

Khalilan (Persian: خليلان, also Romanized as Khalīlān; also known as Kalīrān and Khalīrān) is a village in Barakuh Rural District, Jolgeh-e Mazhan District, Khusf County, South Khorasan Province, Iran. At the 2006 census, its population was 96, in 35 families.
