= Deh Sefid, Khorramabad =

Deh Sefid ده‌سفید
- Village
- Location within Iran
- Coordinates: 33°18′33″N 48°52′15″E
- Country: Iran
- Province: Lorestan
- County: Khorramabad
- Bakhsh: Papi
- Rural District: Sepiddasht

Population (2006)
  - Total: 17
- Time zone: UTC+3:30 (IRST)
  - Summer (DST): UTC+4:30 (IRDT)

Deh Sefid (Persian: ده‌سفید, also Romanized as Deh Sefīd) is a village in Sepiddasht Rural District, Papi District, Khorramabad County, Lorestan Province, Iran. At the 2006 census, its population was 17, in 5 families.
