= Deh Sefid Karim =

Village in Lorestan, Iran

Deh Sefid Karim ده سفیدکريم
- Village
- Location within Iran
- Coordinates: 33°20′00″N 48°34′00″E
- Country: Iran
- Province: Lorestan
- County: Khorramabad
- Bakhsh: Central
- Rural District: Kakasharaf

Population (2006)
  - Total: 70
- Time zone: UTC+3:30 (IRST)
  - Summer (DST): UTC+4:30 (IRDT)

Deh Sefid Karim (Persian: ده سفیدکريم, also Romanized as Deh Sefīd Karīm; also known as Deh Sefīd) is a village in Kakasharaf Rural District, in the Central District of Khorramabad County, Lorestan Province, Iran. At the 2006 census, its population was 70, in 13 families.
