= Kuzehgaran, Kermanshah =

Kuzehgaran كوزه گران
- Village
- Location within Iran
- Coordinates: 34°54′53″N 47°32′55″E
- Country: Iran
- Province: Kermanshah
- County: Sonqor
- Bakhsh: Central
- Rural District: Gavrud

Population (2006)
  - Total: 115
- Time zone: UTC+3:30 (IRST)
  - Summer (DST): UTC+4:30 (IRDT)

Kuzehgaran (Persian: كوزه گران, also Romanized as Kūzehgarān) is a village in Gavrud Rural District, in the Central District of Sonqor County, Kermanshah Province, Iran. At the 2006 census, its population was 115, in 27 families.
