= Shaldeh, Fuman =

Shaldeh شالده
- Village
- Location within Iran
- Coordinates: 37°10′54″N 49°25′36″E
- Country: Iran
- Province: Gilan
- County: Fuman
- Bakhsh: Central
- Rural District: Gasht

Population (2006)
  - Total: 105
- Time zone: UTC+3:30 (IRST)
  - Summer (DST): UTC+4:30 (IRDT)

Shaldeh (Persian: شالده, also Romanized as Shāldeh) is a village in Gasht Rural District, in the Central District of Fuman County, Gilan Province, Iran. At the 2006 census, its population was 105, in 32 families.
