= Khalilan-e Olya, Kermanshah =

Village in Kermanshah, Iran

Khalilan-e Olya خليلان عليا
- Village
- Location within Iran
- Coordinates: 34°05′12″N 47°03′26″E
- Country: Iran
- Province: Kermanshah
- County: Kermanshah
- Bakhsh: Firuzabad
- Rural District: Sar Firuzabad

Population (2006)
  - Total: 72
- Time zone: UTC+3:30 (IRST)
  - Summer (DST): UTC+4:30 (IRDT)

Khalilan-e Olya (Persian: خليلان عليا, also Romanized as Khalīlān-e ‘Olyā) is a village in Sar Firuzabad Rural District, Firuzabad District, Kermanshah County, Kermanshah Province, Iran. At the 2006 census, its population was 72, in 17 families.
