= Deh Sefid, Kermanshah =

Village in Kermanshah, Iran

Deh Sefid ده سفيد
- Village
- Location within Iran
- Coordinates: 34°15′58″N 46°41′19″E
- Country: Iran
- Province: Kermanshah
- County: Kermanshah
- Bakhsh: Mahidasht
- Rural District: Chaqa Narges

Population (2006)
  - Total: 141
- Time zone: UTC+3:30 (IRST)
  - Summer (DST): UTC+4:30 (IRDT)

Deh Sefid (Persian: ده سفيد, also Romanized as Deh Sefīd) is a village in Chaqa Narges Rural District, Mahidasht District, Kermanshah County, Kermanshah Province, Iran. At the 2006 census, its population was 141, in 31 families.
