= Khalilan-e Sofla, Kermanshah =

Khalilan-e Sofla خليلان سفلي
- Village
- Location within Iran
- Coordinates: 34°05′08″N 47°03′05″E
- Country: Iran
- Province: Kermanshah
- County: Kermanshah
- Bakhsh: Firuzabad
- Rural District: Sar Firuzabad

Population (2006)
  - Total: 26
- Time zone: UTC+3:30 (IRST)
  - Summer (DST): UTC+4:30 (IRDT)

Khalilan-e Sofla (Persian: خليلان سفلي, also Romanized as Khalīlān-e Soflá) is a village in Sar Firuzabad Rural District, Firuzabad District, Kermanshah County, Kermanshah Province, Iran. At the 2006 census, its population was 26, in 5 families.
