= Kish Khaleh, Masal =

Kishe Khaleh كيش خاله
- Village
- Location within Iran
- Coordinates: 37°23′14″N 49°06′59″E
- Country: Iran
- Province: Gilan
- County: Masal
- Bakhsh: Masal
- Rural District: Masal

Population (2006)
  - Total: 224
- Time zone: UTC+3:30 (IRST)
  - Summer (DST): UTC+4:30 (IRDT)

Kishe Khaleh (Persian: كيشه خاله, also Romanized as Kīshe Khāleh) is a village in Masal Rural District, Masal District, Masal County, Gilan Province, Iran. At the 2006 census, its population was 224, in 56 families.
