= Rasteh Kenar-e Buin =

Rasteh Kenar-e Buin راسته كناربوئين
- Village
- Location within Iran
- Coordinates: 37°10′26″N 49°20′06″E
- Country: Iran
- Province: Gilan
- County: Fuman
- Bakhsh: Central
- Rural District: Gurab Pas

Population (2006)
  - Total: 514
- Time zone: UTC+3:30 (IRST)
  - Summer (DST): UTC+4:30 (IRDT)

Rasteh Kenar-e Buin (Persian: راسته كناربوئين, also Romanized as Rāsteh Kenār-e Bū’īn; also known as Rāsteh Kenār) is a village in Gurab Pas Rural District, in the Central District of Fuman County, Gilan Province, Iran. At the 2006 census, its population was 514, in 140 families.
