= Razan Rural District (Khorramabad County) =

Rural district in Lorestan province, Iran

Razan Rural District Persian: دهستان رازان
- Rural District
- Location within Iran
- Coordinates: 33°33′N 48°53′E
- Country: Iran
- Province: Lorestan
- County: Khorramabad
- District: Zagheh
- Established: 1987
- Capital: Razan

Population (2016)
  - Total: 3,260
- Time zone: UTC+3:30 (IRST)

Razan Rural District (Persian: دهستان رازان) is in Zagheh District of Khorramabad County, Lorestan province, Iran. Its capital is the village of Razan.

== Demographics ==
=== Population ===
At the time of the 2006 National Census, the rural district's population was 3,102 in 694 households. There were 2,052 inhabitants in 541 households at the following census of 2011. The 2016 census measured the population of the rural district as 3,260 in 914 households. The most populous of its 15 villages was Razan, with 2,162 people.

=== Other villages in the rural district ===
- Abkot
- Asgarabad
- Bagh-e Pasham
- Eyvashan Seyl
- Meleh Sorkheh
- Mir Ahmadi
- Rangrazan-e Pain
- Safarabad
- Sargerefteh-ye Pain
- Yar Ali
