= Molla Sara Rural District =

Rural district in Gilan province, Iran

Molla Sara Rural District Persian: دهستان ملاسرا
- Rural District
- Location within Iran
- Coordinates: 37°15′N 49°27′E
- Country: Iran
- Province: Gilan
- County: Shaft
- District: Central
- Established: 1987
- Capital: Molla Sara

Population (2016)
  - Total: 11,008
- Time zone: UTC+3:30 (IRST)

Molla Sara Rural District (Persian: دهستان ملاسرا) is in the Central District of Shaft County, Gilan province, Iran. Its capital is the village of Molla Sara.

== Demographics ==
=== Population ===
At the time of the 2006 National Census, the rural district's population was 12,596 in 3,308 households. There were 11,630 inhabitants in 3,570 households at the following census of 2011. The 2016 census measured the population of the rural district as 11,008 in 3,676 households. The most populous of its 17 villages was Kalashem-e Bala, with 1,732 people.

=== Other villages in the rural district ===
- Aqaseyyed Yaqub
- Chaku Sar
- Jirdeh-e Pasikhan
- Kasan
- Markhal
- Mashatuk
- Shad Khal
