= Ahmadsargurab Rural District =

Rural district in Gilan province, Iran

Ahmadsargurab Rural District Persian: دهستان احمدسرگوراب
- Rural District
- Location within Iran
- Coordinates: 37°03′N 49°16′E
- Country: Iran
- Province: Gilan
- County: Shaft
- District: Ahmadsargurab
- Established: 1987
- Capital: Nasir Mahalleh

Population (2016)
  - Total: 9,642
- Time zone: UTC+3:30 (IRST)

Ahmadsargurab Rural District (Persian: دهستان احمدسرگوراب) is in Ahmadsargurab District of Shaft County, Gilan province, Iran. Its capital is the village of Nasir Mahalleh.

== Demographics ==
=== Population ===
At the time of the 2006 National Census, the rural district's population was 12,988 in 3,253 households. There were 11,577 inhabitants in 3,352 households at the following census of 2011. The 2016 census measured the population of the rural district as 9,642 in 3,197 households. The most populous of its 16 villages was Nasir Mahalleh, with 2,700 people.

=== Other villages in the rural district ===
- Ali Sara
- Bedab
- Dubakhshar
- Ganjar
- Lepundan
- Sefid Mazgi
- Siah Mazgi
- Shalma
