= Qaedrahmat Rural District =

Rural district in Lorestan province, Iran

Qaedrahmat Rural District Persian: دهستان قائدرحمت
- Rural District
- Location within Iran
- Coordinates: 33°30′43″N 48°50′35″E
- Country: Iran
- Province: Lorestan
- County: Khorramabad
- District: Zagheh
- Established: 1987
- Capital: Pol Haru

Population (2016)
  - Total: 6,108
- Time zone: UTC+3:30 (IRST)

Qaedrahmat Rural District (Persian: دهستان قائدرحمت) is in Zagheh District of Khorramabad County, Lorestan province, Iran. Its capital is the village of Pol Haru. (Note: Also known as Siyah Gushi)

== Demographics ==
=== Population ===
At the time of the 2006 National Census, the rural district's population was 7,381 in 1,543 households. There were 6,449 inhabitants in 1,669 households at the following census of 2011. The 2016 census measured the population of the rural district as 6,108 in 1,662 households. The most populous of its 52 villages was Kalleh Jub, with 649 people.

=== Other villages in the rural district ===
- Chaqalvand Rud-e Bala
- Chaqalvand Rud-e Pain
- Duliskan
- Duliskan-e Pain
- Duliskan-e Vosta
- Haft Cheshmeh
- Kalleh Jub-e Sofla
- Key Kam Dar
- Khalilan-e Olya
- Khers Dar
- Zarrinabad
