= Zagheh Rural District =

Rural district in Lorestan province, Iran

Zagheh Rural District Persian: دهستان زاغه
- Rural District
- Location within Iran
- Coordinates: 33°29′N 48°41′E
- Country: Iran
- Province: Lorestan
- County: Khorramabad
- District: Zagheh
- Established: 1987
- Capital: Zagheh

Population (2016)
  - Total: 5,296
- Time zone: UTC+3:30 (IRST)

Zagheh Rural District (Persian: دهستان زاغه) is in Zagheh District of Khorramabad County, Lorestan province, Iran. It is administered from the city of Zagheh.

== Demographics ==
=== Population ===
At the time of the 2006 National Census, the rural district's population was 5,951 in 1,272 households. There were 5,683 inhabitants in 1,459 households at the following census of 2011. The 2016 census measured the population of the rural district as 5,296 in 1,518 households. The most populous of its 58 villages was Badeh, with 548 people.

=== Other villages in the rural district ===
- Deh Sefid-e Pain
- Girchan
- Kian Baraftab
- Milmilak
- Mir Ahmadi
- Qaleh-ye Ali
- Taleqan
- Zardabad
