= Chubar Rural District (Shaft County) =

Rural district in Gilan province, Iran

Chubar Rural District Persian: دهستان چوبر
- Rural District
- Location within Iran
- Coordinates: 37°03′N 49°24′E
- Country: Iran
- Province: Gilan
- County: Shaft
- District: Ahmadsargurab
- Established: 1987
- Capital: Chubar

Population (2016)
  - Total: 10,053
- Time zone: UTC+3:30 (IRST)

Chubar Rural District (Persian: دهستان چوبر) is in Ahmadsargurab District of Shaft County, Gilan province, Iran. Its capital is the village of Chubar.

== Demographics ==
=== Population ===
At the time of the 2006 National Census, the rural district's population was 12,845 in 3,417 households. There were 10,733 inhabitants in 3,305 households at the following census of 2011. The 2016 census measured the population of the rural district as 10,053 in 3,548 households. The most populous of its 35 villages was Chubar, with 1,069 people.

=== Other villages in the rural district ===
- Bijar Sar
- Dorudkhan
- Emamzadeh Ebrahim
- Lasak
- Lifkuh
- Mirsara
- Palangposht
- Seleh Marz
- Visrud
