= Jirdeh Rural District =

Rural district in Gilan province, Iran

Jirdeh Rural District Persian: دهستان جيرده
- Rural District
- Location within Iran
- Coordinates: 37°08′N 49°28′E
- Country: Iran
- Province: Gilan
- County: Shaft
- District: Central
- Established: 1987
- Capital: Jirdeh

Population (2016)
  - Total: 13,211
- Time zone: UTC+3:30 (IRST)

Jirdeh Rural District (Persian: دهستان جيرده) is in the Central District of Shaft County, Gilan province, Iran. Its capital is the village of Jirdeh.

== Demographics ==
=== Population ===
At the time of the 2006 National Census, the rural district's population was 16,565 in 4,185 households. There were 15,724 inhabitants in 4,815 households at the following census of 2011. The 2016 census measured the population of the rural district as 13,211 in 4,577 households. The most populous of its 31 villages was Jirdeh, with 1,449 people.

=== Other villages in the rural district ===
- Chomacha
- Khortum
- Kuzan
- Mardekheh
- Nehzom-e Seyqal Kumeh
- Osmavandan
- Shaldeh
- Zowl Piran
