= Ahmadsargurab District =

District in Gilan province, Iran

Ahmadsargurab District Persian: بخش احمدسرگوراب
- District
- Location within Iran
- Coordinates: 37°03′N 49°20′E
- Country: Iran
- Province: Gilan
- County: Shaft
- Established: 1995
- Capital: Ahmadsargurab

Population (2016)
  - Total: 21,823
- Time zone: UTC+3:30 (IRST)

Ahmadsargurab District (Persian: بخش احمدسرگوراب) is in Shaft County, Gilan province, Iran. Its capital is the city of Ahmadsargurab.

== Demographics ==
=== Population ===
At the time of the 2006 National Census, the district's population was 28,056 in 7,273 households. The following census in 2011 counted 24,656 people in 7,408 households. The 2016 census measured the population of the district as 21,823 inhabitants in 7,472 households.

=== Administrative divisions ===
Ahmadsargurab District Population
Administrative Divisions	2006	2011	2016
Ahmadsargurab RD	12,988	11,577	9,642
Chubar RD	12,845	10,733	10,053
Ahmadsargurab (city)	2,223	2,346	2,128
Total	28,056	24,656	21,823
RD = Rural District
