= Central District (Shaft County) =

District in Gilan province, Iran

Central District (Shaft County) Persian: بخش مرکزی شهرستان شفت
- District
- Location within Iran
- Coordinates: 37°10′N 49°28′E
- Country: Iran
- Province: Gilan
- County: Shaft
- Established: 1995
- Capital: Shaft

Population (2016)
  - Total: 32,403
- Time zone: UTC+3:30 (IRST)

The Central District of Shaft County (Persian: بخش مرکزی شهرستان شفت) is in Gilan province, Iran. Its capital is the city of Shaft.

== Demographics ==
=== Population ===
According to the 2006 National Census, the district's population was 35,319, living in 9,193 households. The 2011 census reported a population of 33,887 people in 10,386 households. The most recent census in 2016 recorded the population at 32,403 inhabitants across 10,944 households.

=== Administrative divisions ===
Central District (Shaft County) Population
Administrative Divisions	2006	2011	2016
Jirdeh RD	16,565	15,724	13,211
Molla Sara RD	12,596	11,630	11,008
Shaft (city)	6,158	6,533	8,184
Total	35,319	33,887	32,403
RD = Rural District
