= Zagheh District =

District in Lorestan province, Iran

Zagheh District Persian: بخش زاغه
- District
- Location within Iran
- Coordinates: 33°30′N 48°46′E
- Country: Iran
- Province: Lorestan
- County: Khorramabad
- Capital: Zagheh

Population (2016)
  - Total: 17,440
- Time zone: UTC+3:30 (IRST)

Zagheh District (Persian: بخش زاغه) is in Khorramabad County, Lorestan province, Iran. Its capital is the city of Zagheh.

== Demographics ==
=== Population ===
At the time of the 2006 National Census, the district's population was 19,273 in 4,127 households. The following census in 2011 counted 16,869 people in 4,332 households. The 2016 census measured the population of the district as 17,440 inhabitants in 4,909 households.

=== Administrative divisions ===
Zagheh District Population
Administrative Divisions	2006	2011	2016
Qaedrahmat RD	7,381	6,449	6,108
Razan RD	3,102	2,052	3,260
Zagheh RD	5,951	5,683	5,296
Zagheh (city)	2,839	2,685	2,776
Total	19,273	16,869	17,440
RD = Rural District
