= Shaft County =

County in Gilan province, Iran

Shaft County Persian: شهرستان شفت
- County
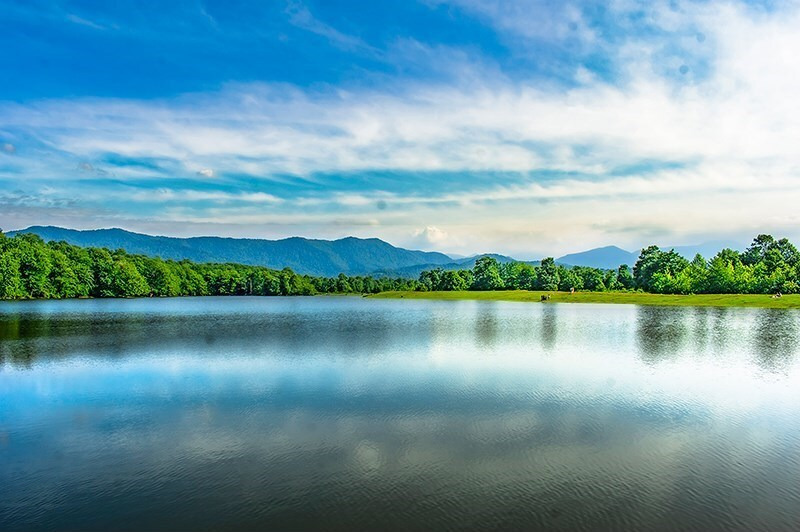

- Location of Shaft County in Gilan province (center left, purple)

- Location of Gilan province in Iran
- Coordinates: 37°07′N 49°22′E
- Country: Iran
- Province: Gilan
- Established: 1995
- Capital: Shaft
- Districts: Central, Ahmadsargurab

Population (2016)
  - Total: 54,226
- Time zone: UTC+3:30 (IRST)

Shaft County (Persian: شهرستان شفت) is in Gilan province, Iran. Its capital is the city of Shaft.

== Demographics ==
=== Population ===
At the time of the 2006 National Census, the county's population was 63,375 in 16,466 households. The following census in 2011 counted 58,543 people in 17,790 households. The 2016 census measured the population of the county as 54,226 in 18,416 households.

=== Administrative divisions ===
Shaft County's population history and administrative structure over three consecutive censuses are shown in the following table.

Shaft County Population
Administrative Divisions	2006	2011	2016
Central District	35,319	33,887	32,403
Jirdeh RD	16,565	15,724	13,211
Molla Sara RD	12,596	11,630	11,008
Shaft (city)	6,158	6,533	8,184
Ahmadsargurab District	28,056	24,656	21,823
Ahmadsargurab RD	12,988	11,577	9,642
Chubar RD	12,845	10,733	10,053
Ahmadsargurab (city)	2,223	2,346	2,128
Total	63,375	58,543	54,226
RD = Rural District

== See also ==
Media related to Shaft County at Wikimedia Commons
