= Bishehgah =

Village in Gilan province, Iran

Bishehgah Persian: بيشه گاه
- Village
- Location within Iran
- Coordinates: 37°25′23″N 49°10′42″E
- Country: Iran
- Province: Gilan
- County: Sowme'eh Sara
- District: Ziabar
- Rural District: Bahambar

Population (2016)
  - Total: 270
- Time zone: UTC+3:30 (IRST)

Bishehgah (Persian: بيشه گاه) (Note: Also romanized as Bīshehgāh; also known as Vīshkā) is a village in, and the capital of, Bahambar Rural District in Ziabar District of Sowme'eh Sara County, Gilan province, Iran.

== Demographics ==
=== Population ===
At the time of the 2006 National Census, the village's population was 349 in 79 households, when it was in Ziabar Rural District of the Central District. The following census in 2011 counted 308 people in 85 households. The 2016 census measured the population of the village as 270 people in 90 households.

After the census, the rural district was separated from the district in the formation of Ziabar District. Bishehgah was transferred to Bahambar Rural District created in the new district.
