= Maaf Vaziri =

Village in Gilan province, Iran

Maaf Vaziri Persian: معاف وزيري
- Village
- Location within Iran
- Coordinates: 37°24′02″N 49°11′41″E
- Country: Iran
- Province: Gilan
- County: Sowme'eh Sara
- District: Ziabar
- Rural District: Bahambar

Population (2016)
  - Total: 119
- Time zone: UTC+3:30 (IRST)

Maaf Vaziri (Persian: معاف وزيري) (Note: Also romanized as Ma‘āf Vazīrī; also known as Armanī Maḩalleh and Ma‘āf) is a village in Bahambar Rural District of Ziabar District in Sowme'eh Sara County, Gilan province, Iran.

== Demographics ==
=== Population ===
At the time of the 2006 National Census, the village's population was 137 in 37 households, when it was in Ziabar Rural District of the Central District. The following census in 2011 counted 115 people in 36 households. The 2016 census measured the population of the village as 119 people in 42 households.

After the census, the rural district was separated from the district in the formation of Ziabar District. Maaf Vaziri was transferred to Bahambar Rural District created in the new district.
