= Qaraba =

Village in Gilan province, Iran

Qaraba Persian: قرابا
- Village
- Location within Iran
- Coordinates: 37°26′45″N 49°16′00″E
- Country: Iran
- Province: Gilan
- County: Sowme'eh Sara
- District: Ziabar
- Rural District: Bahambar

Population (2016)
  - Total: 566
- Time zone: UTC+3:30 (IRST)

Qaraba (Persian: قرابا) (Note: Also romanized as Qarābā and Qorābā’; also known as Kuraba) is a village in Bahambar Rural District of Ziabar District in Sowme'eh Sara County, Gilan province, Iran.

== Demographics ==
=== Population ===
At the time of the 2006 National Census, the village's population was 684 in 211 households, when it was in Ziabar Rural District of the Central District. The following census in 2011 counted 643 people in 227 households. The 2016 census measured the population of the village as 566 people in 211 households.

After the census, the rural district was separated from the district in the formation of Ziabar District. Qaraba was transferred to Bahambar Rural District created in the new district.
