= Mazandaran Mahalleh =

Mazandaran Mahalleh or Mazanderan Mahalleh (Persian: مازندران محله) may refer to:

- Mazandaran Mahalleh, Gilan
- Mazandaran Mahalleh-ye Bahambar, Gilan Province
- Mazandaran Mahalleh Beham Bar, alternate name of Jirsar-e Bahambar, Gilan Province
- Mazandaran Mahalleh, Mazandaran
