= Talesh Mahalleh-ye Bahambar =

Village in Gilan province, Iran

Talesh Mahalleh-ye Bahambar Persian: طالش محله بهمبر
- Village
- Location within Iran
- Country: Iran
- Province: Gilan
- County: Sowme'eh Sara
- District: Ziabar
- Rural District: Bahambar

Population (2016)
  - Total: 83
- Time zone: UTC+3:30 (IRST)

Talesh Mahalleh-ye Bahambar (Persian: طالش محله بهمبر) (Note: Also romanized as Ţālesh Maḩalleh-ye Bahambar; also known as Goldasht and Ţālesh Maḩalleh) is a village in Bahambar Rural District of Ziabar District in Sowme'eh Sara County, Gilan province, Iran.

== Demographics ==
=== Population ===
At the time of the 2006 National Census, the village's population was 124 in 30 households, when it was in Ziabar Rural District of the Central District. The following census in 2011 counted 243 people in 27 households. The 2016 census measured the population of the village as 83 people in 21 households.

After the census, the rural district was separated from the district in the formation of Ziabar District. Talesh Mahalleh-ye Bahambar was transferred to Bahambar Rural District created in the new district.
