= Khalifeh Kenar =

Village in Gilan province, Iran

Khalifeh Kenar Persian: خليفه كنار
- Village
- Location within Iran
- Coordinates: 37°24′40″N 49°12′05″E
- Country: Iran
- Province: Gilan
- County: Sowme'eh Sara
- District: Ziabar
- Rural District: Bahambar

Population (2016)
  - Total: 227
- Time zone: UTC+3:30 (IRST)

Khalifeh Kenar (Persian: خليفه كنار) (Note: Also romanized as Khalīfeh Kenār and Khalīfehkanār) is a village in Bahambar Rural District of Ziabar District in Sowme'eh Sara County, Gilan province, Iran.

== Demographics ==
=== Population ===
At the time of the 2006 National Census, the village's population was 241 in 63 households, when it was in Ziabar Rural District of the Central District. The following census in 2011 counted 247 people in 81 households. The 2016 census measured the population of the village as 227 people in 70 households.

After the census, the rural district was separated from the district in the formation of Ziabar District. Khalifeh Kenar was transferred to Bahambar Rural District created in the new district.
