= Lalom =

Village in Gilan province, Iran

Lalom Persian: لالم
- Village
- Location within Iran
- Coordinates: 37°25′012″N 49°13′06″E
- Country: Iran
- Province: Gilan
- County: Sowme'eh Sara
- District: Ziabar
- Rural District: Bahambar

Population (2016)
  - Total: 310
- Time zone: UTC+3:30 (IRST)

Lalom (Persian: لالم) (Note: Also romanized as Lālom) is a village in Bahambar Rural District of Ziabar District in Sowme'eh Sara County, Gilan province, Iran.

== Demographics ==
=== Population ===
At the time of the 2006 National Census, the village's population was 418 in 126 households, when it was in Ziabar Rural District of the Central District. The following census in 2011 counted 325 people in 115 households. The 2016 census measured the population of the village as 310 people in 108 households.

After the census, the rural district was separated from the district in the formation of Ziabar District. Lalom was transferred to Bahambar Rural District created in the new district.
