= Shaft Mahalleh =

Village in Gilan province, Iran

Shaft Mahalleh Persian: شفت محله
- Village
- Location within Iran
- Coordinates: 37°25′56″N 49°13′21″E
- Country: Iran
- Province: Gilan
- County: Sowme'eh Sara
- District: Ziabar
- Rural District: Bahambar

Population (2016)
  - Total: 117
- Time zone: UTC+3:30 (IRST)

Shaft Mahalleh (Persian: شفت محله) (Note: Also romanized as Shaft Maḩalleh) is a village in Bahambar Rural District of Ziabar District in Sowme'eh Sara County, Gilan province, Iran.

== Demographics ==
=== Population ===
At the time of the 2006 National Census, the village's population was 169 in 49 households, when it was in Ziabar Rural District of the Central District. The following census in 2011 counted 150 people in 48 households. The 2016 census measured the population of the village as 117 people in 38 households.

After the census, the rural district was separated from the district in the formation of Ziabar District. Shaft Mahalleh was transferred to Bahambar Rural District created in the new district.
