= Larsar =

Village in Gilan province, Iran

Larsar Persian: لارسر
- Village
- Location within Iran
- Coordinates: 37°28′40″N 49°10′06″E
- Country: Iran
- Province: Gilan
- County: Sowme'eh Sara
- District: Ziabar
- Rural District: Bahambar

Population (2016)
  - Total: 159
- Time zone: UTC+3:30 (IRST)

Larsar (Persian: لارسر) (Note: Also romanized as Lārsar) is a village in Bahambar Rural District of Ziabar District in Sowme'eh Sara County, Gilan province, Iran.

== Demographics ==
=== Population ===
At the time of the 2006 National Census, the village's population was 257 in 69 households, when it was in Ziabar Rural District of the Central District. The following census in 2011 counted 388 people in 115 households. The 2016 census measured the population of the village as 159 people in 62 households.

After the census, the rural district was separated from the district in the formation of Ziabar District. Larsar was transferred to Bahambar Rural District created in the new district.
