= Bishehgah-e Bahambar =

Village in Gilan province, Iran

Bishehgah-e Bahambar Persian: بيشه گاه بهمبر
- Village
- Location within Iran
- Coordinates: 37°27′17″N 49°14′47″E
- Country: Iran
- Province: Gilan
- County: Sowme'eh Sara
- District: Ziabar
- Rural District: Bahambar

Population (2016)
  - Total: 372
- Time zone: UTC+3:30 (IRST)

Bishehgah-e Bahambar (Persian: بيشه گاه بهمبر) (Note: Also romanized as Bīshehgāh-e Bahambar) is a village in Bahambar Rural District of Ziabar District in Sowme'eh Sara County, Gilan province, Iran.

== Demographics ==
=== Population ===
At the time of the 2006 National Census, the village's population was 504 in 150 households, when it was in Ziabar Rural District of the Central District. The following census in 2011 counted 441 people in 132 households. The 2016 census measured the population of the village as 372 people in 130 households.

After the census, the rural district was separated from the district in the formation of Ziabar District. Bishehgah-e Bahambar was transferred to Bahambar Rural District created in the new district.
