= Khoshk-e Rudbar =

Village in Gilan province, Iran

Khoshk-e Rudbar Persian: خشك رودبار
- Village
- Location within Iran
- Coordinates: 37°24′39″N 49°10′41″E
- Country: Iran
- Province: Gilan
- County: Sowme'eh Sara
- District: Ziabar
- Rural District: Bahambar

Population (2016)
  - Total: 345
- Time zone: UTC+3:30 (IRST)

Khoshk-e Rudbar (Persian: خشك رودبار) (Note: Also romanized as Khoshk-e Rūdbār) is a village in Bahambar Rural District of Ziabar District in Sowme'eh Sara County, Gilan province, Iran.

== Demographics ==
=== Population ===
At the time of the 2006 National Census, the village's population was 419 in 108 households, when it was in Ziabar Rural District of the Central District. The following census in 2011 counted 406 people in 118 households. The 2016 census measured the population of the village as 345 people in 110 households.

After the census, the rural district was separated from the district in the formation of Ziabar District. Khoshk-e Rudbar was transferred to Bahambar Rural District created in the new district.
