= Bahambar =

Village in Gilan province, Iran

Bahambar Persian: بهمبر
- Village
- Location within Iran
- Coordinates: 37°27′45″N 49°14′59″E
- Country: Iran
- Province: Gilan
- County: Sowme'eh Sara
- District: Ziabar
- Rural District: Bahambar

Population (2016)
  - Total: 122
- Time zone: UTC+3:30 (IRST)

Bahambar (Persian: بهمبر) (Note: Also romanized as Baham Bar; also known as Bakhambar) is a village in Bahambar Rural District of Ziabar District in Sowme'eh Sara County, Gilan province, Iran.

== Demographics ==
=== Population ===
At the time of the 2006 National Census, the village's population was 174 in 47 households, when it was in Ziabar Rural District of the Central District. The following census in 2011 counted 159 people in 48 households. The 2016 census measured the population of the village as 122 people in 44 households.

After the census, the rural district was separated from the district in the formation of Ziabar District. Bahambar was transferred to Bahambar Rural District created in the new district.
