= Esfaqansar =

Village in Gilan province, Iran

Esfaqansar Persian: اسفقن سر
- Village
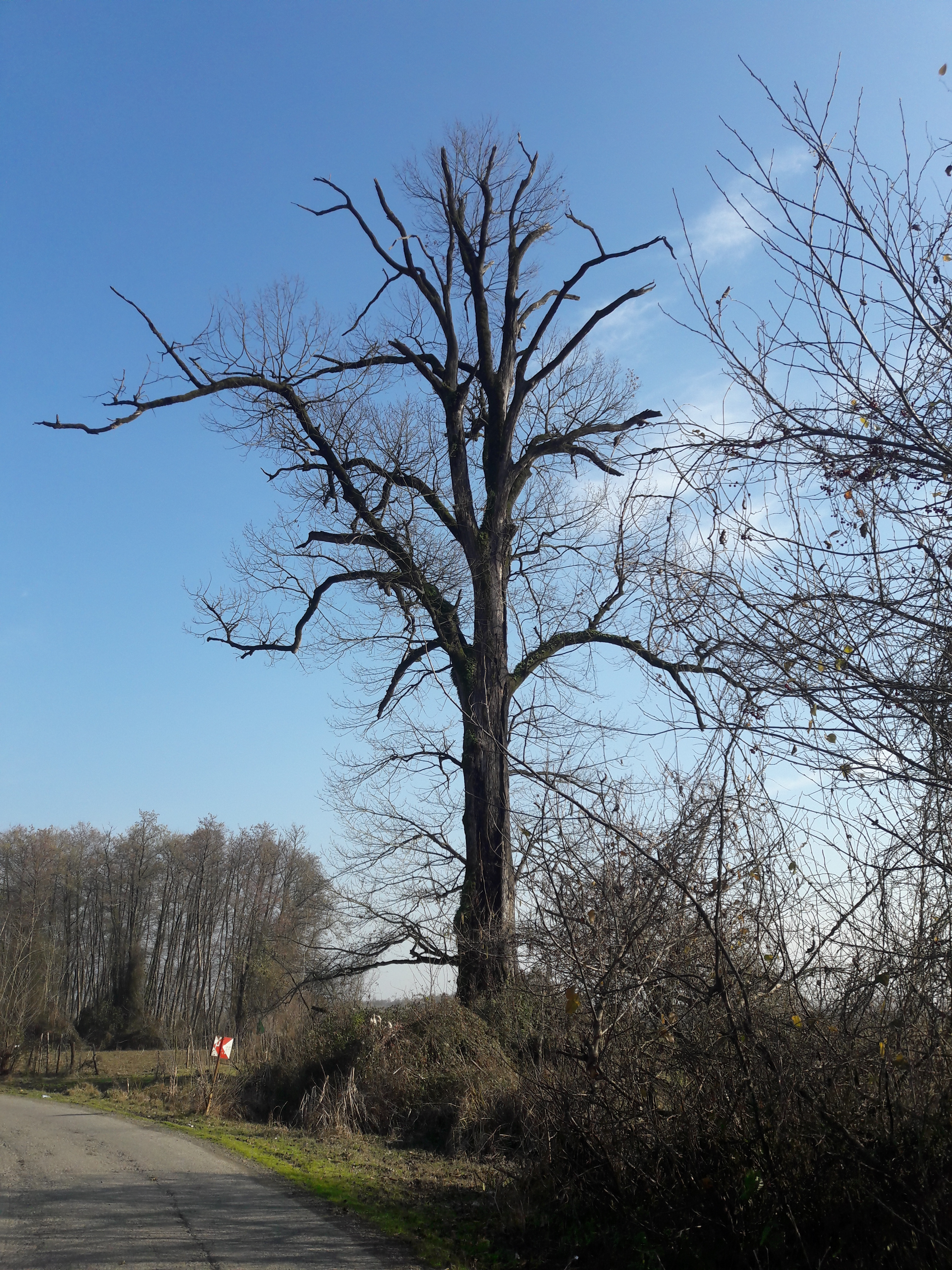
- Cemetery in the village of Esfaqansar

- Location within Iran
- Coordinates: 37°26′09″N 49°12′30″E
- Country: Iran
- Province: Gilan
- County: Sowme'eh Sara
- District: Ziabar
- Rural District: Bahambar

Population (2016)
  - Total: 104
- Time zone: UTC+3:30 (IRST)

Esfaqansar (Persian: اسفقن سر) (Note: Also romanized as Esfaqan Sar; also known as Esqafansar) is a village in Bahambar Rural District of Ziabar District in Sowme'eh Sara County, Gilan province, Iran.

== Demographics ==
=== Population ===
At the time of the 2006 National Census, the village's population was 114 in 34 households, when it was in Ziabar Rural District of the Central District. The following census in 2011 counted 101 people in 31 households. The 2016 census measured the population of the village as 104 people in 35 households.

After the census, the rural district was separated from the district in the formation of Ziabar District. Esfaqansar was transferred to Bahambar Rural District created in the new district.
