= Mian Gaskar =

Village in Gilan province, Iran

Mian Gaskar Persian: ميان گسكر
- Village
- Location within Iran
- Coordinates: 37°24′52″N 49°11′41″E
- Country: Iran
- Province: Gilan
- County: Sowme'eh Sara
- District: Ziabar
- Rural District: Bahambar

Population (2016)
  - Total: 257
- Time zone: UTC+3:30 (IRST)

Mian Gaskar (Persian: ميان گسكر) (Note: Also romanized as Miangaskar, Mīāngaskar and Meyān Gaskar) is a village in Bahambar Rural District of Ziabar District in Sowme'eh Sara County, Gilan province, Iran.

== Demographics ==
=== Population ===
At the time of the 2006 National Census, the village's population was 331 in 94 households, when it was in Ziabar Rural District of the Central District. The following census in 2011 counted 291 people in 95 households. The 2016 census measured the population of the village as 257 people in 88 households.

After the census, the rural district was separated from the district in the formation of Ziabar District. Mian Gaskar was transferred to Bahambar Rural District created in the new district.
