= Saremeh =

Village in Gilan province, Iran

Saremeh Persian: سارمه
- Village
- Location within Iran
- Coordinates: 37°26′06″N 49°11′41″E
- Country: Iran
- Province: Gilan
- County: Sowme'eh Sara
- District: Ziabar
- Rural District: Bahambar

Population (2016)
  - Total: 265
- Time zone: UTC+3:30 (IRST)

Saremeh (Persian: سارمه) (Note: Also romanized as Sāremeh) is a village in Bahambar Rural District of Ziabar District in Sowme'eh Sara County, Gilan province, Iran.

== Demographics ==
=== Population ===
At the time of the 2006 National Census, the village's population was 311 in 76 households, when it was in Ziabar Rural District of the Central District. The following census in 2011 counted 270 people in 81 households. The 2016 census measured the population of the village as 265 people in 82 households.

After the census, the rural district was separated from the district in the formation of Ziabar District. Saremeh was transferred to Bahambar Rural District created in the new district.
