= Aqa Mahalleh-ye Bahambar =

Village in Gilan province, Iran

Aqa Mahalleh-ye Bahambar Persian: اقامحله بهمبر
- Village
- Location within Iran
- Coordinates: 37°27′46″N 49°13′50″E
- Country: Iran
- Province: Gilan
- County: Sowme'eh Sara
- District: Ziabar
- Rural District: Bahambar

Population (2016)
  - Total: 108
- Time zone: UTC+3:30 (IRST)

Aqa Mahalleh-ye Bahambar (Persian: اقامحله بهمبر) (Note: Also romanized as Āqā Maḩalleh-ye Bahambar) is a village in Bahambar Rural District of Ziabar District in Sowme'eh Sara County, Gilan province, Iran.

== Demographics ==
=== Population ===
At the time of the 2006 National Census, the village's population was 191 in 50 households, when it was in Ziabar Rural District of the Central District. The following census in 2011 counted 154 people in 45 households. The 2016 census measured the population of the village as 108 people in 41 households.

After the census, the rural district was separated from the district in the formation of Ziabar District. Aqa Mahalleh-ye Bahambar was transferred to Bahambar Rural District created in the new district.
