= Eram Sadat =

Village in Gilan province, Iran

Eram Sadat Persian: ارم سادات
- Village
- Location within Iran
- Coordinates: 37°26′45″N 49°14′53″E
- Country: Iran
- Province: Gilan
- County: Sowme'eh Sara
- District: Ziabar
- Rural District: Bahambar

Population (2016)
  - Total: 154
- Time zone: UTC+3:30 (IRST)

Eram Sadat (Persian: ارم سادات) (Note: Also romanized as Eram Sādāt) is a village in Bahambar Rural District of Ziabar District in Sowme'eh Sara County, Gilan province, Iran.

== Demographics ==
=== Population ===
At the time of the 2006 National Census, the village's population was 233 in 72 households, when it was in Ziabar Rural District of the Central District. The following census in 2011 counted 182 people in 60 households. The 2016 census measured the population of the village as 154 people in 62 households.

After the census, the rural district was separated from the district in the formation of Ziabar District. Eram Sadat was transferred to Bahambar Rural District created in the new district.
