= Bijarkan, Sowme'eh Sara =

Village in Gilan province, Iran

Bijarkan Persian: بيجاركن
- Village
- Location within Iran
- Coordinates: 37°27′44″N 49°11′31″E
- Country: Iran
- Province: Gilan
- County: Sowme'eh Sara
- District: Ziabar
- Rural District: Bahambar

Population (2016)
  - Total: 172
- Time zone: UTC+3:30 (IRST)

Bijarkan (Persian: بيجاركن) (Note: Also romanized as Bījār Kan and Bījārkan) is a village in Bahambar Rural District of Ziabar District in Sowme'eh Sara County, Gilan province, Iran.

== Demographics ==
=== Population ===
At the time of the 2006 National Census, the village's population was 201 in 42 households, when it was in Ziabar Rural District of the Central District. The following census in 2011 counted 192 people in 50 households. The 2016 census measured the population of the village as 172 people in 53 households.

After the census, the rural district was separated from the district in the formation of Ziabar District. Bijarkan was transferred to Bahambar Rural District created in the new district.
