= Now Pashan =

Village in Gilan province, Iran

Now Pashan Persian: نوپاشان
- Village
- Location within Iran
- Coordinates: 37°26′10″N 49°15′30″E
- Country: Iran
- Province: Gilan
- County: Sowme'eh Sara
- District: Ziabar
- Rural District: Ziabar

Population (2016)
  - Total: 342
- Time zone: UTC+3:30 (IRST)

Now Pashan (Persian: نوپاشان) (Note: Also romanized as Now Pāshān; also known as Now Pūshān) is a village in Ziabar Rural District of Ziabar District in Sowme'eh Sara County, Gilan province, Iran.

== Demographics ==
=== Population ===
At the time of the 2006 National Census, the village's population was 275 in 79 households, when it was in the Central District. The following census in 2011 counted 407 people in 123 households. The 2016 census measured the population of the village as 342 people in 121 households.

In 2021, the rural district was separated from the district in the formation of Ziabar District.
