= Azgom =

Village in Gilan province, Iran

Azgom Persian: ازگُم
- Village
- Location within Iran
- Coordinates: 37°20′47″N 49°20′32″E
- Country: Iran
- Province: Gilan
- County: Sowme'eh Sara
- District: Central
- Rural District: Pishkhan

Population (2016)
  - Total: 241
- Time zone: UTC+3:30 (IRST)

Azgom (Persian: ازگُم) is a village in Pishkhan Rural District of the Central District in Sowme'eh Sara County, Gilan province, Iran.

== Demographics ==
=== Population ===
At the time of the 2006 National Census, the village's population was 384 in 128 households, when it was in Kasma Rural District. The following census in 2011 counted 309 people in 101 households. The 2016 census measured the population of the village as 241 people in 94 households.

In 2021, Azgom was transferred to Pishkhan Rural District created in the same district.
