= Qazdeh =

Village in Gilan province, Iran

Qazdeh Persian: قاضده
- Village
- Location within Iran
- Coordinates: 37°23′03″N 49°21′09″E
- Country: Iran
- Province: Gilan
- County: Sowme'eh Sara
- District: Central
- Rural District: Pishkhan

Population (2016)
  - Total: 172
- Time zone: UTC+3:30 (IRST)

Qazdeh (Persian: قاضده) (Note: Also romanized as Qāẕdeh; also known as Fāẕdeh and Ghāzdeh) is a village in Pishkhan Rural District of the Central District in Sowme'eh Sara County, Gilan province, Iran.

== Demographics ==
=== Population ===
At the time of the 2006 National Census, the village's population was 242 in 61 households, when it was in Kasma Rural District. The following census in 2011 counted 210 people in 60 households. The 2016 census measured the population of the village as 172 people in 61 households.

In 2021, Qazdeh was transferred to Pishkhan Rural District created in the same district.
