= Sang Jub =

Village in Gilan province, Iran

Sang Jub Persian: سنگ جوب
- Village
- Location within Iran
- Coordinates: 37°21′11″N 49°21′03″E
- Country: Iran
- Province: Gilan
- County: Sowme'eh Sara
- District: Central
- Rural District: Pishkhan

Population (2016)
  - Total: 261
- Time zone: UTC+3:30 (IRST)

Sang Jub (Persian: سنگ جوب) (Note: Also romanized as Sang Jūb; also known as Sangchūb) is a village in Pishkhan Rural District of the Central District in Sowme'eh Sara County, Gilan province, Iran.

== Demographics ==
=== Population ===
At the time of the 2006 National Census, the village's population was 427 in 121 households, when it was in Kasma Rural District. The following census in 2011 counted 352 people in 111 households. The 2016 census measured the population of the village as 261 people in 100 households.

In 2021, Sang Jub was transferred to Pishkhan Rural District created in the same district.
