= Giaku =

Village in Gilan province, Iran

Giaku Persian: گياكو
- Village
- Location within Iran
- Coordinates: 37°21′56″N 49°20′32″E
- Country: Iran
- Province: Gilan
- County: Sowme'eh Sara
- District: Central
- Rural District: Pishkhan

Population (2016)
  - Total: 58
- Time zone: UTC+3:30 (IRST)

Giaku (Persian: گياكو) (Note: Also romanized as Gīākū) is a village in Pishkhan Rural District of the Central District in Sowme'eh Sara County, Gilan province, Iran.

== Demographics ==
=== Population ===
At the time of the 2006 National Census, the village's population was 105 in 30 households, when it was in Kasma Rural District. The following census in 2011 counted 75 people in 23 households. The 2016 census measured the population of the village as 58 people in 22 households.

In 2021, Giaku was transferred to Pishkhan Rural District created in the same district.
