= Kharaf Kam =

Village in Gilan province, Iran

Kharaf Kam Persian: خرف كام
- Village
- Location within Iran
- Coordinates: 37°20′09″N 49°20′46″E
- Country: Iran
- Province: Gilan
- County: Sowme'eh Sara
- District: Central
- Rural District: Pishkhan

Population (2016)
  - Total: 59
- Time zone: UTC+3:30 (IRST)

Kharaf Kam (Persian: خرف كام) (Note: Also romanized as Kharaf Kām, Kharfakām, Kharfekām, Kharfkām, and Kherfakan; also known as Kharfeh Kām) is a village in Pishkhan Rural District of the Central District in Sowme'eh Sara County, Gilan province, Iran.

== Demographics ==
=== Population ===
At the time of the 2006 National Census, the village's population was 77 in 20 households, when it was in Kasma Rural District. The following census in 2011 counted 61 people in 19 households. The 2016 census measured the population of the village as 59 people in 21 households.

In 2021, Kharaf Kam was transferred to Pishkhan Rural District created in the same district.
