= Kolsar =

Village in Gilan province, Iran

Kolsar Persian: كلسر
- Village
- Location within Iran
- Coordinates: 37°22′46″N 49°19′36″E
- Country: Iran
- Province: Gilan
- County: Sowme'eh Sara
- District: Central
- Rural District: Pishkhan

Population (2016)
  - Total: 268
- Time zone: UTC+3:30 (IRST)

Kolsar (Persian: كلسر) (Note: Also romanized as Kal Sar; also known as Kalleh Sar, Kol Sar-e Bālā, and Koliser) is a village in Pishkhan Rural District of the Central District in Sowme'eh Sara County, Gilan province, Iran.

== Demographics ==
=== Population ===
At the time of the 2006 National Census, the village's population was 424 in 117 households, when it was in Kasma Rural District. The following census in 2011 counted 294 people in 95 households. The 2016 census measured the population of the village as 268 people in 89 households.

In 2021, Kolsar was transferred to Pishkhan Rural District created in the same district.
