= Chomesqal =

Village in Gilan province, Iran

Chomesqal Persian: چمثقال
- Village
- Location within Iran
- Coordinates: 37°22′15″N 49°22′03″E
- Country: Iran
- Province: Gilan
- County: Sowme'eh Sara
- District: Central
- Rural District: Pishkhan

Population (2016)
  - Total: 523
- Time zone: UTC+3:30 (IRST)

Chomesqal (Persian: چمثقال) (Note: Also romanized as Chams̄aqāl and Chomes̄qāl; also known as Chūmes̄qāl) is a village in Pishkhan Rural District of the Central District in Sowme'eh Sara County, Gilan province, Iran.

== Demographics ==
=== Population ===
At the time of the 2006 National Census, the village's population was 539 in 162 households, when it was in Kasma Rural District. The following census in 2011 counted 509 people in 175 households. The 2016 census measured the population of the village as 523 people in 212 households.

In 2021, Chomesqal was transferred to Pishkhan Rural District created in the same district.
