= Jirsar-e Nowdeh =

Village in Gilan province, Iran

Jirsar-e Nowdeh Persian: جيرسرنوده
- Village
- Location within Iran
- Coordinates: 37°25′56″N 49°16′40″E
- Country: Iran
- Province: Gilan
- County: Sowme'eh Sara
- District: Ziabar
- Rural District: Ziabar

Population (2016)
  - Total: 137
- Time zone: UTC+3:30 (IRST)

Jirsar-e Nowdeh (Persian: جيرسرنوده) (Note: Also romanized as Jīrsar-e Nowdeh; also known as Jīreh Sar) is a village in Ziabar Rural District of Ziabar District in Sowme'eh Sara County, Gilan province, Iran.

== Demographics ==
=== Population ===
At the time of the 2006 National Census, the village's population was 159 in 49 households, when it was in the Central District. The following census in 2011 counted 146 people in 51 households. The 2016 census measured the population of the village as 137 people in 49 households.

In 2021, the rural district was separated from the district in the formation of Ziabar District.
