= Mazandaran Mahalleh-ye Bahambar =

Village in Gilan province, Iran

Mazandaran Mahalleh-ye Bahambar Persian: مازندران محله بهمبر
- Village
- Location within Iran
- Coordinates: 37°27′17″N 49°14′50″E
- Country: Iran
- Province: Gilan
- County: Sowme'eh Sara
- District: Ziabar
- Rural District: Bahambar

Population (2016)
  - Total: 215
- Time zone: UTC+3:30 (IRST)

Mazandaran Mahalleh-ye Bahambar (Persian: مازندران محله بهمبر) (Note: Also romanized as Māzandarān Maḩalleh-ye Bahambar; also known as Baham Bar) is a village in Bahambar Rural District of Ziabar District in Sowme'eh Sara County, Gilan province, Iran.

== Demographics ==
=== Population ===
At the time of the 2006 National Census, the village's population was 227 in 65 households, when it was in Ziabar Rural District of the Central District. The following census in 2011 counted 197 people in 56 households. The 2016 census measured the population of the village as 215 people in 72 households.

After the census, the rural district was separated from the district in the formation of Ziabar District. Mazandaran Mahalleh-ye Bahambar was transferred to Bahambar Rural District created in the new district.
