= Chakuvar =

Village in Gilan province, Iran

Chakuvar Persian: چكوور
- Village
- Location within Iran
- Coordinates: 37°23′42″N 49°17′15″E
- Country: Iran
- Province: Gilan
- County: Sowme'eh Sara
- District: Ziabar
- Rural District: Ziabar

Population (2016)
  - Total: 430
- Time zone: UTC+3:30 (IRST)

Chakuvar (Persian: چكوور) (Note: Also romanized as Chakūvar and Chekūver; also known as Chekover and Chekuper) is a village in, and the capital of, Ziabar Rural District in Ziabar District of Sowme'eh Sara County, Gilan province, Iran. The previous capital of the rural district was the village of Ziabar, now a city.

== Demographics ==
=== Population ===
At the time of the 2006 National Census, the village's population was 548 in 150 households, when it was in the Central District. The following census in 2011 counted 480 people in 157 households. The 2016 census measured the population of the village as 430 people in 150 households.

In 2021, the rural district was separated from the district in the formation of Ziabar District.
