= Cheneh Sar =

Village in Gilan province, Iran

Cheneh Sar Persian: چنه سر
- Village
- Location within Iran
- Coordinates: 37°18′28″N 49°20′53″E
- Country: Iran
- Province: Gilan
- County: Sowme'eh Sara
- District: Central
- Rural District: Pishkhan

Population (2016)
  - Total: 239
- Time zone: UTC+3:30 (IRST)

Cheneh Sar (Persian: چنه سر) is a village in Pishkhan Rural District of the Central District in Sowme'eh Sara County, Gilan province, Iran.

== Demographics ==
=== Population ===
At the time of the 2006 National Census, the village's population was 214 in 61 households, when it was in Kasma Rural District. The following census in 2011 counted 225 people in 71 households. The 2016 census measured the population of the village as 239 people in 89 households.

In 2021, Cheneh Sar was transferred to Pishkhan Rural District created in the same district.
