= Pishkhan =

Village in Gilan province, Iran

Pishkhan Persian: پيشخان
- Village
- Location within Iran
- Coordinates: 37°20′09″N 49°19′37″E
- Country: Iran
- Province: Gilan
- County: Sowme'eh Sara
- District: Central
- Rural District: Pishkhan

Population (2016)
  - Total: 607
- Time zone: UTC+3:30 (IRST)

Pishkhan (Persian: پيشخان) (Note: Also romanized as Pīshkhān) is a village in, and the capital of, Pishkhan Rural District in the Central District of Sowme'eh Sara County, Gilan province, Iran.

== Demographics ==
=== Population ===
At the time of the 2006 National Census, the village's population was 817 in 243 households, when it was in Kasma Rural District. The following census in 2011 counted 755 people in 254 households. The 2016 census measured the population of the village as 607 people in 239 households.

In 2021, Pishkhan was transferred to Pishkhan Rural District created in the same district.
