= Eslamabad, Gilan =

Village in Gilan province, Iran

Eslamabad Persian: اسلام اباد
- Village
- Location within Iran
- Coordinates: 37°22′25″N 49°21′19″E
- Country: Iran
- Province: Gilan
- County: Sowme'eh Sara
- District: Central
- Rural District: Pishkhan

Population (2016)
  - Total: 258
- Time zone: UTC+3:30 (IRST)

Eslamabad (Persian: اسلام اباد) (Note: Also romanized as Eslāmābād; also known as Gāv Kadeh and Kāvak Deh) is a village in Pishkhan Rural District of the Central District in Sowme'eh Sara County, Gilan province, Iran.

== Demographics ==
=== Population ===
At the time of the 2006 National Census, the village's population was 364 in 100 households, when it was in Kasma Rural District. The following census in 2011 counted 280 people in 88 households. The 2016 census measured the population of the village as 258 people in 98 households.

In 2021, Eslamabad was transferred to Pishkhan Rural District created in the same district.
