= Bisheh Sara =

Village in Gilan province, Iran

Bisheh Sara Persian: بیشه‌سرا
- Village
- Location within Iran
- Coordinates: 37°25′04″N 49°13′56″E
- Country: Iran
- Province: Gilan
- County: Sowme'eh Sara
- District: Ziabar
- Rural District: Ziabar

Population (2016)
  - Total: 92
- Time zone: UTC+3:30 (IRST)

Bisheh Sara (Persian: بیشه‌سرا) (Note: Also romanized as Bīsheh Sarā) is a village in Ziabar Rural District of Ziabar District in Sowme'eh Sara County, Gilan province, Iran.

== Demographics ==
=== Population ===
At the time of the 2006 National Census, the village's population was 114 in 35 households, when it was in the Central District. The following census in 2011 counted 86 people in 27 households. The 2016 census measured the population of the village as 92 people in 30 households.

In 2021, the rural district was separated from the district in the formation of Ziabar District.
