= Jirsar-e Bahambar =

Village in Gilan province, Iran

Jirsar-e Bahambar Persian: جيرسربهمبر
- Village
- Location within Iran
- Coordinates: 37°28′03″N 49°15′31″E
- Country: Iran
- Province: Gilan
- County: Sowme'eh Sara
- District: Ziabar
- Rural District: Bahambar

Population (2016)
  - Total: 16
- Time zone: UTC+3:30 (IRST)

Jirsar-e Bahambar (Persian: جيرسربهمبر) (Note: Also romanized as Jīrsar-e Bahambar; also known as Māzandarān Maḩalleh Beham Bar) is a village in Bahambar Rural District of Ziabar District in Sowme'eh Sara County, Gilan province, Iran.

== Demographics ==
=== Population ===
At the time of the 2006 National Census, the village's population was 41 in 13 households, when it was in Ziabar Rural District of the Central District. The following census in 2011 counted 36 people in 12 households. The 2016 census measured the population of the village as 16 people in seven households.

After the census, the rural district was separated from the district in the formation of Ziabar District. Jirsar-e Bahambar was transferred to Bahambar Rural District created in the new district.
