= Lashmar Zamakh =

Village in Gilan province, Iran

Lashmar Zamakh Persian: لشمرزمخ
- Village
- Location within Iran
- Coordinates: 37°24′12″N 49°18′12″E
- Country: Iran
- Province: Gilan
- County: Sowme'eh Sara
- District: Ziabar
- Rural District: Ziabar

Population (2016)
  - Total: 172
- Time zone: UTC+3:30 (IRST)

Lashmar Zamakh (Persian: لشمرزمخ) (Note: Also romanized as Lash Mar Zomokh and Leshmarzemakh) is a village in Ziabar Rural District of Ziabar District in Sowme'eh Sara County, Gilan province, Iran.

== Demographics ==
=== Population ===
At the time of the 2006 National Census, the village's population was 259 in 77 households, when it was in the Central District. The following census in 2011 counted 227 people in 70 households. The 2016 census measured the population of the village as 172 people in 62 households.

In 2021, the rural district was separated from the district in the formation of Ziabar District.
