= Katemjan =

Katemjan (Persian: كتمجان) may refer to:

- Katemjan-e Yusefali
- Katemjan-e Motamedi
- Katemjan-e Seyyed Abd ol Vahhabi
