= Kohneh Sar =

Village in Gilan province, Iran

Kohneh Sar Persian: كهنه سر
- Village
- Location within Iran
- Coordinates: 37°19′27″N 49°20′15″E
- Country: Iran
- Province: Gilan
- County: Sowme'eh Sara
- District: Central
- Rural District: Pishkhan

Population (2016)
  - Total: 437
- Time zone: UTC+3:30 (IRST)

Kohneh Sar (Persian: كهنه سر) is a village in Pishkhan Rural District of the Central District in Sowme'eh Sara County, Gilan province, Iran.

== Demographics ==
=== Population ===
At the time of the 2006 National Census, the village's population was 541 in 142 households, when it was in Kasma Rural District. The following census in 2011 counted 522 people in 170 households. The 2016 census measured the population of the village as 437 people in 153 households.

In 2021, Kohneh Sar was transferred to Pishkhan Rural District created in the same district.
