= Nowdeh, Sowme'eh Sara =

Village in Gilan province, Iran

Nowdeh Persian: نوده
- Village
- Location within Iran
- Coordinates: 37°25′37″N 49°15′52″E
- Country: Iran
- Province: Gilan
- County: Sowme'eh Sara
- District: Ziabar
- Rural District: Ziabar

Population (2016)
  - Total: 323
- Time zone: UTC+3:30 (IRST)

Nowdeh (Persian: نوده) (Note: Also romanized as Now Deh) is a village in Ziabar Rural District of Ziabar District in Sowme'eh Sara County, Gilan province, Iran.

== Demographics ==
=== Population ===
At the time of the 2006 National Census, the village's population was 374 in 108 households, when it was in the Central District. The following census in 2011 counted 346 people in 113 households. The 2016 census measured the population of the village as 323 people in 112 households.

In 2021, the rural district was separated from the district in the formation of Ziabar District.
