= Ladmokh, Sowme'eh Sara =

Village in Gilan province, Iran

Ladmokh Persian: لادمخ
- Village
- Location within Iran
- Coordinates: 37°18′08″N 49°17′12″E
- Country: Iran
- Province: Gilan
- County: Sowme'eh Sara
- District: Central
- Rural District: Kasma

Population (2016)
  - Total: 596
- Time zone: UTC+3:30 (IRST)

Ladmokh (Persian: لادمخ) (Note: Also romanized as Lādmakh and Lādmokh) is a village in Kasma Rural District of the Central District in Sowme'eh Sara County, Gilan province, Iran.

== Demographics ==
=== Population ===
At the time of the 2006 National Census, the village's population was 832 in 217 households. The following census in 2011 counted 738 people in 227 households. The 2016 census measured the population of the village as 596 people in 207 households.
