= Matak, Iran =

Village in Gilan province, Iran

Matak Persian: ماتك
- Village
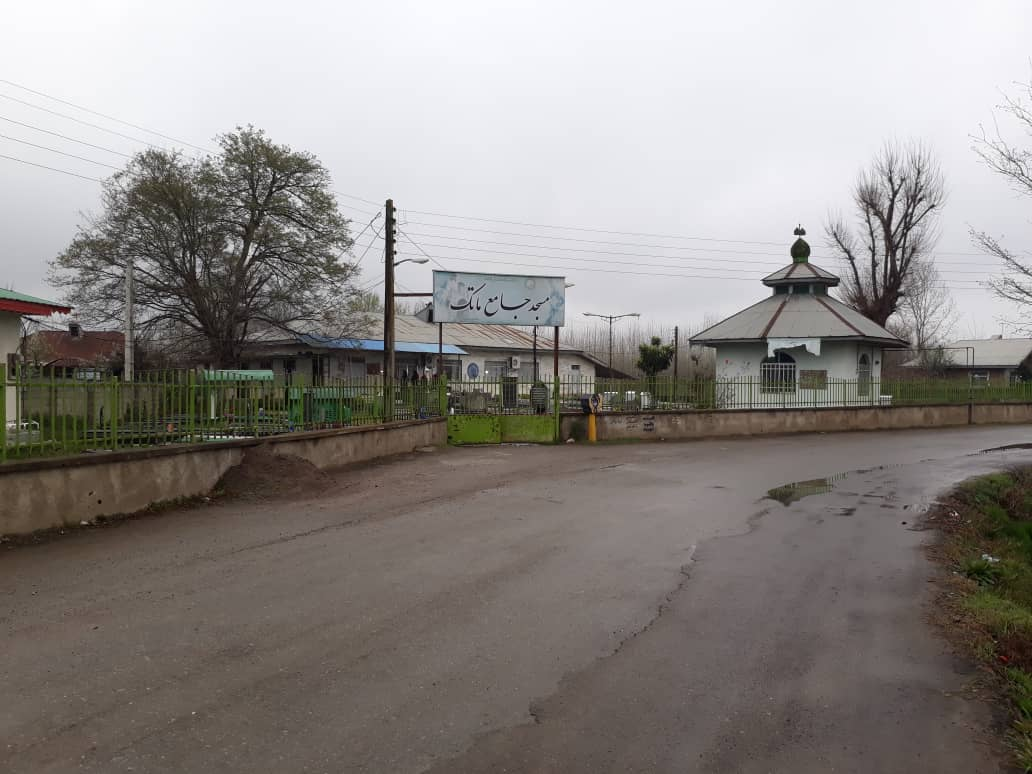
- Mosque in the village of Matak

- Location within Iran
- Coordinates: 37°18′34″N 49°24′15″E
- Country: Iran
- Province: Gilan
- County: Sowme'eh Sara
- District: Tulem
- Rural District: Tulem

Population (2016)
  - Total: 662
- Time zone: UTC+3:30 (IRST)

Matak (Persian: ماتك) (Note: Also romanized as Mātak and Matek) is a village in, and the former capital of, Tulem Rural District in Tulem District of Sowme'eh Sara County, Gilan province, Iran. The capital of the rural district has been transferred to the village of Lifshagerd.

== Demographics ==
=== Population ===
At the time of the 2006 National Census, the village's population was 888 in 242 households. The following census in 2011 counted 770 people in 243 households. The 2016 census measured the population of the village as 662 people in 226 households.
