= Khatiban, Sowme'eh Sara =

Khatiban خطيبان
- Village
- Location within Iran
- Coordinates: 37°17′43″N 49°19′23″E
- Country: Iran
- Province: Gilan
- County: Sowme'eh Sara
- Bakhsh: Central
- Rural District: Kasma

Population (2016)
  - Total: 206
- Time zone: UTC+3:30 (IRST)

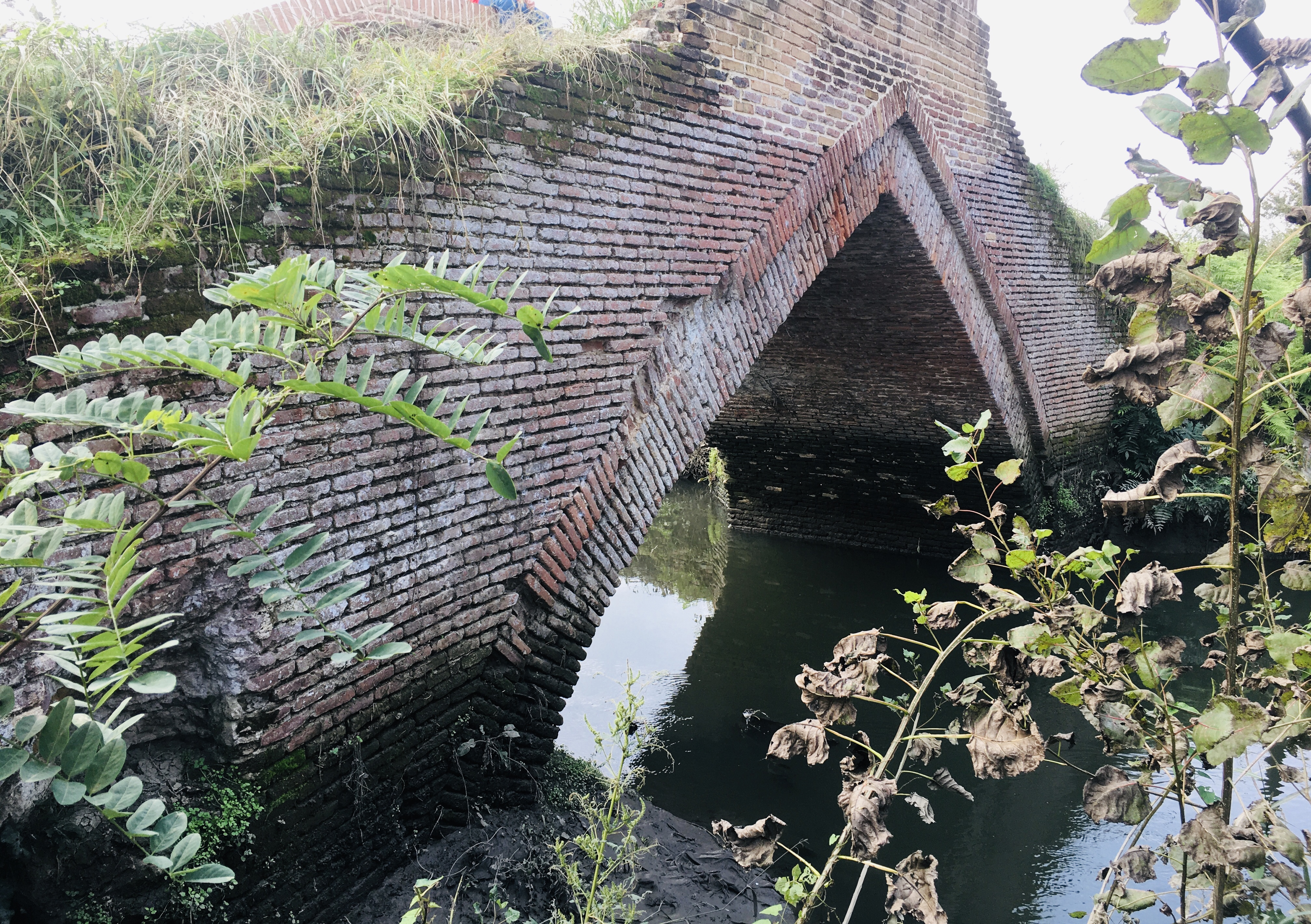
Brick bridge of Khatiban

Khatiban (Persian: خطيبان, also Romanized as Khaţībān) is a village in Kasma Rural District, in the Central District of Sowme'eh Sara County, Gilan Province, Iran. At the 2016 census, its population was 206, in 71 families. Down from 316 people in 2006.
