= Seyqalan, Sowme'eh Sara =

Seyqalan صيقلان
- Village
- Location within Iran
- Coordinates: 37°18′58″N 49°23′21″E
- Country: Iran
- Province: Gilan
- County: Sowme'eh Sara
- Bakhsh: Central
- Rural District: Kasma

Population (2016)
  - Total: 220
- Time zone: UTC+3:30 (IRST)

Seyqalan (Persian: صيقلان, also Romanized as Şeyqalān) is a village in Kasma Rural District, in the Central District of Sowme'eh Sara County, Gilan Province, Iran. At the 2016 census, its population was 220, in 68 families.
