= Hend Khaleh =

Village in Gilan province, Iran

Hend Khaleh Persian: هندخاله,هندوخاله
- Village
- Location within Iran
- Coordinates: 37°22′55″N 49°26′39″E
- Country: Iran
- Province: Gilan
- County: Sowme'eh Sara
- District: Tulem
- Rural District: Hend Khaleh

Population (2016)
  - Total: 1,683
- Time zone: UTC+3:30 (IRST)

Hend Khaleh (Persian: هندخاله) (Note: Also romanized as Hend Khāleh; also known as Hendeh Khāleh, Hendūkhāleh, Hind Khāleh, and Khind-Khale) is a village in, and the capital of, Hend Khaleh Rural District in Tulem District of Sowme'eh Sara County, Gilan province, Iran.

== Demographics ==
=== Population ===
At the time of the 2006 National Census, the village's population was 2,188 in 613 households. The following census in 2011 counted 2,021 people in 643 households. The 2016 census measured the population of the village as 1,683 people in 597 households.
