= Dalivandan =

Village in Gilan province, Iran

Dalivandan Persian: دليوندان
- Village
- Location within Iran
- Coordinates: 37°18′16″N 49°22′10″E
- Country: Iran
- Province: Gilan
- County: Sowme'eh Sara
- District: Tulem
- Rural District: Tulem

Population (2016)
  - Total: 423
- Time zone: UTC+3:30 (IRST)

Dalivandan (Persian: دليوندان) (Note: Also romanized as Dalīvandān; also known as Delimandan) is a village in Tulem Rural District of Tulem District in Sowme'eh Sara County, Gilan province, Iran.

== Demographics ==
=== Population ===
At the time of the 2006 National Census, the village's population was 645 in 205 households. The following census in 2011 counted 569 people in 203 households. The 2016 census measured the population of the village as 423 people in 155 households.
