= Shaleh Pas =

Shaleh Pas شعله پس
- Village
- Interactive map of Shaleh Pas
- Coordinates: 37°16′56.24″N 49°17′41.75″E
- Country: Iran
- Province: Gilan
- County: Sowme'eh Sara
- Bakhsh: Central
- Rural District: Kasma

Population (2016)
  - Total: 87
- Time zone: UTC+3:30 (IRST)

Shaleh Pas (Persian: شعله پس, also Romanized as Shaʿleh Pas) is a village in Kasma Rural District, in the Central District of Sowme'eh Sara County, Gilan Province, Iran. At the 2006 census, its population was 87, in 26 families. Down from 107 in 2006.
