= Bariran =

Bariran بريران
- Village
- Location within Iran
- Coordinates: 37°18′32″N 49°24′24″E
- Country: Iran
- Province: Gilan
- County: Sowme'eh Sara
- Bakhsh: Tulem
- Rural District: Tulem

Population (2016)
  - Total: 256
- Time zone: UTC+3:30 (IRST)

Bariran (Persian: بريران, also Romanized as Barīrān; also known as Barīvān) is a village in Tulem Rural District, Tulem District, Sowme'eh Sara County, Gilan Province, Iran. At the 2006 census, its population was 256, in 92 families.
