= Miandeh, Sowme'eh Sara =

Miandeh ميانده
- Village
- Location within Iran
- Coordinates: 37°22′12″N 49°17′48″E
- Country: Iran
- Province: Gilan
- County: Sowme'eh Sara
- Bakhsh: Central
- Rural District: Kasma

Population (2016)
  - Total: 291
- Time zone: UTC+3:30 (IRST)

Miandeh (Persian: ميانده, also Romanized as Mīāndeh and Meyāndeh; also known as Miandy) is a village in Kasma Rural District, in the Central District of Sowme'eh Sara County, Gilan Province, Iran. At the 2016 census, its population was 291, in 112 families. Decreased from 567 people in 2006.
