= Sasemas =

Village in Gilan province, Iran

Sasemas Persian: سسمس
- Village
- Location within Iran
- Coordinates: 37°19′05″N 49°26′49″E
- Country: Iran
- Province: Gilan
- County: Sowme'eh Sara
- District: Tulem
- Rural District: Tulem

Population (2016)
  - Total: 844
- Time zone: UTC+3:30 (IRST)

Sasemas (Persian: سسمس) (Note: Also known as Seseh Mes) is a village in Tulem Rural District of Tulem District in Sowme'eh Sara County, Gilan province, Iran.

== Demographics ==
=== Population ===
At the time of the 2006 National Census, the village's population was 1,015 in 265 households. The following census in 2011 counted 919 people in 312 households. The 2016 census measured the population of the village as 844 people in 198 households.
