= Paskeh =

Village in Gilan province, Iran

Paskeh Persian: پاسكه
- Village
- Location within Iran
- Coordinates: 37°19′46″N 49°16′47″E
- Country: Iran
- Province: Gilan
- County: Sowme'eh Sara
- District: Central
- Rural District: Kasma

Population (2016)
  - Total: 345
- Time zone: UTC+3:30 (IRST)

Paskeh (Persian: پاسكه) (Note: Also romanized as Pāskeh; also known as Bālā Pāsgeh, Dasht-e Bījār, and Pāsgeh) is a village in Kasma Rural District of the Central District in Sowme'eh Sara County, Gilan province, Iran.

== Demographics ==
=== Population ===
At the time of the 2006 National Census, the village's population was 488 in 144 households. The following census in 2011 counted 410 people in 129 households. The 2016 census measured the population of the village as 345 people in 125 households.
