= Mardekheh-ye Kuchek =

Mardekheh-ye Kuchek مردخه کوچک
- Village
- Location within Iran
- Coordinates: 37°18′23″N 49°23′18″E
- Country: Iran
- Province: Gilan
- County: Sowme'eh Sara
- Bakhsh: Tulem
- Rural District: Tulem

Population (2016)
  - Total: 350
- Time zone: UTC+3:30 (IRST)

Mardekheh-ye Kuchek (Persian: مردخه کوچک, also Romanized as Mardekheh-ye Kūchek; also known as Mardakha, Mardakheh, and Mardekheh) is a village in Tulem Rural District, Tulem District, Sowme'eh Sara County, Gilan Province, Iran. At the 2016 census, its population was 350, in 117 families. Up from 197 people in 2006.
