= Khvajeh Alivandan =

Khvajeh Alivandan خواجه عليوندان
- Village
- Location within Iran
- Coordinates: 37°19′22″N 49°22′45″E
- Country: Iran
- Province: Gilan
- County: Sowme'eh Sara
- Bakhsh: Tulem
- Rural District: Tulem

Population (2016)
  - Total: 25
- Time zone: UTC+3:30 (IRST)

Khvajeh Alivandan (Persian: خواجه عليوندان, also Romanized as Khvājeh ‘Alīvandān; also known as Khvājeh Mandān) is a village in Tulem Rural District, Tulem District, Sowme'eh Sara County, Gilan Province, Iran. At the 2016 census, its population was 25, in 9 families. Decreased from 61 people in 2006.
