= Katemjan-e Yusefali =

Village in Gilan province, Iran

Katemjan-e Yusefali Persian: كتمجان يوسفعلي
- Village
- Location within Iran
- Coordinates: 37°24′43″N 49°14′51″E
- Country: Iran
- Province: Gilan
- County: Sowme'eh Sara
- District: Ziabar
- Rural District: Ziabar

Population (2016)
  - Total: 74
- Time zone: UTC+3:30 (IRST)

Katemjan-e Yusefali (Persian: كتمجان يوسفعلي) (Note: Also romanized as Katemjān-e Yūsef‘alī and Kotamjān-e Yūsef‘alī) is a village in Ziabar Rural District of Ziabar District in Sowme'eh Sara County, Gilan province, Iran.

== Demographics ==
=== Population ===
At the time of the 2006 National Census, the village's population was 100 in 36 households, when it was in the Central District. The following census in 2011 counted 72 people in 26 households. The 2016 census measured the population of the village as 74 people in 24 households.

In 2021, the rural district was separated from the district in the formation of Ziabar District.
