= Budian =

Budian بوديان
- Village
- Location within Iran
- Coordinates: 37°19′05″N 49°27′33″E
- Country: Iran
- Province: Gilan
- County: Sowme'eh Sara
- Bakhsh: Tulem
- Rural District: Tulem

Population (2016)
  - Total: 254
- Time zone: UTC+3:30 (IRST)

Budian (Persian: بوديان, also Romanized as Būdīān) is a village in Tulem Rural District, Tulem District, Sowme'eh Sara County, Gilan Province, Iran. At the 2016 census, its population was 254, in 87 families. Up from 237 in 2006.
