= Sadat Mahalleh, Sowme'eh Sara =

Village in Gilan province, Iran

Sadat Mahalleh Persian: سادات محله
- Village
- Location within Iran
- Coordinates: 37°21′25″N 49°26′31″E
- Country: Iran
- Province: Gilan
- County: Sowme'eh Sara
- District: Tulem
- Rural District: Hend Khaleh

Population (2016)
  - Total: 452
- Time zone: UTC+3:30 (IRST)

Sadat Mahalleh (Persian: سادات محله) (Note: Also romanized as Sādāt Maḩalleh) is a village in Hend Khaleh Rural District of Tulem District in Sowme'eh Sara County, Gilan province, Iran.

== Demographics ==
=== Population ===
At the time of the 2006 National Census, the village's population was 448 in 122 households. The following census in 2011 counted 472 people in 145 households. The 2016 census measured the population of the village as 452 people in 148 households.
