= Eshpalam =

Eshpalam اشپلم
- Village
- Location within Iran
- Coordinates: 37°18′40″N 49°19′20″E
- Country: Iran
- Province: Gilan
- County: Sowme'eh Sara
- Bakhsh: Central
- Rural District: Kasma

Population (2016)
  - Total: 87
- Time zone: UTC+3:30 (IRST)

Eshpalam (Persian: اشپلم) is a village in Kasma Rural District, in the Central District of Sowme'eh Sara County, Gilan Province, Iran. It is a southern suburb of Sowme'eh Sara city.

At the 2016 census, its population was 87, in 30 families. Decreased from 203 people in 2006.
