= Seyqalvandan =

Village in Gilan province, Iran

Seyqalvandan Persian: صيقل وندان
- Village
- Location within Iran
- Coordinates: 37°20′05″N 49°22′19″E
- Country: Iran
- Province: Gilan
- County: Sowme'eh Sara
- District: Tulem
- Rural District: Tulem

Population (2016)
  - Total: 417
- Time zone: UTC+3:30 (IRST)

Seyqalvandan (Persian: صيقل وندان) (Note: Also romanized as Şeyqalvandān) is a village in Tulem Rural District of Tulem District in Sowme'eh Sara County, Gilan province, Iran.

== Demographics ==
=== Population ===
At the time of the 2006 National Census, the village's population was 615 in 168 households. The following census in 2011 counted 491 people in 157 households. The 2016 census measured the population of the village as 417 people in 149 households.
