= Zimsar =

Zimsar زيمسار
- Village
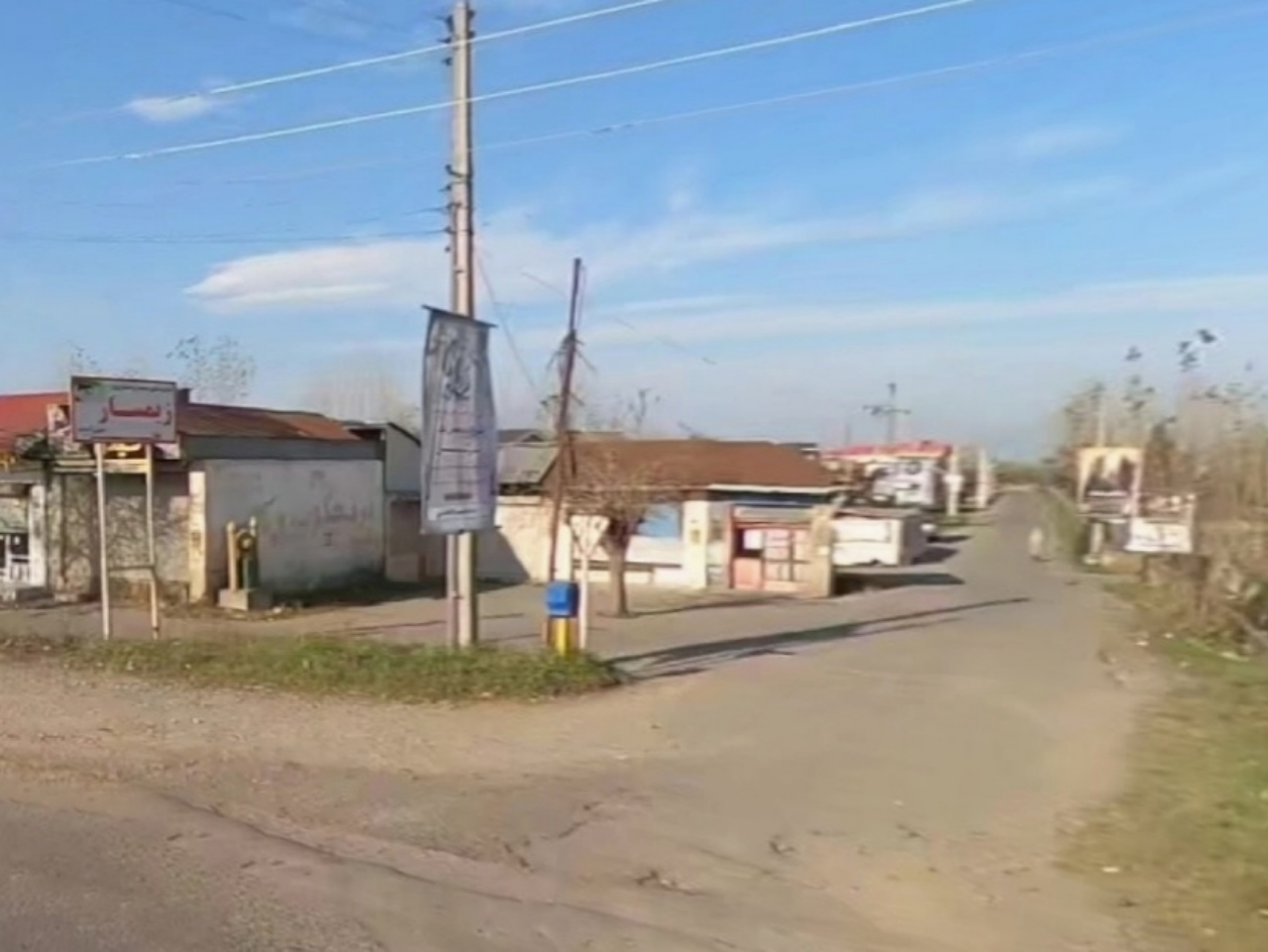

- Location within Iran
- Coordinates: 37°16′31.099″N 49°24′10.908″E
- Country: Iran
- Province: Gilan
- County: Sowme'eh Sara
- Bakhsh: Tulem
- Rural District: Tulem

Population (2016)
  - Total: 348
- Time zone: UTC+3:30 (IRST)
- Website: https://instagram.com/zimsar_village

Zimsar (Persian: زيمسار, also Romanized as Zīmsār) is a village in Tulem Rural District, Tulem District, Sowme'eh Sara County, Gilan Province, Iran. At the 2016 census, its population was 348, in 127 families. Up from 304 in 2006.
