= Kishestan =

Village in Gilan province, Iran

Kishestan Persian: كيشستان
- Village
- Location within Iran
- Coordinates: 37°20′38″N 49°29′31″E
- Country: Iran
- Province: Gilan
- County: Sowme'eh Sara
- District: Tulem
- Rural District: Hend Khaleh

Population (2016)
  - Total: 510
- Time zone: UTC+3:30 (IRST)

Kishestan (Persian: كيشستان) (Note: Also romanized as Kīshastān and Kīshestān; also known as Geshestān, Ghashistān, Keshistan, and Qīshestān) is a village in Hend Khaleh Rural District of Tulem District in Sowme'eh Sara County, Gilan province, Iran.

== Demographics ==
=== Population ===
At the time of the 2006 National Census, the village's population was 536 in 148 households. The following census in 2011 counted 604 people in 194 households. The 2016 census measured the population of the village as 510 people in 172 households.
