= Siyahtan =

Siyahtan سياه تن
- Village
- Location within Iran
- Coordinates: 37°17′53″N 49°23′09″E
- Country: Iran
- Province: Gilan
- County: Sowme'eh Sara
- Bakhsh: Tulem
- Rural District: Tulem

Population (2016)
  - Total: 331
- Time zone: UTC+3:30 (IRST)

Siyahtan (Persian: سياه تن, also Romanized as Sīyāhtan) is a village in Tulem Rural District, Tulem District, Sowme'eh Sara County, Gilan Province, Iran. At the 2016 census, its population was 331, in 110 families. Down from 493 people in 2006.
