= Gazgisheh =

Village in Gilan province, Iran

Gazgisheh Persian: گازگيشه
- Village
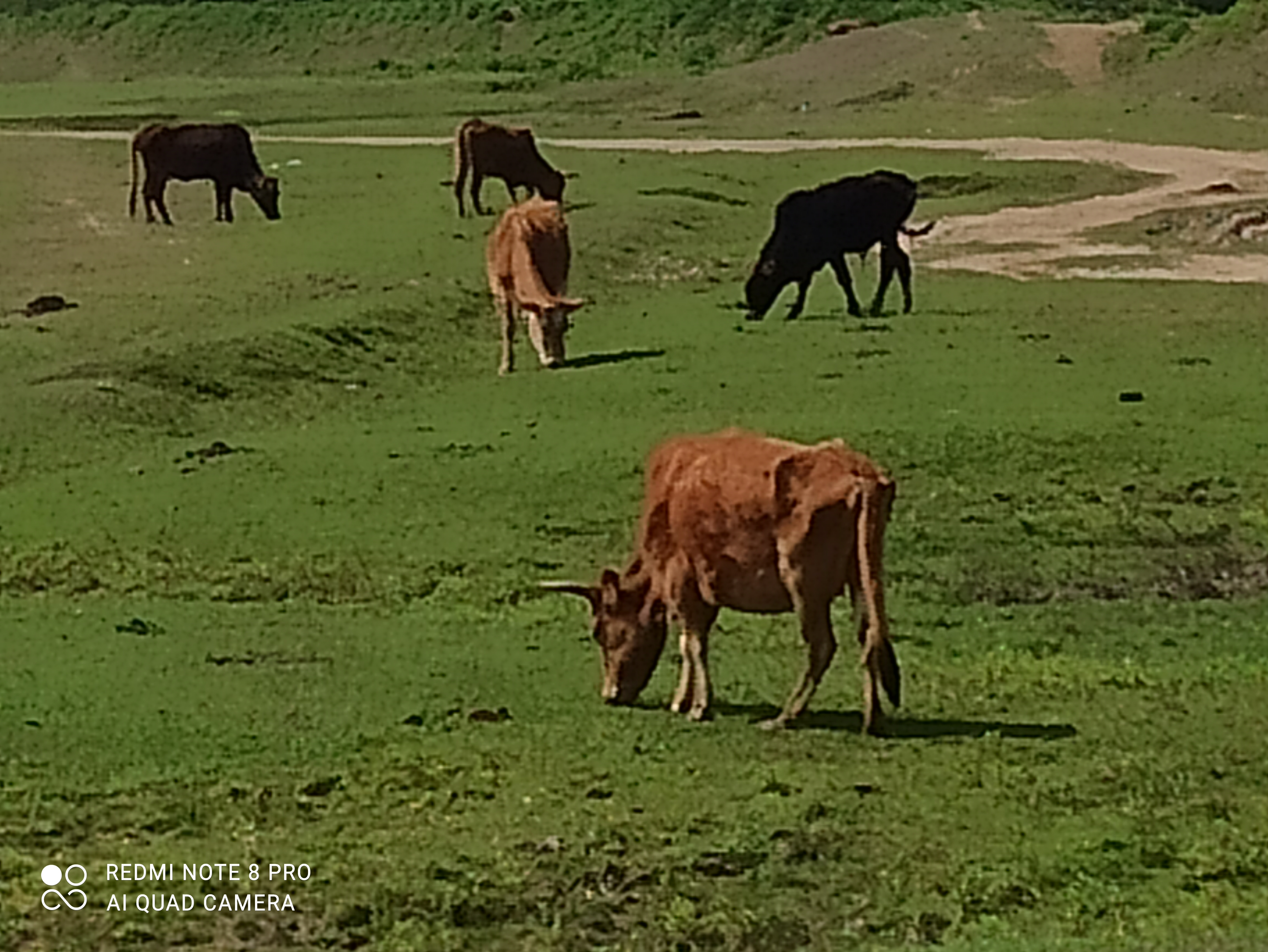

- Location within Iran
- Coordinates: 37°22′44″N 49°29′56″E
- Country: Iran
- Province: Gilan
- County: Sowme'eh Sara
- District: Tulem
- Rural District: Hend Khaleh

Population (2016)
  - Total: 289
- Time zone: UTC+3:30 (IRST)

Gazgisheh (Persian: گازگيشه) (Note: Also romanized as Gaz Gīsheh and Gazgīsheh; also known as Kāz Kīsheh) is a village in Hend Khaleh Rural District of Tulem District in Sowme'eh Sara County, Gilan province, Iran.

== Demographics ==
=== Population ===
At the time of the 2006 National Census, the village's population was 312 in 92 households. The following census in 2011 counted 328 people in 110 households. The 2016 census measured the population of the village as 289 people in 105 households.
