= Katemjan-e Seyyed Abd ol Vahhabi =

Village in Gilan province, Iran

Katemjan-e Seyyed Abd ol Vahhabi Persian: كتمجان سيدعبدالوهابي
- Village
- Location within Iran
- Coordinates: 37°24′54″N 49°15′34″E
- Country: Iran
- Province: Gilan
- County: Sowme'eh Sara
- District: Ziabar
- Rural District: Ziabar

Population (2016)
  - Total: 104
- Time zone: UTC+3:30 (IRST)

Katemjan-e Seyyed Abd ol Vahhabi (Persian: كتمجان سيدعبدالوهابي) (Note: Also romanized as Katemjan-e Seyyed ‘Abd ol Vahhābī ; also known as Kotamjān-e Seyyed ‘Abd ol Vahhāb and Kowtamjān) is a village in Ziabar Rural District of Ziabar District in Sowme'eh Sara County, Gilan province, Iran.

== Demographics ==
=== Population ===
At the time of the 2006 National Census, the village's population was 127 in 42 households, when it was in the Central District. The following census in 2011 counted 120 people in 43 households. The 2016 census measured the population of the village as 104 people in 35 households.

In 2021, the rural district was separated from the district in the formation of Ziabar District.
