= Kamsar, Iran =

Kamsar or Komsar (Persian: كمسر) in Iran may refer to:

- Kamsar, Gilan
- Komsar, Sowme'eh Sara, Gilan Province
- Kamsar, Isfahan
