= Gurab, Sowme'eh Sara =

Village in Gilan province, Iran

Gurab Persian: گوراب
- Village
- Location within Iran
- Coordinates: 37°19′45″N 49°23′35″E
- Country: Iran
- Province: Gilan
- County: Sowme'eh Sara
- District: Tulem
- Rural District: Tulem

Population (2016)
  - Total: 442
- Time zone: UTC+3:30 (IRST)

Gurab (Persian: گوراب) (Note: Also romanized as Gūrāb) is a village in Tulem Rural District of Tulem District in Sowme'eh Sara County, Gilan province, Iran.

== Demographics ==
=== Population ===
At the time of the 2006 National Census, the village's population was 535 in 136 households. The following census in 2011 counted 481 people in 155 households. The 2016 census measured the population of the village as 442 people in 141 households.
