= Qassab Sara =

Village in Gilan province, Iran

Qassab Sara Persian: قصاب سرا
- Village
- Location within Iran
- Coordinates: 37°19′19″N 49°18′26″E
- Country: Iran
- Province: Gilan
- County: Sowme'eh Sara
- District: Central
- Rural District: Kasma

Population (2016)
  - Total: 338
- Time zone: UTC+3:30 (IRST)

Qassab Sara (Persian: قصاب سرا) (Note: Also romanized as Qaşşāb Sarā) is a village in Kasma Rural District of the Central District in Sowme'eh Sara County, Gilan province, Iran.

== Demographics ==
=== Population ===
At the time of the 2006 National Census, the village's population was 405 in 120 households. The following census in 2011 counted 381 people in 117 households. The 2016 census measured the population of the village as 338 people in 117 households.
