= Pustin Sara =

Pustin Sara پوستین‌سرا
- Village
- Location within Iran
- Coordinates: 37°21′04″N 49°17′07″E
- Country: Iran
- Province: Gilan
- County: Sowme'eh Sara
- Bakhsh: Central
- Rural District: Kasma

Population (2016)
  - Total: 184
- Time zone: UTC+3:30 (IRST)

Pustin Sara (Persian: پوستین‌سرا, also Romanized as Pūstīn Sarā) is a village in Kasma Rural District, in the Central District of Sowme'eh Sara County, Gilan Province, Iran. At the 2016 census, its population was 184, in 68 families. Down from 265 people in 2006.
