= Katemjan-e Motamedi =

Village in Gilan province, Iran

Katemjan-e Motamedi Persian: کتمجان معتمدی
- Village
- Location within Iran
- Coordinates: 37°24′56″N 49°17′03″E
- Country: Iran
- Province: Gilan
- County: Sowme'eh Sara
- District: Ziabar
- Rural District: Ziabar

Population (2016)
  - Total: 35
- Time zone: UTC+3:30 (IRST)

Katemjan-e Motamedi (Persian: کتمجان معتمدی) (Note: Also romanized as Katemjān-e Mo‘tamedī; also known as Katemjān-e Mo‘tamed) is a village in Ziabar Rural District of Ziabar District in Sowme'eh Sara County, Gilan province, Iran.

== Demographics ==
=== Population ===
At the time of the 2006 National Census, the village's population was 54 in 17 households, when it was in the Central District. The following census in 2011 counted 36 people in 16 households. The 2016 census measured the population of the village as 35 people in 17 households.

In 2021, the rural district was separated from the district in the formation of Ziabar District.
