= Lakesar =

Village in Gilan province, Iran

Lakesar Persian: لاكسار
- Village
- Location within Iran
- Coordinates: 37°21′19″N 49°24′51″E
- Country: Iran
- Province: Gilan
- County: Sowme'eh Sara
- District: Tulem
- Rural District: Hend Khaleh

Population (2016)
  - Total: 372
- Time zone: UTC+3:30 (IRST)

Lakesar (Persian: لاكسار) (Note: Also romanized as Lakasar, Lākesār, Lāksār; also known as Leaksar) is a village in Hend Khaleh Rural District of Tulem District in Sowme'eh Sara County, Gilan province, Iran.

== Demographics ==
=== Population ===
At the time of the 2006 National Census, the village's population was 525 in 146 households. The following census in 2011 counted 416 people in 128 households. The 2016 census measured the population of the village as 372 people in 126 households.
