= Marsarud =

Marsarud مرسارود
- Village
- Location within Iran
- Coordinates: 37°18′37″N 49°21′39″E
- Country: Iran
- Province: Gilan
- County: Sowme'eh Sara
- Bakhsh: Tulem
- Rural District: Tulem

Population (2016)
  - Total: 51
- Time zone: UTC+3:30 (IRST)

Marsarud (Persian: مرسارود, also Romanized as Marsārūd) is a village in Tulem Rural District, Tulem District, Sowme'eh Sara County, Gilan Province, Iran. At the 2016 census, its population was 51, in 18 families. Down from 72 people in 2006.
