= Baqla Kesh =

Village in Gilan province, Iran

Baqla Kesh Persian: باقلاكش
- Village
- Location within Iran
- Coordinates: 37°22′11″N 49°30′08″E
- Country: Iran
- Province: Gilan
- County: Sowme'eh Sara
- District: Tulem
- Rural District: Hend Khaleh

Population (2016)
  - Total: 211
- Time zone: UTC+3:30 (IRST)

Baqla Kesh (Persian: باقلاكش) (Note: Also romanized as Bāqālākesh and Bāqlā Kesh) is a village in Hend Khaleh Rural District of Tulem District in Sowme'eh Sara County, Gilan province, Iran.

== Demographics ==
=== Population ===
At the time of the 2006 National Census, the village's population was 257 in 63 households. The following census in 2011 counted 251 people in 71 households. The 2016 census measured the population of the village as 211 people in 70 households.
