= Mardekheh-ye Bozorg, Iran =

Village in Gilan province, Iran

Mardekheh-ye Bozorg Persian: مردخه بزرگ
- Village
- Location within Iran
- Coordinates: 37°17′23″N 49°22′39″E
- Country: Iran
- Province: Gilan
- County: Sowme'eh Sara
- District: Tulem
- Rural District: Tulem

Population (2016)
  - Total: 419
- Time zone: UTC+3:30 (IRST)

Mardekheh-ye Bozorg (Persian: مردخه بزرگ) (Note: Also known as Mardakheh-ye Bozorg and Mardakheh) is a village in Tulem Rural District of Tulem District in Sowme'eh Sara County, Gilan province, Iran.

== Demographics ==
=== Population ===
At the time of the 2006 National Census, the village's population was 389 in 105 households. The following census in 2011 counted 489 people in 156 households. The 2016 census measured the population of the village as 419 people in 155 households.
