= Siavi =

Village in Gilan province, Iran

Siavi Persian: سياوي
- Village
- Location within Iran
- Coordinates: 37°21′29″N 49°24′28″E
- Country: Iran
- Province: Gilan
- County: Sowme'eh Sara
- District: Tulem
- Rural District: Hend Khaleh

Population (2016)
  - Total: 92
- Time zone: UTC+3:30 (IRST)

Siavi (Persian: سياوي) (Note: Also romanized as Sīāvī) is a village in Hend Khaleh Rural District of Tulem District in Sowme'eh Sara County, Gilan province, Iran.

== Demographics ==
=== Population ===
At the time of the 2006 National Census, the village's population was 138 in 36 households. The following census in 2011 counted 79 people in 26 households. The 2016 census measured the population of the village as 92 people in 29 households.

== Overview ==
It is a small region of one of the earliest ethnic Pashtuns in Iran, thought to have originated from southern Afghanistan hundreds of years ago but have been able to keep their linguistic and cultural identity intact. Also, there is a village in Khyber Pakhtunkhwa province of Pakistan, in Nizampur region of Nowshera District by the same name, where many of the members of the Siavi clan from Iran have permanently settled dating back multiple generations.

The Siavi clan is probably the oldest native Pashto-speaking clan of Iran. Although the history of their arrival in Iran is not very clear, they most likely migrated from southern regions of what is now Afghanistan.

Currently mainly in Khyber Pakhtunkhwa province in Pakistan, many of the clan members have settled in the Nizampur area of Nowshera District. Their population is estimated to be around 1,000. As was the case with their settled era over many centuries in Iran, over many centuries of settlement in mainly Khattak-dominated areas, they have maintained their separate identity although often, culturally and linguistically, they identify with the Khattak tribe of Pashtuns, likely due to intermarriage and sociocultural similarities.
