= Fallahabad, Gilan =

Village in Gilan province, Iran

Fallahabad Persian: فلاح‌آباد
- Village
- Location within Iran
- Coordinates: 37°15′22″N 49°21′23″E
- Country: Iran
- Province: Gilan
- County: Sowme'eh Sara
- District: Tulem
- Rural District: Tulem

Population (2016)
  - Total: 413
- Time zone: UTC+3:30 (IRST)

Fallahabad (Persian: فلاح‌آباد) (Note: Also romanized as Fallāḩābād) is a village in Tulem Rural District of Tulem District in Sowme'eh Sara County, Gilan province, Iran.

== Demographics ==
=== Population ===
At the time of the 2006 National Census, the village's population was 413 in 112 households. The following census in 2011 counted 477 people in 137 households. The 2016 census measured the population of the village as 413 people in 141 households.
