= Jirgurab =

Jirgurab جيرگوراب
- Village
- Location within Iran
- Coordinates: 37°21′03″N 49°17′54″E
- Country: Iran
- Province: Gilan
- County: Sowme'eh Sara
- Bakhsh: Central
- Rural District: Kasma

Population (2016)
  - Total: 22
- Time zone: UTC+3:30 (IRST)

Jirgurab (Persian: جيرگوراب, also Romanized as Jīrgūrāb; also known as Dzhirgiran and Jirgiran) is a village in Kasma Rural District, in the Central District of Sowme'eh Sara County, Gilan Province, Iran. At the 2016 census, its population was 22, in 11 families. Decreased from 102 people in 2006.
