= Araban, Gilan =

Araban عربان
- Village
- Location within Iran
- Coordinates: 37°19′09″N 49°20′12″E
- Country: Iran
- Province: Gilan
- County: Sowme'eh Sara
- Bakhsh: Central
- Rural District: Kasma

Population (2016)
  - Total: 75
- Time zone: UTC+3:30 (IRST)

Araban (Persian: عربان, also Romanized as ‘Arabān) is a village in Kasma Rural District, in the Central District of Sowme'eh Sara County, Gilan Province, Iran. At the 2016 census, its population was 75, in 26 families. Down from 114 people in 2006.
