= Kalashem-e Pain =

Village in Gilan province, Iran

Kalashem-e Pain Persian: كلاشم پائين
- Village
- Location within Iran
- Coordinates: 37°16′35″N 49°23′17″E
- Country: Iran
- Province: Gilan
- County: Sowme'eh Sara
- District: Tulem
- Rural District: Tulem

Population (2016)
  - Total: 836
- Time zone: UTC+3:30 (IRST)

Kalashem-e Pain (Persian: كلاشم پائين) (Note: Also romanized as Kalāshem-e Pā’īn; also known as Kal Hāshem) is a village in Tulem Rural District of Tulem District in Sowme'eh Sara County, Gilan province, Iran.

== Demographics ==
=== Population ===
At the time of the 2006 National Census, the village's population was 807 in 215 households. The following census in 2011 counted 828 people in 256 households. The 2016 census measured the population of the village as 836 people in 284 households.
