= Chubeh =

Chubeh or Chubah or Chubakh (Persian: چوبه) may refer to:

- Chubeh, Gilan
- Chubeh, Qazvin
