= Now Khaleh =

Now Khaleh or Nowkhaleh or Nau Khaleh (Persian: نوخاله) may refer to:

- Now Khaleh-ye Akbari
- Now Khaleh-ye Jafari
