= Khakian =

Village in Gilan province, Iran

Khakian Persian: خاكيان
- Village
- Location within Iran
- Coordinates: 37°17′16″N 49°18′21″E
- Country: Iran
- Province: Gilan
- County: Sowme'eh Sara
- District: Central
- Rural District: Kasma

Population (2016)
  - Total: 328
- Time zone: UTC+3:30 (IRST)

Khakian (Persian: خاكيان) (Note: Also romanized as Khākīān) is a village in Kasma Rural District of the Central District in Sowme'eh Sara County, Gilan province, Iran.

== Demographics ==
=== Population ===
At the time of the 2006 National Census, the village's population was 347 in 84 households. The following census in 2011 counted 379 people in 111 households. The 2016 census measured the population of the village as 328 people in 106 households.
