= Nofut =

Village in Gilan province, Iran

Nofut Persian: نفوت
- Village
- Location within Iran
- Coordinates: 37°16′17″N 49°17′21″E
- Country: Iran
- Province: Gilan
- County: Sowme'eh Sara
- District: Central
- Rural District: Kasma

Population (2016)
  - Total: 756
- Time zone: UTC+3:30 (IRST)

Nofut (Persian: نفوت) (Note: Also romanized as Nafūt and Nofūt; also known as Neqūt and Nufut) is a village in Kasma Rural District of the Central District in Sowme'eh Sara County, Gilan province, Iran.

== Demographics ==
=== Population ===
At the time of the 2006 National Census, the village's population was 879 in 248 households. The following census in 2011 counted 893 people in 274 households. The 2016 census measured the population of the village as 756 people in 258 households.
