= Vaqeeh Dasht =

Village in Gilan province, Iran

Vaqeeh Dasht Persian: واقعه دشت
- Village
- Location within Iran
- Coordinates: 37°16′55″N 49°18′14″E
- Country: Iran
- Province: Gilan
- County: Sowme'eh Sara
- District: Central
- Rural District: Kasma

Population (2016)
  - Total: 412
- Time zone: UTC+3:30 (IRST)

Vaqeeh Dasht (Persian: واقعه دشت) (Note: Also romanized as Vāqe‘eh Dasht; also known as Vāqafeh Dasht) is a village in Kasma Rural District of the Central District in Sowme'eh Sara County, Gilan province, Iran.

== Demographics ==
=== Population ===
At the time of the 2006 National Census, the village's population was 496 in 133 households. The following census in 2011 counted 530 people in 167 households. The 2016 census measured the population of the village as 412 people in 140 households.
