= Tulem =

Tulem (Persian: تولم) may refer to:

- Tulem District
- Tulem Rural District
