= Bahambar Rural District =

Rural district in Gilan province, Iran

Bahambar Rural District Persian: دهستان بهمبر
- Rural District
- Location within Iran
- Coordinates: 37°27′N 49°14′E
- Country: Iran
- Province: Gilan
- County: Sowme'eh Sara
- District: Ziabar
- Established: 2021
- Capital: Bishehgah
- Time zone: UTC+3:30 (IRST)

Bahambar Rural District (Persian: دهستان بهمبر) is in Ziabar District of Sowme'eh Sara County, Gilan province, Iran. Its capital is the village of Bishehgah, whose population at the time of the 2016 National Census was 270 in 90 households.

== History ==
After the census, Ziabar Rural District was separated from the Central District in the formation of Ziabar District, and Bahambar Rural District was created in the new district.

== Other villages in the rural district ==
- Aqa Mahalleh-ye Bahambar
- Bahambar
- Bijarkan
- Bishehgah-e Bahambar
- Eram Sadat
- Esfaqansar
- Jirsar-e Bahambar
- Khalifeh Kenar
- Khoshk-e Rudbar
- Lalom
- Larsar
- Maaf Vaziri
- Mazandaran Mahalleh-ye Bahambar
- Mian Gaskar
- Qaraba
- Saremeh
- Shaft Mahalleh
- Talesh Mahalleh-ye Bahambar
