= Nargestan =

Village in Gilan province, Iran

Nargestan Persian: نرگستان
- Village
- Location within Iran
- Coordinates: 37°22′00″N 49°22′47″E
- Country: Iran
- Province: Gilan
- County: Sowme'eh Sara
- District: Tulem
- Rural District: Hend Khaleh

Population (2016)
  - Total: 795
- Time zone: UTC+3:30 (IRST)

Nargestan (Persian: نرگستان) (Note: Also romanized as Nargestān; also known as Nadgiran and Nargistān) is a village in Hend Khaleh Rural District of Tulem District in Sowme'eh Sara County, Gilan province, Iran.

== Demographics ==
=== Population ===
At the time of the 2006 National Census, the village's population was 1,027 in 310 households. The following census in 2011 counted 956 people in 330 households. The 2016 census measured the population of the village as 795 people in 275 households.
