= Golabkharan =

Golabkhvaran گلابخواران
- Village
- Location within Iran
- Coordinates: 37°19′19″N 49°23′09″E
- Country: Iran
- Province: Gilan
- County: Sowme'eh Sara
- Bakhsh: Tulem
- Rural District: Tulem

Population (2016)
  - Total: 101
- Time zone: UTC+3:30 (IRST)

Golabkhvaran (Persian: گلابخواران, also Romanized as Golābkhvārān; also known as Golābkhvorān) is a village in Tulem Rural District, Tulem District, Sowme'eh Sara County, Gilan Province, Iran. At the 2006 census, its population was 112, in 29 families. In 2016, it had 101 people in 34 households.
