= Sheykh Mahalleh, Sowme'eh Sara =

Village in Gilan province, Iran

Sheykh Mahalleh Persian: شيخ محله
- Village
- Location within Iran
- Coordinates: 37°21′05″N 49°25′46″E
- Country: Iran
- Province: Gilan
- County: Sowme'eh Sara
- District: Tulem
- Rural District: Hend Khaleh

Population (2016)
  - Total: 934
- Time zone: UTC+3:30 (IRST)

Sheykh Mahalleh (Persian: شيخ محله) (Note: Also romanized as Sheykh Maḩalleh) is a village in Hend Khaleh Rural District of Tulem District in Sowme'eh Sara County, Gilan province, Iran.

== Demographics ==
=== Population ===
At the time of the 2006 National Census, the village's population was 1,008 in 279 households. The following census in 2011 counted 1,053 people in 330 households. The 2016 census measured the population of the village as 934 people in 326 households.
