= Zafan =

Zafan زعفان
- Village
- Location within Iran
- Coordinates: 37°20′29″N 49°17′40″E
- Country: Iran
- Province: Gilan
- County: Sowme'eh Sara
- Bakhsh: Central
- Rural District: Kasma

Population (2016)
  - Total: 44
- Time zone: UTC+3:30 (IRST)

Zafan (Persian: زعفان, also Romanized as Za‘fān, Zāfān, and Zeefan) is a village in Kasma Rural District, in the Central District of Sowme'eh Sara County, Gilan Province, Iran. At the 2016 census, its population was 44 people in 15 households.
