= Dowgur =

Village in Gilan province, Iran

Dowgur Persian: دوگور
- Village
- Location within Iran
- Coordinates: 37°17′06″N 49°20′54″E
- Country: Iran
- Province: Gilan
- County: Sowme'eh Sara
- District: Central
- Rural District: Kasma

Population (2016)
  - Total: 995
- Time zone: UTC+3:30 (IRST)

Dowgur (Persian: دوگور) (Note: Also romanized as Dowgūr and Dugur; also known as Dogūr) is a village in Kasma Rural District of the Central District in Sowme'eh Sara County, Gilan province, Iran.

== Demographics ==
=== Population ===
At the time of the 2006 National Census, the village's population was 1,038 in 291 households. The following census in 2011 counted 1,116 people in 321 households. The 2016 census measured the population of the village as 995 people in 302 households.
