= Kharrat Mahalleh, Sowme'eh Sara =

Kharrat Mahalleh خراطمحله
- Village
- Location within Iran
- Coordinates: 37°19′36″N 49°22′14″E
- Country: Iran
- Province: Gilan
- County: Sowme'eh Sara
- Bakhsh: Tulem
- Rural District: Tulem

Population (2016)
  - Total: 350
- Time zone: UTC+3:30 (IRST)

Kharrat Mahalleh (Persian: خراطمحله, also Romanized as Kharrāţ Maḩalleh; also known as Khord Maḩalleh) is a village in Tulem Rural District, Tulem District, Sowme'eh Sara County, Gilan Province, Iran. At the 2016 census, its population was 350, in 110 families. Down from 483 people in 2006.
