= Seyqalan, Tulem =

Seyqalan صيقلان
- Village
- Location within Iran
- Coordinates: 37°18′52″N 49°23′03″E
- Country: Iran
- Province: Gilan
- County: Sowme'eh Sara
- Bakhsh: Tulem
- Rural District: Tulem

Population (2016)
  - Total: 235
- Time zone: UTC+3:30 (IRST)

Seyqalan (Persian: صيقلان, also Romanized as Şeyqalān; also known as Segelyan) is a village in Tulem Rural District, Tulem District, Sowme'eh Sara County, Gilan Province, Iran. At the 2006 census, its population was 235, in 89 families. Down from 322 people in 2006.
