= Chubeh, Gilan =

Village in Gilan province, Iran

Chubeh Persian: چوبه
- Village
- Location within Iran
- Coordinates: 37°19′04″N 49°21′31″E
- Country: Iran
- Province: Gilan
- County: Sowme'eh Sara
- District: Central
- Rural District: Pishkhan

Population (2016)
  - Total: 650
- Time zone: UTC+3:30 (IRST)

Chubeh (Persian: چوبه) (Note: Also romanized as Chūbeh; also known as Chuba) is a village in Pishkhan Rural District of the Central District in Sowme'eh Sara County, Gilan province, Iran.

== Demographics ==
=== Population ===
At the time of the 2006 National Census, the village's population was 787 in 230 households, when it was in Kasma Rural District. The following census in 2011 counted 756 people in 243 households. The 2016 census measured the population of the village as 650 people in 226 households.

In 2021, Chubeh was transferred to Pishkhan Rural District created in the same district.
