= Fashkham =

Village in Gilan province, Iran

Fashkham Persian: فشخام
- Village
- Location within Iran
- Coordinates: 37°17′08″N 49°19′53″E
- Country: Iran
- Province: Gilan
- County: Sowme'eh Sara
- District: Central
- Rural District: Kasma

Population (2016)
  - Total: 303
- Time zone: UTC+3:30 (IRST)

Fashkham (Persian: فشخام) (Note: Also romanized as Fashkhām and Feshkham; also known as Fankhām) is a village in Kasma Rural District of the Central District in Sowme'eh Sara County, Gilan province, Iran.

== Demographics ==
=== Population ===
At the time of the 2006 National Census, the village's population was 421 in 122 households. The following census in 2011 counted 457 people in 150 households. The 2016 census measured the population of the village as 303 people in 106 households.
