= Siah Darvishan =

Village in Gilan province, Iran

Siah Darvishan Persian: سياه درويشان
- Village
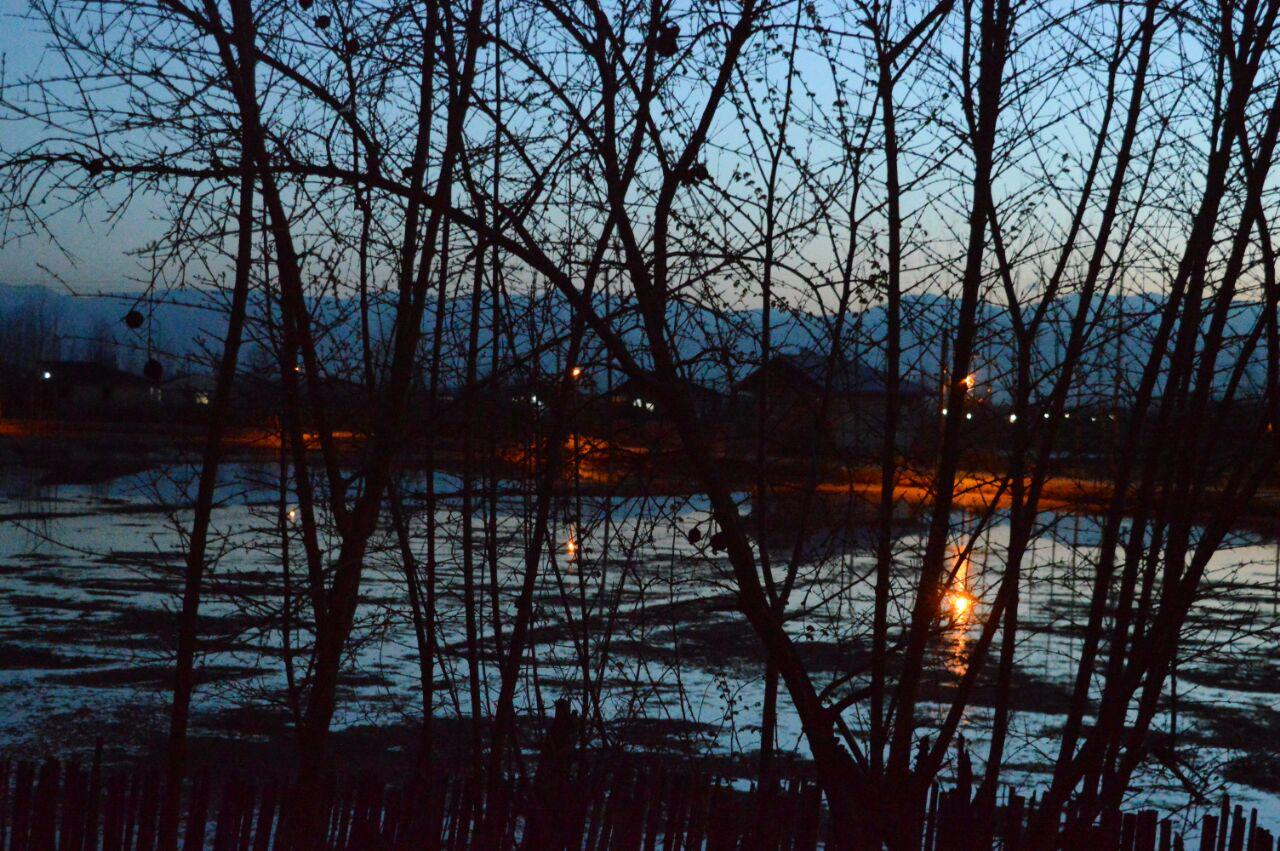
- Siah Darvishan in twilight

- Location within Iran
- Coordinates: 37°22′19″N 49°25′32″E
- Country: Iran
- Province: Gilan
- County: Sowme'eh Sara
- District: Tulem
- Rural District: Hend Khaleh

Population (2016)
  - Total: 766
- Time zone: UTC+3:30 (IRST)

Siah Darvishan (Persian: سياه درويشان) (Note: Also romanized as Sīāh Darvīshān; also known as Siyakh-Darveshan) is a village in Hend Khaleh Rural District of Tulem District in Sowme'eh Sara County, Gilan province, Iran.

== Demographics ==
=== Population ===
At the time of the 2006 National Census, the village's population was 956 in 276 households. The following census in 2011 counted 796 people in 259 households. The 2016 census measured the population of the village as 766 people in 257 households.
