= Kama, Iran =

Kama كما
- Village
- Location within Iran
- Coordinates: 37°16′50″N 49°17′10″E
- Country: Iran
- Province: Gilan
- County: Sowme'eh Sara
- Bakhsh: Central
- Rural District: Kasma

Population (2016)
  - Total: 242
- Time zone: UTC+3:30 (IRST)

Kama (Persian: كما, also Romanized as Kamā and Komā’; also known as Kumma) is a village in Kasma Rural District, in the Central District of Sowme'eh Sara County, Gilan Province, Iran. At the 2016 census, its population was 242, in 87 families. Down from 313 people in 2006.
