= Kolkuh =

Kolkuh كلكوه
- Village
- Location within Iran
- Coordinates: 37°19′21″N 49°20′33″E
- Country: Iran
- Province: Gilan
- County: Sowme'eh Sara
- Bakhsh: Tulem
- Rural District: Tulem

Population (2016)
  - Total: 78
- Time zone: UTC+3:30 (IRST)

Kolkuh (Persian: كلكوه, also Romanized as Kolkūh) is a village in Tulem Rural District, Tulem District, Sowme'eh Sara County, Gilan Province, Iran. At the 2006 census, its population was 78, in 28 families. Down from 118 people in 2006.
