= Lifshagerd =

Village in Gilan province, Iran

Lifshagerd Persian: ليفشاگرد
- Village
- Location within Iran
- Coordinates: 37°19′20″N 49°24′58″E
- Country: Iran
- Province: Gilan
- County: Sowme'eh Sara
- District: Tulem
- Rural District: Tulem

Population (2016)
  - Total: 1,021
- Time zone: UTC+3:30 (IRST)

Lifshagerd (Persian: ليفشاگرد) (Note: Also romanized as Līfshāgerd) is a village in, and the capital of, Tulem Rural District of Tulem District, Sowme'eh Sara County, Gilan province, Iran. The previous capital of the rural district was the village of Matak.

== Demographics ==
=== Population ===
At the time of the 2006 National Census, the village's population was 1,352 in 385 households. The following census in 2011 counted 835 people in 268 households. The 2016 census measured the population of the village as 1,021 people in 357 households. It was the most populous village in its rural district.
