= Kasma =

Village in Gilan province, Iran

Kasma Persian: كسما
- Village
- Location within Iran
- Coordinates: 37°19′42″N 49°18′04″E
- Country: Iran
- Province: Gilan
- County: Sowme'eh Sara
- District: Central
- Rural District: Kasma

Population (2016)
  - Total: 1,508
- Time zone: UTC+3:30 (IRST)

Kasma (Persian: كسما) (Note: Also romanized as Kasmā and Kasmā’) is a village in, and the capital of, Kasma Rural District in the Central District of Sowme'eh Sara County, Gilan province, Iran.

== Demographics ==
=== Population ===
At the time of the 2006 National Census, the village's population was 1,785 in 499 households. The following census in 2011 counted 1,674 people in 506 households. The 2016 census measured the population of the village as 1,508 people in 512 households. It was the most populous village in its rural district.
