= Rasteh Kenar, Sowme'eh Sara =

Rasteh Kenar راسته كنار
- Village
- Location within Iran
- Coordinates: 37°21′22″N 49°19′11″E
- Country: Iran
- Province: Gilan
- County: Sowme'eh Sara
- Bakhsh: Central
- Rural District: Kasma

Population (2016)
  - Total: 175
- Time zone: UTC+3:30 (IRST)

Rasteh Kenar (Persian: راسته كنار, also Romanized as Rāsteh Kenār; also known as Rastokutar) is a village in Kasma Rural District, in the Central District of Sowme'eh Sara County, Gilan Province, Iran. At the 2016 census, its population was 175, in 75 families. Decreased from 423 people in 2006.
