= Jir Mahalleh-ye Kasma =

Village in Gilan province, Iran

Jir Mahalleh-ye Kasma Persian: جيرمحله كسما
- Village
- Location within Iran
- Coordinates: 37°20′50″N 49°18′48″E
- Country: Iran
- Province: Gilan
- County: Sowme'eh Sara
- District: Central
- Rural District: Kasma

Population (2016)
  - Total: 310
- Time zone: UTC+3:30 (IRST)

Jir Mahalleh-ye Kasma (Persian: جيرمحله كسما) (Note: Also romanized as Jīr Maḩalleh-ye Kasmā and Jīr Maḩalleh-ye Kasmā’; also known as Jīr Maḩalleh) is a village in Kasma Rural District of the Central District in Sowme'eh Sara County, Gilan province, Iran.

== Demographics ==
=== Population ===
At the time of the 2006 National Census, the village's population was 435 in 128 households. The following census in 2011 counted 425 people in 137 households. The 2016 census measured the population of the village as 310 people in 116 households.
