= Sufian Deh =

Village in Gilan province, Iran

Sufian Deh Persian: صوفيان ده
- Village
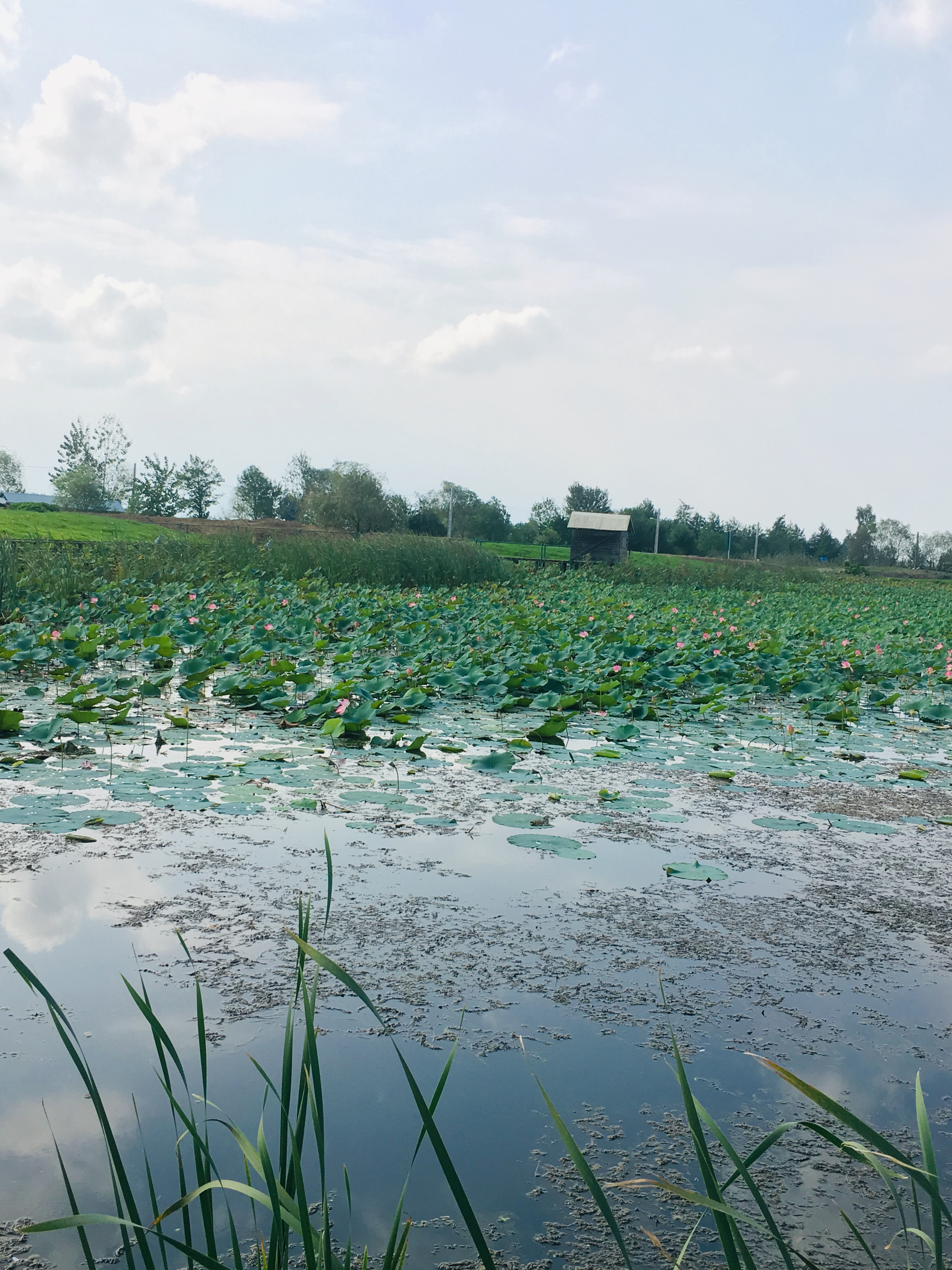
- Salakeh Protected Area in Sufian Deh

- Location within Iran
- Coordinates: 37°22′10″N 49°28′07″E
- Country: Iran
- Province: Gilan
- County: Sowme'eh Sara
- District: Tulem
- Rural District: Hend Khaleh

Population (2016)
  - Total: 684
- Time zone: UTC+3:30 (IRST)

Sufian Deh (Persian: صوفيان ده) (Note: Also romanized as Şūfīān Deh) is a village in Hend Khaleh Rural District of Tulem District in Sowme'eh Sara County, Gilan province, Iran.

== Demographics ==
=== Population ===
At the time of the 2006 National Census, the village's population was 809 in 231 households. The following census in 2011 counted 827 people in 250 households. The 2016 census measured the population of the village as 684 people in 232 households.
