= Dahandeh =

Dahandeh دهنده
- Village
- Location within Iran
- Coordinates: 37°20′53″N 49°17′40″E
- Country: Iran
- Province: Gilan
- County: Sowme'eh Sara
- Bakhsh: Central
- Rural District: Kasma

Population (2016)
  - Total: 119
- Time zone: UTC+3:30 (IRST)

Dahandeh (Persian: دهنده; also known as Dowhāndeh and Dowhondeh) is a village in Kasma Rural District, in the Central District of Sowme'eh Sara County, Gilan Province, Iran. At the 2016 census, its population was 119, in 52 families. Decreased from 323 people in 2006.
