= Khomsar =

Village in Gilan province, Iran

Khomsar Persian: خمسر
- Village
- Location within Iran
- Coordinates: 37°22′21″N 49°24′17″E
- Country: Iran
- Province: Gilan
- County: Sowme'eh Sara
- District: Tulem
- Rural District: Hend Khaleh

Population (2016)
  - Total: 119
- Time zone: UTC+3:30 (IRST)

Khomsar (Persian: خمسر) (Note: Also known as Komsar) is a village in Hend Khaleh Rural District of Tulem District in Sowme'eh Sara County, Gilan province, Iran.

== Demographics ==
=== Population ===
At the time of the 2006 National Census, the village's population was 160 in 57 households. The following census in 2011 counted 137 people in 46 households. The 2016 census measured the population of the village as 119 people in 43 households.
