= Shalka, Iran =

Shalka شالكا
- Village
- Interactive map of Shalka
- Coordinates: 37°17′41.73″N 49°26′28.44″E
- Country: Iran
- Province: Gilan
- County: Sowme'eh Sara
- Bakhsh: Tulem
- Rural District: Tulem

Population (2011)
  - Total: 17
- Time zone: UTC+3:30 (IRST)

Shalka (Persian: شالكا, also Romanized as Shālkā) is a village in Tulem Rural District, Tulem District, Sowme'eh Sara County, Gilan Province, Iran. At the 2006 census, its population was 30, in 5 families. Down to 17 people and 4 households in 2011. In 2016, it had less than 4 households and its population was not reported.
