= Now Khaleh-ye Akbari =

Village in Gilan province, Iran

Now Khaleh-ye Akbari Persian: نوخاله اكبري
- Village
- Location within Iran
- Coordinates: 37°21′06″N 49°28′01″E
- Country: Iran
- Province: Gilan
- County: Sowme'eh Sara
- District: Tulem
- Rural District: Hend Khaleh

Population (2016)
  - Total: 2,135
- Time zone: UTC+3:30 (IRST)

Now Khaleh-ye Akbari (Persian: نوخاله اكبري) (Note: Also romanized as Now Khāleh-ye Akbarī; also known as Nau Khāleh, Naugali, Nokhale, Now Khāleh, Now Khāleh Akbar, Now Khāleh-ye Akbar, and Nukhalekh) is a village in Hend Khaleh Rural District of Tulem District in Sowme'eh Sara County, Gilan province, Iran.

== Demographics ==
=== Population ===
At the time of the 2006 National Census, the village's population was 2,393 in 625 households. The following census in 2011 counted 2,351 people in 708 households. The 2016 census measured the population of the village as 2,135 people in 684 households. It was the most populous village in its rural district.
