= Kamsar (disambiguation) =

Kamsar is a city in Guinea.

Kamsar may also refer to:

- Dildarnagar Kamsar, a region in Uttar Pradesh, India
- Kamsar, Gilan, a village in Gilan Province, Iran
- Qamsar, a village in Isfahan province, Iran
- Kamsar (Kamo Sahakyan) (born 1961), Algerian painter
