= Kuhrud =

Kuhrud (Persian: كوهرود) may refer to:

- Kuhrud, Gilan
- Kuhrud, Isfahan
