= Shalka =

Shalka may refer to:

- Scream of the Shalka
- Shalka, Iran
- Shalka, Fuman, Iran
- Shalka (meteorite)
