= Ziabar =

City in Gilan province, Iran

Ziabar Persian: ضيابر
- Village
- Location within Iran
- Coordinates: 37°25′35″N 49°14′40″E
- Country: Iran
- Province: Gilan
- County: Sowme'eh Sara
- District: Ziabar
- Established as a city: 2023

Population (2016)
  - Total: 3,603
- Demonym: Ziabari
- Time zone: UTC+3:30 (IRST)

Ziabar (Persian: ضيابر) (Note: Also romanized as Zeyābar, Ẕīā’ Bar, Ẕīābar, and Zīyā’ Bar; also known as Ziabera; formerly known as Gaskar) is a city in, and the capital of, Ziabar District in Sowme'eh Sara County, Gilan province, Iran. As a village it was the capital of Ziabar Rural District until its capital was transferred to the village of Chakuvar. The history of Ziabar dates back to 14th century.

== Demographics ==
The people of Ziabar mostly speak the Gilaki language. Their main occupations are in farming (mainly rice) and in the wood industry.

=== Population ===
At the time of the 2006 National Census, Ziabar's population was 3,388 in 970 households, when it was a village in Ziabar Rural District of the Central District. The following census in 2011 counted 3,490 people in 1,099 households. The 2016 census measured the population of the village as 3,603 people in 1,193 households. It was the most populous village in its rural district.

In 2021, the rural district was separated from the district in the formation of Ziabar District. The village of Ziabar was converted to a city in 2023 and its first mayor was introduced in November of the same year.

== Culture ==
At the time of the Persian New Year, the women of Ziabar bake sweets known as halva-ye Ziabar, made with rice flour, wheat flour, fenugreek, cardamom, cumin, violets, walnuts, ginger, nettle, nutmeg, and local oil.

The traditional bazaar of Ziabar is held on Mondays every week.
