= Hend Khaleh Rural District =

Rural district in Gilan province, Iran

Hend Khaleh Rural District Persian: دهستان هندخاله
- Rural District
- Location within Iran
- Coordinates: 37°22′N 49°26′E
- Country: Iran
- Province: Gilan
- County: Sowme'eh Sara
- District: Tulem
- Established: 1987
- Capital: Hend Khaleh

Population (2016)
  - Total: 11,013
- Time zone: UTC+3:30 (IRST)

Hend Khaleh Rural District (Persian: دهستان هندخاله) is in Tulem District of Sowme'eh Sara County, Gilan province, Iran. Its capital is the village of Hend Khaleh.

== Demographics ==
=== Population ===
At the time of the 2006 National Census, the rural district's population was 13,109 in 3,655 households. There were 12,572 inhabitants in 3,975 households at the following census of 2011. The 2016 census measured the population of the rural district as 11,013 in 3,736 households. The most populous of its 14 villages was Now Khaleh-ye Akbari, with 2,135 people.

=== Other villages in the rural district ===
- Baqla Kesh
- Gazgisheh
- Khomsar
- Kishestan
- Lakesar
- Nargestan
- Now Khaleh-ye Jafari
- Sadat Mahalleh
- Sheykh Mahalleh
- Siah Darvishan
- Siavi
- Sufian Deh
