= Marjaghal =

City in Gilan province, Iran

Marjaghal Persian: مرجغل
- City
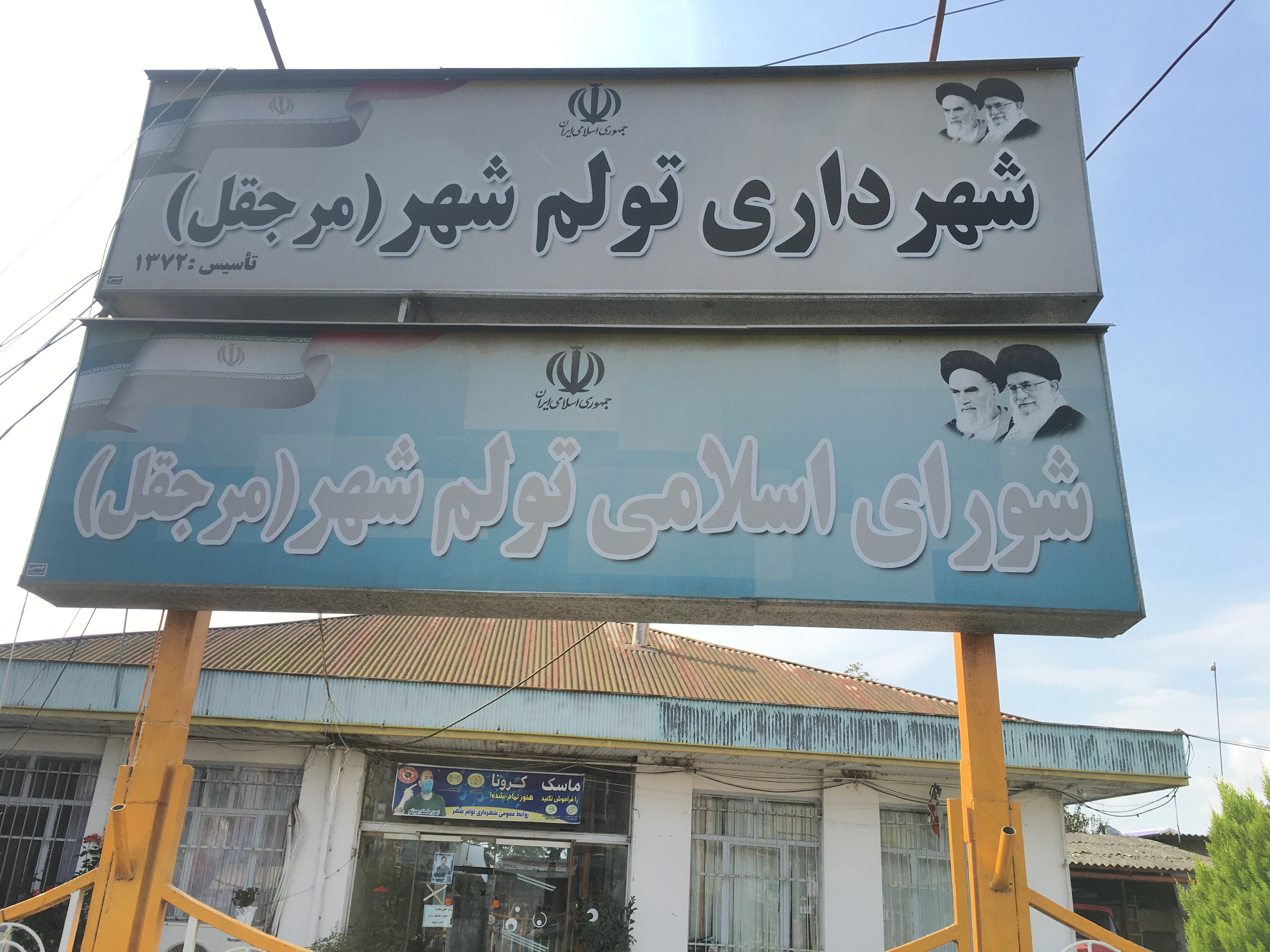

- Location within Iran
- Coordinates: 37°16′30″N 49°22′34″E
- Country: Iran
- Province: Gilan
- County: Sowme'eh Sara
- District: Tulem

Population (2016)
  - Total: 6,735
- Time zone: UTC+3:30 (IRST)

Marjaghal (Persian: مرجغل) (Note: Also romanized as Mardzhagal and Marjaqal; also known as Tulem Shahr) is a city in, and the capital of, Tulem District of Sowme'eh Sara County, Gilan province, Iran.

== Demographics ==
=== Population ===
At the time of the 2006 National Census, the city's population was 6,795 in 1,879 households. The following census in 2011 counted 6,471 people in 1,991 households. The 2016 census measured the population of the city as 6,735 people in 2,244 households.
