= Pishkhan Rural District =

Rural district in Gilan province, Iran

Pishkhan Rural District Persian: دهستان پیشخان
- Rural District
- Location within Iran
- Coordinates: 37°21′N 49°21′E
- Country: Iran
- Province: Gilan
- County: Sowme'eh Sara
- District: Central
- Established: 2021
- Capital: Pishkhan
- Time zone: UTC+3:30 (IRST)

Pishkhan Rural District (Persian: دهستان پیشخان) is in the Central District of Sowme'eh Sara County, Gilan province, Iran. Its capital is the village of Pishkhan, whose population at the time of the 2016 National Census was 607 in 239 households.

== History ==
Pishkhan Rural District was created in the Central District in 2021.

== Other villages in the rural district ==
- Azgom
- Cheneh Sar
- Chomesqal
- Chubeh
- Eslamabad
- Giaku
- Kharaf Kam
- Kohneh Sar
- Kolsar
- Qazdeh
- Sang Jub
