= Now Khaleh-ye Jafari =

Village in Gilan province, Iran

Now Khaleh-ye Jafari Persian: نوخاله جعفري
- Village
- Location within Iran
- Coordinates: 37°21′12″N 49°27′59″E
- Country: Iran
- Province: Gilan
- County: Sowme'eh Sara
- District: Tulem
- Rural District: Hend Khaleh

Population (2016)
  - Total: 1,971
- Time zone: UTC+3:30 (IRST)

Now Khaleh-ye Jafari (Persian: نوخاله جعفري) (Note: Also romanized as Now Khāleh-ye Ja‘farī and Nowkhāleh-ye Ja‘farī; also known as Kūhrūd, Nau-Khale, Now Khāleh, Now Khāleh Ja‘far, and Now Khaleh-ye Ja‘far) is a village in Hend Khaleh Rural District of Tulem District in Sowme'eh Sara County, Gilan province, Iran.

== Demographics ==
=== Population ===
At the time of the 2006 National Census, the village's population was 2,352 in 661 households. The following census in 2011 counted 2,281 people in 735 households. The 2016 census measured the population of the village as 1,971 people in 672 households.
