= Tulem Rural District =

Rural district in Gilan province, Iran

Tulem Rural District Persian: دهستان تولم
- Rural District
- Location within Iran
- Coordinates: 37°18′N 49°25′E
- Country: Iran
- Province: Gilan
- County: Sowme'eh Sara
- District: Tulem
- Established: 1987
- Capital: Matak

Population (2016)
  - Total: 8,043
- Time zone: UTC+3:30 (IRST)

Tulem Rural District (Persian: دهستان تولم) is in Tulem District of Sowme'eh Sara County, Gilan province, Iran. Its capital is the village of Lifshagerd. The previous capital of the rural district was the village of Matak.

== Demographics ==
=== Population ===
At the time of the 2006 National Census, the rural district's population was 9,451 in 2,597 households. There were 8,539 inhabitants in 2,748 households at the following census of 2011. The 2016 census measured the population of the rural district as 8,043 in 2,789 households. The most populous of its 22 villages was Lifshagerd, with 1,021 people.

=== Other villages in the rural district ===
- Bariran
- Budian
- Dalivandan
- Fallahabad
- Golabkhvaran
- Gurab
- Kalashem-e Pain
- Kharrat Mahalleh
- Khvajeh Alivandan
- Kolkuh
- Mardakheh-ye Bozorg
- Mardekheh-ye Kuchek
- Marsarud
- Sasemas
- Seyqalan
- Seyqalvandan
- Shalka
- Siyahtan
- Zimsar
