= Mazandaran Mahalleh, Mazandaran =

Mazandaran Mahalleh مازندران محله
- Village
- Interactive map of Mazandaran Mahalleh
- Coordinates: 36.736°N 50.971°E
- Country: Iran
- Province: Mazandaran
- County: Tonekabon
- Bakhsh: Nashta
- Rural District: Katra

Population (2016)
  - Total: 169
- Time zone: UTC+3:30 (IRST)

Mazandaran Mahalleh (Persian: مازندران محله, also Romanized as Māzandarān Maḩalleh) is a village in Katra Rural District, Nashta District, Tonekabon County, Mazandaran Province, Iran.

At the time of the 2006 National Census, the village's population was 184 in 53 households. The following census in 2011 counted 147 people in 42 households. The 2016 census measured the population of the village as 169 people in 63 households.
