= Mazandaran Mahalleh, Gilan =

Mazandaran Mahalleh مازندران محله
- Village
- Location within Iran
- Coordinates: 37°07′30″N 50°14′56″E
- Country: Iran
- Province: Gilan
- County: Rudsar
- Bakhsh: Central
- Rural District: Chini Jan

Population (2006)
  - Total: 85
- Time zone: UTC+3:30 (IRST)
  - Summer (DST): UTC+4:30 (IRDT)

Mazandaran Mahalleh (Persian: مازندران محله, also Romanized as Māzandarān Maḩalleh) is a village in Chini Jan Rural District, in the Central District of Rudsar County, Gilan Province, Iran. At the 2006 census, its population was 85, in 24 families.
