= Kamsar, Gilan =

Kamsar كمسر
- Village
- Location within Iran
- Coordinates: 37°07′20″N 49°27′08″E
- Country: Iran
- Province: Gilan
- County: Fuman
- Bakhsh: Central
- Rural District: Gasht

Population (2006)
  - Total: 232
- Time zone: UTC+3:30 (IRST)
  - Summer (DST): UTC+4:30 (IRDT)

Kamsar (Persian: كمسر, also Romanized as Kamsār and Komsār; also known as Komsara, Kūchak Komsār, and Kūmsār) is a village in Gasht Rural District, in the Central District of Fuman County, Gilan Province, Iran. At the 2006 census, its population was 232, in 67 families.
