= Kasma Rural District =

Rural district in Gilan province, Iran

Kasma Rural District Persian: دهستان كسما
- Rural District
- Location within Iran
- Coordinates: 37°19′N 49°19′E
- Country: Iran
- Province: Gilan
- County: Sowme'eh Sara
- District: Central
- Established: 1987
- Capital: Kasma

Population (2016)
  - Total: 12,198
- Time zone: UTC+3:30 (IRST)

Kasma Rural District (Persian: دهستان كسما) is in the Central District of Sowme'eh Sara County, Gilan province, Iran. Its capital is the village of Kasma.

== Demographics ==
=== Population ===
At the time of the 2006 National Census, the rural district's population was 16,062 in 4,557 households. There were 14,675 inhabitants in 4,611 households at the following census of 2011. The 2016 census measured the population of the rural district as 12,198 in 4,308 households. The most populous of its 36 villages was Kasma, with 1,508 people.

=== Other villages in the rural district ===
- Araban
- Dahandeh
- Dowgur
- Eshpalam
- Fashkham
- Jir Mahalleh-ye Kasma
- Jirgurab
- Kama
- Khakian
- Khatiban
- Ladmokh
- Miandeh
- Nofut
- Paskeh
- Pustin Sara
- Qassab Sara
- Rasteh Kenar
- Seyqalan
- Shaleh Pas
- Vaqeeh Dasht
- Zafan
