= Ziabar Rural District =

Rural district in Gilan province, Iran

Ziabar Rural District Persian: دهستان ضیابر
- Rural District
- Location within Iran
- Coordinates: 37°26′N 49°17′E
- Country: Iran
- Province: Gilan
- County: Sowme'eh Sara
- District: Ziabar
- Established: 1987
- Capital: Chakuvar

Population (2016)
  - Total: 9,866
- Time zone: UTC+3:30 (IRST)

Ziabar Rural District (Persian: دهستان ضیابر) is in Ziabar District of Sowme'eh Sara County, Gilan province, Iran. Its capital is the village of Chakuvar The previous capital of the rural district was the village of Ziabar, now a city.

== Demographics ==
=== Population ===
At the time of the 2006 National Census, the rural district's population (as a part of the Central District) was 11,387 in 3,234 households. There were 10,939 inhabitants in 3,416 households at the following census of 2011. The 2016 census measured the population of the rural district as 9,866 in 3,374 households. The most populous of its 33 villages was Ziabar (now a city), with 3,603 people.

In 2021, the rural district was separated from the district in the formation of Ziabar District.

=== Other villages in the rural district ===
- Bisheh Sara
- Esfand
- Jirsar-e Nowdeh
- Katemjan-e Motamedi
- Katemjan-e Seyyed Abd ol Vahhabi
- Katemjan-e Yusefali
- Lashmar Zamakh
- Now Pashan
- Nowdeh
