= Ziabar District =

District in Gilan province, Iran

Ziabar District Persian: بخش ضیابر
- District
- Location within Iran
- Coordinates: 37°27′N 49°15′E
- Country: Iran
- Province: Gilan
- County: Sowme'eh Sara
- Established: 2021
- Capital: Ziabar
- Time zone: UTC+3:30 (IRST)

Ziabar District (Persian: بخش ضیابر) is in Sowme'eh Sara County, Gilan province, Iran. Its capital is the city of Ziabar, whose population as a village at the time of the 2016 National Census was 3,603 people in 1,193 households.

== History ==
In 2021, Ziabar Rural District was separated from the Central District in the formation of Ziabar District. The village of Ziabar was converted to a city in 2023.

== Demographics ==
=== Administrative divisions ===
Ziabar District
Administrative Divisions
Bahambar RD
Ziabar RD
Ziabar (city)
RD = Rural District
