= Tulem District =

District in Gilan province, Iran

Tulem District Persian: بخش تولم
- District
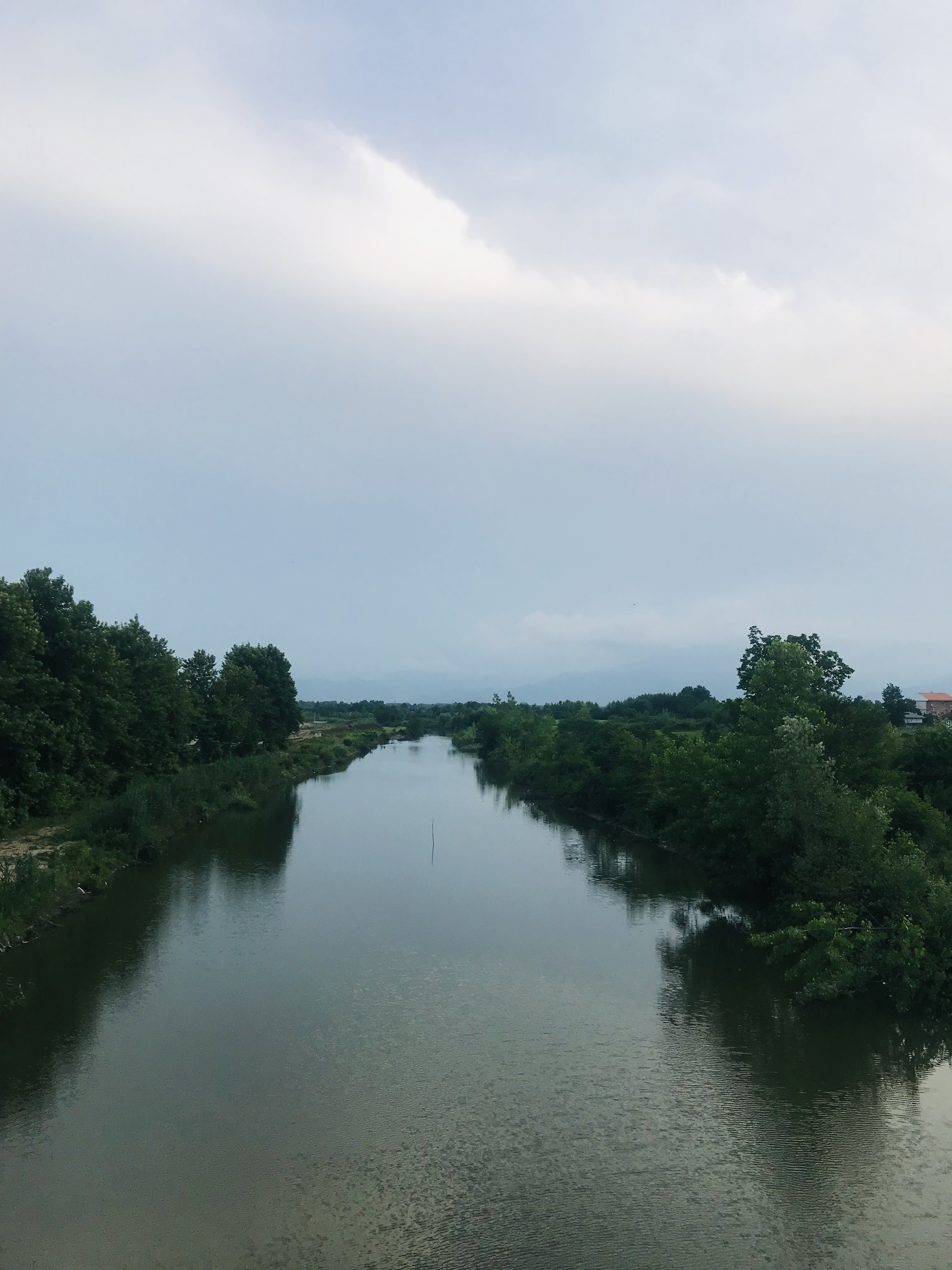
- Pish Rudbar River at Marjaghal

- Location within Iran
- Coordinates: 37°20′N 49°26′E
- Country: Iran
- Province: Gilan
- County: Sowme'eh Sara
- Capital: Marjaghal

Population (2016)
  - Total: 25,791
- Time zone: UTC+3:30 (IRST)

Tulem District (Persian: بخش تولم) is in Sowme'eh Sara County, Gilan province, Iran. Its capital is the city of Marjaghal.

== Demographics ==
=== Population ===
At the time of the 2006 National Census, the district's population was 29,355 in 8,131 households. The following census in 2011 counted 27,582 people in 8,714 households. The 2016 census measured the population of the district as 25,791 inhabitants in 8,769 households.

=== Administrative divisions ===
Tulem District Population
Administrative Divisions	2006	2011	2016
Hend Khaleh RD	13,109	12,572	11,013
Tulem RD	9,451	8,539	8,043
Marjaghal (city)	6,795	6,471	6,735
Total	29,355	27,582	25,791
RD = Rural District
