= Central District (Sowme'eh Sara County) =

District in Gilan province, Iran

Central District (Sowme'eh Sara County) Persian: بخش مرکزی شهرستان صومعه‌سرا
- District
- Location within Iran
- Coordinates: 37°20′N 49°20′E
- Country: Iran
- Province: Gilan
- County: Sowme'eh Sara
- Capital: Sowme'eh Sara

Population (2016)
  - Total: 78,144
- Time zone: UTC+3:30 (IRST)

The Central District of Sowme'eh Sara County (Persian: بخش مرکزی شهرستان صومعه‌سرا) is in Gilan province, Iran. Its capital is the city of Sowme'eh Sara.

== History ==
In 2021, Pishkhan Rural District was created in the district, and Taher Gurab Rural District was separated from it in the formation of Taher Gurab District. Ziabar Rural District was also separated from the Central District in the establishment of Ziabar District.

== Demographics ==
=== Population ===
At the time of the 2006 census, the district's population was 75,412 in 21,126 households. The following census in 2011 counted 77,089 people in 23,681 households. The 2016 census measured the population of the district as 78,144 inhabitants in 26,192 households.

=== Administrative divisions ===
Central District (Sowme'eh Sara County) Population
Administrative Divisions	2006	2011	2016
Kasma RD	16,062	14,675	12,198
Pishkhan RD (Note: Established after the 2016 census)			
Taher Gurab RD (Note: Transferred to Taher Gurab District after the 2016 census)	11,441	10,497	8,997
Ziabar RD (Note: Transferred to Ziabar District after the 2016 census)	11,387	10,939	9,866
Sowme'eh Sara (city)	36,522	40,978	47,083
Total	75,412	77,089	78,144
RD = Rural District
