= Sowme'eh Sara County =

County in Gilan province, Iran

Sowme'eh Sara County Persian: شهرستان صومعه‌سرا
- County
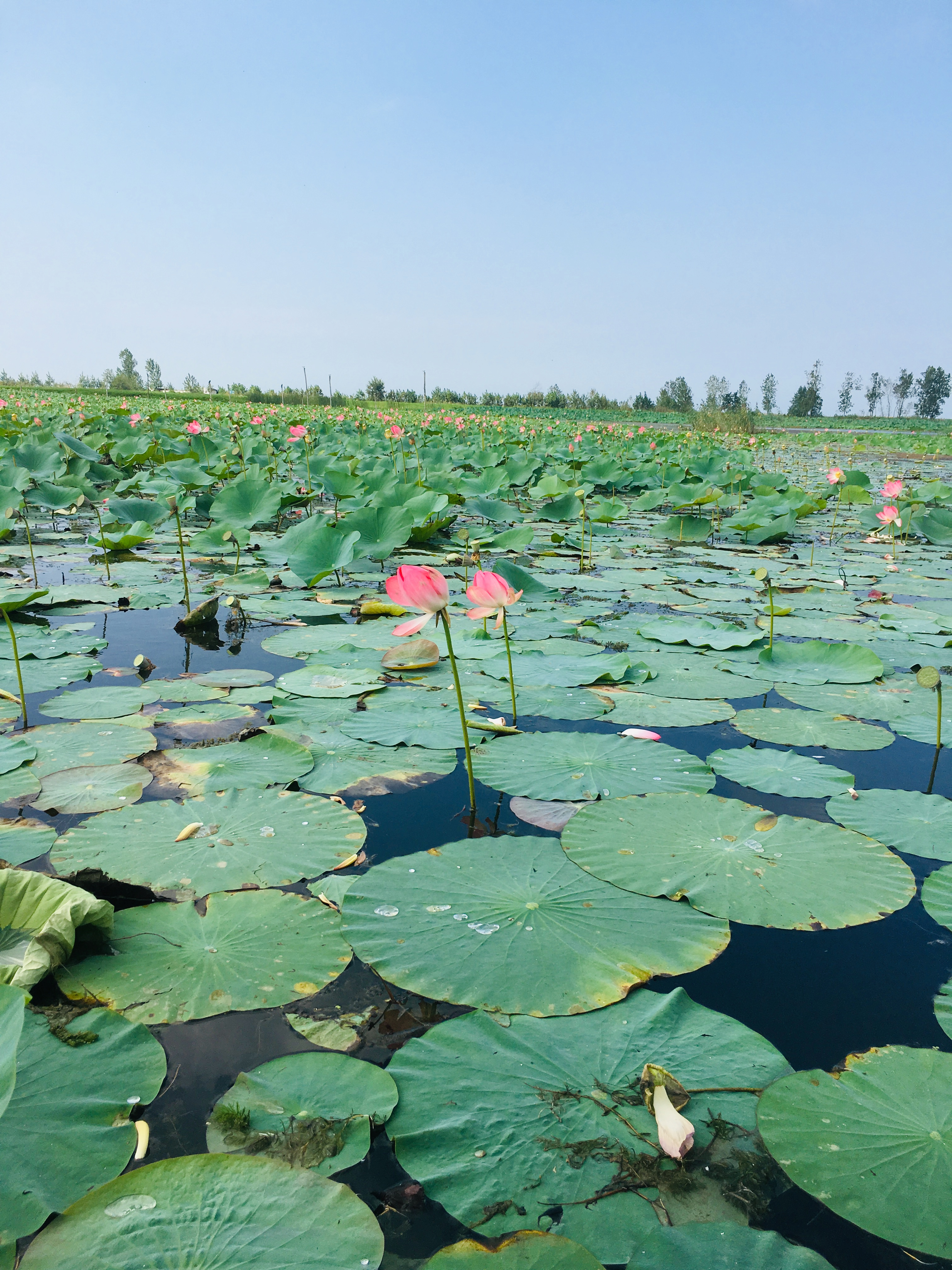
- Selke Wildlife Refuge in Sowme'eh Sara County

- Location of Sowme'eh Sara County in Gilan province (center, yellow)

- Location of Gilan province in Iran
- Coordinates: 37°23′N 49°17′E
- Country: Iran
- Province: Gilan
- Capital: Sowme'eh Sara
- Districts: Central, Mirza Kuchek Janghli, Taher Gurab, Tulem, Ziabar

Population (2016)
  - Total: 125,074
- Time zone: UTC+3:30 (IRST)

Sowme'eh Sara County (Persian: شهرستان صومعه‌سرا) is in Gilan province, Iran. Its capital is the city of Sowme'eh Sara. The county is in the west of Gilan and is surrounded by Fuman County, Masal County, and Bandar-e Anzali County.

== History ==
In 2021, Pishkhan Rural District was created in the Central District, and Taher Gurab Rural District was separated from it in the formation of Taher Gurab District, which was divided into two rural districts, including the new Abatar Rural District. Ziabar Rural District was also separated from the Central District to form Ziabar District, which was divided into two rural districts, including the new Bahambar Rural District. The villages of Taher Gurab and Ziabar were converted to cities in 2023.

== Demographics ==
=== Population ===
At the time of the 2006 census, the county's population was 129,629 in 35,636 households. The following census in 2011 counted 127,757 people in 39,238 households. The 2016 census measured the population of the county as 125,074 in 41,975 households.

=== Administrative divisions ===
Sowme'eh Sara County's population history and administrative structure over three consecutive censuses are shown in the following table.

Sowme'eh Sara County Population
Administrative Divisions	2006	2011	2016
Central District	75,412	77,089	78,144
Kasma RD	16,062	14,675	12,198
Pishkhan RD (Note: Established after the 2016 census)			
Taher Gurab RD	11,441	10,497	8,997
Ziabar RD	11,387	10,939	9,866
Sowme'eh Sara (city)	36,522	40,978	47,083
Mirza Kuchek Janghli District	24,862	23,086	21,139
Gurab Zarmikh RD	15,672	14,333	12,774
Markiyeh RD	5,007	4,165	3,525
Gurab Zarmikh (city)	4,183	4,588	4,840
Taher Gurab District			
Abatar RD			
Taher Gurab RD			
Taher Gurab (city) (Note: Became a city after the 2016 census)			
Tulem District	29,355	27,582	25,791
Hend Khaleh RD	13,109	12,572	11,013
Tulem RD	9,451	8,539	8,043
Marjaghal (city)	6,795	6,471	6,735
Ziabar District			
Bahambar RD			
Ziabar RD			
Ziabar (city)			
Total	129,629	127,757	125,074
RD = Rural District

== See also ==
Media related to Sowme'eh Sara County at Wikimedia Commons
