= Gujarat under Muhammad Shah =

Timeline of Gujarat history

The Mughal Empire's province Gujarat (now in India) was managed by the viceroys appointed by the emperors. The emperor Farrukhsiyar was deposed by influential Sayad brothers in 1719. He was succeeded by the short reigns of Rafi ud-Darajat and Shah Jahan II. Finally Muhammad Shah was raised to the throne by them. To make peace with powerful vassal, he appointed Ajítsingh of Márwár as a viceroy. The Maratha incursions continued and Píláji Gáikwár established himself at Songad near southern border of Gujarat. Ajit Singh had appointed Anopsingh Bhandari as his deputy. For helping to depose the influential Sayad brothers, Haidar Kúli Khán was appointed the next viceroy. People discontent with Anopsingh rejoiced his appointment but he tried to make himself free so he was recalled. Nizám-ul-Mulk took over who had to face the Maratha incursion again. The Marathas taking advantage of weakening Mughal Empire started extracting tribute from Gujarat regularly. The next viceroy Sarbuland Khan came in conflict with the Marathas whose generals were first defeated at Kapadvanj and again at Aras. The infighting in Marathas later stalled their advances. The imperial troops was sent by the emperor to help. Finally the Marathas were defeated at Sojitra and Kapadvanj and pushed back from their inroads in Gujarat. In subsequent years, the Marathas attacked Vadnagar and later captured Baroda, Dabhoi and Champaner. The growing power of Marathas in the southern Gujarat can not be contained.

In 1730, Abheysingh was appointed as the viceroy who defeated Mubáriz-ul-Mulk at Adalaj who has opposed his appointment. He soon allied with Maratha Peshwa and defeated another Maratha Gaikwar. He returned to Marwar placing Ratansingh Bhandari, his deputy, in charge. He recovered Baroda but his rivalry with other Mughal leaders Momin Khan and Sohrab Khan weaken him. Soon Momin Khan was appointed as the viceroy but he had to laid siege of Ahmedabad to be in power as Ratansingh had not complied with the order. Soon the emperor reappointed Abheysingh but Momin Khan continued siege. He took help of Damaji Gaikwar and finally captured Ahmedabad. He had to share revenues with Gaikwars but soon disagreements rose and they had fights. He tried to manage his control over Gujarat but the Marathas keep growing and expanding their power. After death of Momin Khan, Fidá-ud-dín managed the province foe a while. Abdúl Ázíz Khán, the commander of Junnar near Pune came to power due to forged order but later had to relinquish. Muftakhir Khán, son of Momin Khan, appointed as the next viceroy. During his reign, the Marathas came to Ahmedabad and continued to attack towns in central Gujarat. Fakhr-ud-daulah succeeded him. He had some peace due to internal struggles between the different houses of the Marathas had slow down their advances in Gujarat. In 1748, Muhammad Shah died and he was succeeded by his son Ahmad Shah Bahadur.

== Viceroys under Muhammad Shah (1719–1748) ==
Early in 1719, the emperor Farrukhsiyar was deposed and put to death by his nobles the Sayads; and a prince named Rafi ud-Darajat, a grandson of the emperor, was raised to the throne. Rafi ud-Darajat was put to death by the Sayads after a reign of three months, and his brother Rafi ud-Daulah as Shah Jahan II, who succeeded him, also died after a few days' reign. The Sayads then raised to the throne prince Roshan Akhtar Bahadur with the title of Muhammad Shah.

=== Mahárája Ajítsingh, Forty-ninth Viceroy, 1719–1721 ===
After the murder of Farrukhsiyar, the most powerful vassal in the neighbourhood of Delhi was Ajítsingh of Márwár. To win him to their side the Sayads granted him the viceroyalty of Gujarát, and Míhr Áli Khán was appointed to act for him until his arrival, while Muhammad Bahádur Bábi, son of Salábat Muhammad Khán Bábi, was placed in charge of the police of the district immediately round Áhmedábád. Shortly after, through the influence of the Mahárája Ajítsingh, Náhir Khán superseded Míhr Áli Khán as deputy viceroy. Náhir Khán was also appointed to the charge of Dholka, Dahod and Petlad, and made superintendent of customs. About this time the head tax was repealed, and orders were issued that its levy in Gujarát should cease.

Píláji Gáikwár at Songaḍ, 1719.

In the same year, 1719, Píláji Gáikwár marched on Surat with a large army and defeated the Mughal troops commanded by Sayad Âkil and Muhammad Panáh, the latter commander being taken prisoner and forced to pay a heavy ransom. Píláji, finding Gujarát an easy prey, made frequent incursions, and taking Songaḍ in the extreme south-east established himself there. Míhr Áli Khán, who had been acting for Náhir Khán, marched against and subdued the Kolis, who were committing piracy in the Mahi estuary.

Decay of Imperial Power, 1720.

From 1720, Mughal rule in Gujarát was doomed. Píláji Gáikwár was established at Songaḍ, and in the anarchy that ensued, the great Gujarát houses of the Bábis and Jháloris, as well as the newly arrived Momín Khán, turned their thoughts to independence. Ajítsingh so hated Mughal rule that he secretly favoured the Maráthás, and strove to establish his own authority over such portions of Gujarát as bordered on Márwár. In after years, Sarbuland Khán made a vigorous attempt to reassert Mughal dominion, but the seeds of dissolution were sown and efforts at recovery were vain.

In 1720, Ajítsingh the viceroy sent Anopsingh Bhandári to Gujarát as his deputy. In this year Nizám-ul-Mulk, viceroy of Ujjain, was superseded by Sayad Diláwar Khán. While Diláwar Khán was yet on the Málwa frontiers the Nizám desirous of possessing himself of the Dakhan (Deccan) and its resources retired to burhanpur pursued by Sayad Diláwar Khán, who giving battle was killed, the Nizám retiring to Aurangabad in the Dakhan. Álam Áli Khán, deputy viceroy of the Dakhan, was directed to march against him, while from north Gujarát Anopsingh Bhandári was ordered to send 10,000 horse to Surat, and Náhir Khán, the deputy viceroy, was instructed to proceed thither in person. The Nizám and Álam Áli Khán met near Bálápur in the Berárs and a battle was fought in which the Nizám was successful and Álam Khán was slain. At this time Anopsingh Bhandári committed many oppressive acts, of which the chief was the murder of Kapurchand Bhansáli, the leading merchant of Áhmedábád. The cause of Kapurchand's murder was that he had hired a number of armed retainers who used to oppose the Bhandári's orders and set free people unjustly imprisoned by him. To remove this meddler from his way the Bhandári got him assassinated.

Nizám-ul-Mulk Prime Minister, of the Empire, 1721

In 1721, Nizám-ul-Mulk was appointed prime minister of the empire, Abdúl Hamíd Khán was recalled from Sorath, and in his stead Asad Kuli Khán, with the title of Amir-ul-Umara, was appointed governor of Sorath and sent Muhammad Sharíf Khán into Sorath as his deputy.

=== Haidar Kúli Khán, Fiftieth Viceroy, 1721–22 ===
In 1721, in conjunction with Muhammad Amín and Saádat Khán, Haidar Kúli Khán freed the emperor from the tyranny of the Sayads, and was rewarded with the title of Muîz-ud-daulah Haidar Kúli Khán Bahádur Zafar Jang and the viceroyalty of Gujarát. He obtained the appointment of minister for his brother Jaâfar Kúli Khán. Maâsúm Kúli Khán was dignified by the title of Shujáât Khán Bahádur and appointed deputy viceroy.

Disorder in Áhmedábád, 1721 As soon as this change was notified, the people of Áhmedábád, who were discontented with the rule of Anopsingh Bhandari, attacked his palace, the Bhadra, and he escaped with difficulty. In consequence of the enmity between Haidar Kúli Khán and the Márwáris, Shujáât Khán, the deputy viceroy, attacked the house of Náhir Khán who had been Ajítsingh's minister, and forced him to pay Rupees 100000 and leave the city. Shujáât Khán next interfered with the lands of Safdar Khán Bábi, the deputy governor of Godhra, and his brothers. On one of the brothers repairing to Delhi and remonstrating, Haidar Kúli, restored their lands to the Bábis. In consequence of this decision ill-feeling sprung up between Shujáât Khán and the Bábis, and when Shujáât Khán went to exact tribute he forced Muhammad Khán Bábi, governor of Kaira (Kheda district), to pay a special fine of Rupees 10000. Shortly after one of the viceroy's officers, Kásím Áli Khán, while employed against the Kolis of that part of the country, was killed at Pethapur. Shujáât Khán advanced, and revenged Kásím Áli's death by burning the town. Next, he passed into Sorath, and after exacting tribute, crossed to Kutch. The chief opposed him, and in the fight that followed was beaten and forced to pay about Rupees 225000. In 1721, a Sayad was sent to Sorath as deputy governor in place of Muhammad Sharíf, and Haidar Kúli was appointed governor of Kadi, the Chúnvál, and Halvad (called Muhammadnagar), and put in charge of Tharad, Arjanpur, Bhámnárli, Pethápur, and Kheralu in place of Vakhatsingh, son of the Mahárája Ajítsingh.

Early in 1722, Nizám-ul-Mulk took up the office of prime minister of the empire, to which he had been appointed in the previous year. Strenuous efforts were made to embroil him with Haidar Kúli Khán, as the Nizám's austerity and craft were a source of not less anxiety to the Dehli court than Haidar Kúli's more daring and restless ambition. Haidar Kúli Khán, unable to contend with the Nizám, left Dehli and retired to Gujarát. On his way the villagers of Dabháli opposed him killing one of his chief men named Alif Beg Khán. Haidar burned the village and put all the people to death, a severity which caused such terror that throughout his rule no difficulty was experienced in realizing tribute or in keeping the roads safe. About this time, among other changes, Muhammad Bahádúr, son of Salábat Khán Bábi, was placed in charge of Sádra and Virpur, with the title of Sher Khán. Shortly after his arrival the viceroy marched against and subdued the rebellious Kolis of the Chunvál, appointing Rustam Áli Khán his governor there. Then, returning to Áhmedábád, he took up his residence in the Bhadra.

Shows signs of Independence and is Recalled, 1722. At this time Haidar Kúli aimed at bringing all Gujarát under his rule. He seized the imperial horses which passed through Áhmedábád on their way to Delhi, and confiscated many estates and gave them to his own men. On his way to enforce tribute from the Dungarpúr chiefs, he levied Rupees 80,000 from Lunavada. Through the mediation of the Udaipur Rána, and as he agreed to pay a tribute of Rupees 100000, the Rával of Dungarpur escaped. Haidar Kúli next proceeded to Vijapur, north of Áhmedábád, but hearing that the emperor was displeased at his assumption of the power of giving and changing grants of land, he returned to Áhmedábád and restored several estates which he had confiscated.

=== Nizám-ul-Mulk, Fifty-first Viceroy, 1722 ===
As the emperor continued to distrust Haidar Kúli Khan for his act to be free, and at the close of 1722 appointed Jumlat-ul-Mulk Nizám-ul-Mulk fifty-first viceroy.

Haidar Kúli Khán, finding himself no match for the Nizám, was induced to retire quietly, and accordingly left Gujarát by way of Dungarpur. Shujáât Khán and Rustam Áli Khán accompanied him as far as Dungarpúr, and then returned to Áhmedábád. In the meantime the Nizám had reached Ujjain, and then directed Safdar Khán Bábi to carry on the government till he should arrive, appointing at the same time his uncle Hámid Khán as deputy viceroy and Fidwi Khán as minister. Subsequently, the Nizám came to Gujarát and chose officers of his own for places of trust, the chief of whom was Momín Khán, who was appointed governor of Surat. The Nizám then returned to Delhi, but, after a short time, disgusted with his treatment at court, he retired to the Dakhan (Deccan), where, making Hyderabad his capital, he gradually began to act as an independent ruler. Meanwhile, in Gujarát dissensions sprang up between Hámid Khán and other officers, but matters were arranged without any outbreak of hostility. Tribute was exacted from the chiefs on the banks of the Vatrak river and from Modhera an unruly Koli village was burned down, and garrisons were placed in the Koli country. In 1723 Rustam Áli Khán and Shujáât Khán were ordered from Delhi to march on Jodhpur, which they captured and plundered, and then returned to Áhmedábád.

Marathas return

In 1723, Piláji Gáikwár, who had been long hovering on the frontier, marched on Surat and was opposed by Momín Khán, whom he defeated. After levying contributions from the surrounding country, he returned to his headquarters at Songad, and from this overran a considerable portion of the Surat territory, building several forts in the Rájpípla country. At the same time Kántáji Kadam Bánde, invading Gujarát from the side of Dahod, began to levy fixed contributions.

Though before this occasional demands had often been made, 1723 was the first year in which the Maráthás imposed a regular tribute on Gujarát. Momín Khán was now appointed provincial minister, and Rustam Áli Khán succeeded him as revenue officer of Surat.

=== Sarbuland Khan, Fifty-second Viceroy, 1723–1730 ===
As Nizám had gone to the Dakhan without the emperor's leave, Mubáriz-ul-Mulk Sarbuland Khan Bahádur Diláwar Jang was appointed fifty-second viceroy of Gujarát. He selected Shujáât Khán as his deputy, and made other arrangements for the government of the province. Hámid Khán, uncle and deputy of the Nizám, prepared to oppose Shujáât Khán, but through the intervention of Bábis Salábat Khán, Safdar Khán, and Jawán Mard Khán, Hámid Khán evacuated the Bhadra, and withdrew to Dahod. Shujáât Khán now went to collect tribute, leaving Ibráhím Kúli Khán at Áhmedábád, while Rámrái was posted at Mahudha in Kaira, with orders to watch the movements of Hámid Khán. As the viceroy was in need of money, he farmed to one Jívan Jugal the districts of Jambusar, Makbúlábad or Amod about twenty-two miles north of Bharuch, Dholka, and Bharuch. In 1724, he came to Áhmedábád with Áli Muhammad Khán father of the author of the Mirát-i-Áhmedi, as his private minister.

Rustam Áli, governor of Surat, having succeeded twice or thrice in defeating the Maráthás under Píláji Gáikwár, now offered, in conjunction with his brother Shujáât Khán, that if 20,000 men were placed under their orders, they would march against the Nizám. The emperor accepted this offer, allowing Rustam Áli to draw on the Surat treasury to the extent of Rupees 200000. Rustam Áli accordingly, with the aid of Áhmed Kúli his brother's son, equipped an army. In the meantime the Nizám was not idle. He promised to Kántáji Kadam Bánde a one-fourth share of the revenue of Gujarát, provided he should be able, in concert with Hámid Khán, to re-conquer the province from Mubáriz-ul-Mulk. Shujáât Khán, who was now at Kadi, instead of following the advice of his minister and carefully watching Hámid Khán's movements from Kapadvanj, went to a distant part of the province. Hámid Khán seeing his opportunity, united his forces with those of Kántáji Kadam, and marched to Kapadvanj. Shujáât Khán hearing of this, advanced towards Áhmedábád and encamped at Dabhoda near Áhmedábád and then proceeded to Mota Medra, about six miles east of the capital. When he came so near Áhmedábád, many of his soldiers went without leave into the city to visit their families. The Maráthás attacked his rear guard, and his men giving way took to flight. Hámid Khán seeing that Shujáât Khán had but a small force, marched between him and the capital. A battle was fought, in which Shujáât Khán was slain, and his two sons Hasan Kúli and Mustafa Kúli were taken prisoners. Shujáât Khán's head was cut off and sent to Safdar Khán Bábi, to be sent to Ibráhím Kúli his son, who was doing duty as commandant at Áhmedábád. Hámid Khán took up his quarters in and got possession of all Áhmedábád except the city. Hámid Khán now sent a message to the emperor, that the Maráthás had been successful in defeating Shujáât Khán and conquering Gujarát, but that he had defended Áhmedábád against them. The emperor sent him a dress of honour, but after a few days discovered that Hámid's message was false. The Maráthás now marched through the country, collecting their chauth or one-fourth and their sardeshmukhi or one-tenth shares of the revenue. Kántáji went to Viramgam and besieged the town, but on the promise of one of the chief inhabitants to raise a sum of Rupees 350000, the Maráthás retired. Hámid Khán who was now independent began to bestow lands and districts many of which remained with the grantees and were never recovered by future governors. Ibráhím Kúli, son of Shujáât Khán, in revenge for his father's death, determined to assassinate Hámid Khán. The attempt failed. Hámid Khán escaped and Ibráhím Kúli was slain.

Battle of Arás

Rustam Áli Khán, governor of Surat, in the hope of being revenged on Hámid Khán, invited the aid of Píláji Gáikwár, and it was agreed that they should meet on the north bank of the Narmada River. Píláji promised to aid Rustam Khán, and the allied armies, crossing the Mahi River, encamped at Aras in the plain between Anand Anand and the Mahi. Hámid Khán, accompanied by Mír Nathu, Muhammad Salábat Rohila, and Kántáji Kadam, marched to oppose Rustam Khán. Hámid Khán also entered into secret negotiations with Píláji Gáikwár, who resolved to remain neutral and side with the conqueror. A battle was fought, in which, though Piláji took no part, Hámid Khán was defeated and put to flight, and Mír Nathu was killed. After the fight Rustam Áli remained on the field of battle and liberated his nephews, plundering Hámid Khán's camp. Píláji plundered Rustam Áli's camp and then moved off, while Kántáji carried away what was left in the camp of Hámid Khán. Hámid Khán reproached Kántáji for his inactivity; but he pleaded in excuse that he was watching the mode of warfare amongst Mughals, and promised to attack Rustam Áli shortly. Now, as the Maráthás really desired to ruin Rustam Áli, who was their bitter foe, they after a few days surrounded him and cut off his supplies. Rustam Áli stood a blockade of eight days, and then forced his way through his enemies and went to Nápád, (about fourteen miles west of the Vásad railway station in the Anand district), and then through Kalamsar to Nápa or Nába under Petlad. The Maráthás still pursuing Rustam Áli retired to Vasu under Petlád where he gave battle, and by a furious charge broke the Marátha line. The Maráthás rallied, and Rustam Áli and his men were defeated, Rustam Áli being slain and his nephews again taken prisoners. Rustam was buried on the field of battle and his head sent to Áhmedábád.

Hámid Khán returned to Áhmedábád with the Maráthás, who saw that their only means of effecting a permanent footing in the province was by supporting him. Hámid Khán then assigned a one-fourth share of the revenue of the territory north of the Mahi to Kántáji, and to Píláji a corresponding interest in the territory south of the Mahi, including Surat and Baroda. After this Hámid Khán acted tyrannically. He extorted large sums from the rich, and poisoned the two sons of Shujáât Khán.

When the news of Kántáji's and Píláji's success reached the Dakhan, Trimbak Rao Dabhade, son of Khanderáv Senápati, came with a large army and laid siege to Cambay. While the siege was being pressed a quarrel among the Marátha leaders culminated in strife and bloodshed. Trimbak Rao was wounded or killed and the Marátha army had to disperse and retire.

Mubáriz-ul-Mulk recaptures the province from Hamid Khan and the Maráthás, 1725.

Salábat Khán, leaving Áhmedábád, went to Víramgám, and after some time, placing his nephew at Víramgám, he went into Gohilwad. When the news of the defeat and death of Rustam Áli reached Delhi, the emperor ordered Mubáriz-ul-Mulk to take a strong army and proceed in person to Gujarát and expel Hámid Khán and the Maráthás. Mubáriz-ul-Mulk marched on Gujarát with a large army, assisted by Mahárája Abheysingh of Jodhpur, Chatarsingh Rája of Narwar in Bundelkhand, Gandrapsingh, and the Mahárána of Udaipur. On his arrival at Ajmer, Mubáriz-ul-Mulk was received by his private minister Áli Muhammad Khán, who afterwards joined Jawán Mard Khán Bábi in Rádhanpur, and united their troops with those under Mubáriz-ul-Mulk. At that time Salábat Khán was removed from his government, and Safdar Khán Bábi died. In obedience to the imperial order, Mubáriz-ul-Mulk marched from Ajmer and came to the Gujarát frontier. On his approach Hámid Khán returned to Áhmedábád. He placed Rúpsingh and Sardár Muhammad Ghorni in charge of the city and himself withdrew to Mehmúdábád. Mubáriz-ul-Mulk now sent Sheikh Alíyár in advance with an army against Áhmedábád. When Sheikh Alíyár arrived before the city, Muhammad Ghorni, who was dissatisfied with Hámid Khán for bringing in the Maráthás, persuaded Rúpsingh to fly.

In the meantime Mubáriz-ul-Mulk with the main body of his forces reached Sidhpur. Hámid Khán, accompanied by a detachment of Marátha horse, now returned to Áhmedábád; but Muhammad Ghorni closed the gates, and would not suffer him to enter the city. Mubáriz-ul-Mulk marched to Mehsana. About this time Áli Muhammad Khán, the father of the author of the Mirăt-i-Áhmedi, who was now with Mubáriz-ul-Mulk at Mehsána, advised him to conciliate the influential family of Bábi. Under his advice, Salábat Muhammad Khán Bábi was appointed governor of Víramgám, and Jawán Mard Khán governor of Pátan. Shortly afterwards Murlidhardás, the Gujaráti minister of Hámid Khán, deserted his master's declining cause. When Kantáji heard that Mubáriz-ul-Mulk had arrived at Pethápur, only eighteen miles from Áhmedábád, he retired to Mehmúdábád. Before the close of 1725, Mubáriz-ul-Mulk reached Áhmedábád, where he was well received by the officials and merchants.

Hámid Khán and Kantáji, who had by this time reached the banks of the Mahi river, were now joined by Píláji Gáikwár. The Marátha leaders, seeing that the only way to preserve their footing in the province was to espouse the cause of Hámid Khán, united their forces with his, and prepared to march on Áhmedábád. Mubáriz-ul-Mulk deputed his son Khánahzád Khán with an army to oppose them, and made several appointments, among other changes raising Áli Muhammad Khán to the post of minister.

Defeat of the Maráthás at Sojitra and Kapadvanj, 1725

Khánahzád Khán met the Maráthás near Sojitra, about ten miles north-west of Petlád, and defeated them, pursuing them as far as the Mahi. Then, returning, he was reinforced by his brother Sháh Nawáz Khán, and marched against the Maráthás, who were encamped at Kapadvanj. Another battle was fought, and the Maráthás were again defeated and pursued as far as the hills of Áli-Mohan now Chhota Udaipur in the extreme east of the province. Khánahzád Khán now appointed Hasan-ud-dín governor of Baroda, Bharuch, Jambusar, and Makbulábád.

Marátha Expedition against Vadnagar, 1725

Meanwhile, Antáji Bháskar, a Marátha noble, entering Gujarát from the side of Idar, laid siege to the town of Vadnagar, which, according to the old Gujarát proverb, with Umreth in the Kaira district, are the two golden feathers of the kingdom of Gujarát. Vadnagar was inhabited by wealthy Bráhmans of the Nágar caste who prayed Mubáriz-ul-Mulk to march to their relief; but as both his sons were in pursuit of the other Marátha bands defeated at Kapadvanj, the viceroy had no troops to spare from the Áhmedábád garrison. The Nágars accordingly, seeing no prospect of help, paid a sum of Rupees 400000 and Antáji Bháskar retired. Kantáji and Píláji, encouraged by this raid of Antáji's, entered Gujarát from different quarters. Kántáji again laid siege to Vadnagar. The Nágars, unable to pay the contribution demanded, leaving their property fled and Kántáji in his attempts to unearth the buried treasure burned down the town.

Shortly afterwards Umreth in the Kaira district suffered a similar fate at the hands of Kántáji. In one of his raids Píláji Gáikwár advancing as far as Baroda was met by Khánahzád Khán, the son of the viceroy. Distrusting the issue of a battle Píláji fled to Cambay, and from Cambay withdrew to Sorath. For these services the emperor raised Khánahzád Khán to the rank of a noble, with the title Ghálib Jang. About this time Áli Muhammad Khán was dismissed from the post of minister, and in his stead first Muhammad Sayad Beg and afterwards Muhammad Sulaimán were appointed. Not long afterwards Áli Muhammad Khán was again entrusted with a command and raised to be governor of Dholka.

The Maráthás retired to the Dakhan, but, returning in 1726, compelled Mubáriz-ul-Mulk to confirm his predecessor's grants in their favour. The emperor refused to acknowledge any cessions of revenue to the Maráthás; and the viceroy, hard pressed for money, unable to obtain support from the court and receiving little help from his impoverished districts, was forced to impose fresh taxes on the citizens of Áhmedábád, and at the same time to send an army to collect their tribute from the Mahi chiefs. As part of the agreement between Mubáriz-ul-Mulk and the Marátha chiefs Píláji was to receive a share in the revenue of the districts south of the Mahi. But Peshwa Bajirao Balál, to whom, as agent of his rival Khanderáv Dábháde, Píláji was obnoxious, sent Udáji Pavár to drive Píláji away. In this Udáji was successful, and defeating Píláji forced him to seek the aid of Kántáji. Kántáji, perceiving that if the Peshwa became supreme his own independence would suffer, joined Píláji, and marching together upon Baroda they endeavoured, but without success, to prevent the Mughal governor Sadr-ud-dín Khán from entering the city. About this time want of funds forced Mubáriz-ul-Mulk to sell the greater part of the Dholka district to different landholders.

In the following year, 1727, Bájiráv Peshwa began to negotiate with Mubáriz-ul-Mulk, undertaking that if the one-fourth and one-tenth shares in the revenue of the province were guaranteed to him, he would protect Gujarát from other invaders. Though he did not consent to these proposals, the viceroy so far accepted the alliance of the Peshwa as to allow the governor of Baroda to aid Udáji Pavár against Píláji.

Piláji Gáikwár obtains Baroda and Dabhoi, 1727.

Piláji and Kántáji outmanœuvred Udáji and prevented him from effecting a junction with the governor of Baroda, who in the end was forced to abandon both that city and the stronghold of Dabhoi, while Udáji retired to Málwa. Píláji Gáikwár now obtained possession of Baroda. Mubáriz-ul-Mulk, still sorely pressed for funds, marched into Sorath to exact tribute. On reaching Víramgám, Salábat Muhammad Khán Bábi, on behalf of the Jám of Nawánagar, presented the viceroy with Rupees 100000, and for this service was rewarded with the gift of an elephant. Mubáriz-ul-Mulk then marched against Chháya, the capital of the chief of Porbandar in the south-west of Káthiáwad. This chief, by putting to sea, hoped to escape the payment of tribute. But on hearing that the viceroy proposed to annex his territory and appoint an officer to govern it, he returned and agreed to pay a tribute of Rupees 40,000. On his way back to Áhmedábád, Mubáriz-ul-Mulk passed through Halvad in Jháláváḍa, and there married the daughter of Jhála Pratápsingh, the chief of that district, whom he accordingly exempted from the payment of tribute. About this time the viceroy received orders from the emperor to restore certain land which he had confiscated, and as he neglected to obey, certain estates of his in the Panjáb were resumed.

Capture of Chámpáner by the Maráthás, 1728.

In the meantime Krishnáji, foster son of Kántáji, made a sudden attack upon Champaner and captured that fortress, and from that time Kántáji's agents remained permanently in Gujarát to collect his share of the tribute.

In 1728 the minister Momín Khán died, and in his place the emperor selected Momín Khán's brother Abd-ul-Ghani Khán. About this time Asad Áli, governor of Junágaḍh, also died, and on his deathbed appointed Salábat Muhammad Khán Bábi, deputy governor of that fortress. Salábat Muhammad Khán sent his son Sher Khán Bábi to act on his behalf. When the emperor heard of the death of Asad Áli, he appointed Ghulám Muhy-ud-dín Khán, son of the late Asad Áli, governor. Ghulám Muhy-ud-dín did not proceed to Junágaḍh but continued Sher Khán Bábi as his deputy perceiving that neither Píláji nor Kántáji afforded any protection to Gujarát, but rather pillaged it, closed with the offers of Bájiráv Peshwa, and in 1729 formally granted to him the one-fourth and one-tenth shares of the revenue of the province. The Peshwa accordingly sent his brother Chimnájiráv to collect the tribute. Chimnáji plundered Dholka and the country near Chámpáner, while Mubáriz-ul-Mulk exacted tribute from the chiefs on the banks of the Vatrak River. Kántáji now entered Gujarát and prepared for war in case Chimnáji and the viceroy should unite against him. His movements were not interfered with, and after collecting his share of the tribute, he retired to Sorath. The viceroy now marched against the Kolis, and after destroying many of them together with their wives and children, returned to Áhmedábád by way of Modasa and Ahmednagar (Himatnagar). Ghulám Muhy-ud-dín Khán, governor of Junágaḍh, who had not yet proceeded to his command, appointed a second deputy. Through the influence of the viceroy this appointment was not confirmed, and instead Sher Khán Bábi, son of Salábat Muhammad Khán, was placed in charge of that fortress.

Mulla Muhammad Áli raises a Disturbance at Surat, 1729

In Surat, the year 1729, was marked by a severe flood in the Tapti River and by a somewhat serious local disturbance. The chief cause of the disturbance was Mulla Muhammad Áli, a rich Muslim trader of Surat. This man who, as Ûmda-tut-tujjár or chief of the merchants, had already a special rank in the city, was tempted to take advantage of the disorders of the time to raise himself to the position of an independent ruler. With this object, he chose as his headquarters the Piram Island in the Gulf of Cambay, near the port of Ghogha, and there spent considerable sums in strengthening the island and tempting settlers to place themselves under his protection. As Píram was not popular, Mulla Muhammad fixed on the village of Athwa, on the left bank of the Tápti, about twelve miles from its mouth. Here he began to build a fort, but was ordered to desist by Sohráb Khán, the governor of Surat, from which city the proposed stronghold was only three miles distant. Mulla Muhammad so far from obeying, persuaded Beglar-Beg Khán the commander of the fort of Surat to side with him. Accordingly, next day, Beglar-Beg Khán bombarded the governor Sohráb Khán's residence, proclaiming that his own brother Teghbeg Khán was appointed governor of Surat. In the end, Mulla Muhammad Áli induced the chief merchants of the city to pray for the removal of Sohráb who pending receipt of orders from the emperor was made to hand over his official residence in the city to Teghbeg Khán.

Naḍiád given in Farm, 1729.

In the same year, 1729, Jawán Mard Khán Bábi was chosen governor of Petlad, Áli Muhammad Khán was made collector of Áhmedábád, and Áli Muhammad's son, the author of the Mirăt-i-Áhmedi and his brother were appointed governor and superintendent of the customs of that district. Áli Muhammad Khán shortly resigned and was succeeded by Rú-ín Khán. At this time Jawán Mard Khán Bábi, while punishing the Kolis of Bálor, probably Bhátod about fifteen miles east of Bharuch, was killed by a man of that tribe, and in revenge for his death the town of Bálor was plundered. On the death of Jawán Mard Khán, at the request of Salábat Muhammad Khán Bábi, his eldest son Kamál-ud-dín Khán Bábi received the districts of Sami and Munjpur and the title of Jawán Mard Khán. At the same time the second son, Muhammad Anwar, with the title of Safdar Khán, was appointed to the government of Radhanpur. The viceroy now went to Naḍiád, where Rái Kishandás, agent of Jawán Mard Khán, received the district of Petlád in farm. From Naḍiád, Mubáriz-ul-Mulk went to collect tribute from Sarḍársingh, the chief of Bhadarva in the Rewa Kántha about fifteen miles north of Baroda, on the banks of the Mahi river, who, after some fighting, agreed to pay a sum of Rs. 20000. On his way back to Áhmedábád the viceroy levied tribute from the chief of Umeta, fifteen miles west of Baroda. As Rái Kishandás failed to pay the sum agreed on for the farm of Petlád, an order was issued for his imprisonment. To save himself from the indignity he committed suicide.

Athva Fort, 1730

When Kántáji returned from Sorath he camped at Sanand, and his advanced guard carried off some of the viceroy's elephants which were grazing there. Men were sent in pursuit, but in vain, and the Maráthás escaped. Meanwhile, at Surat, Mulla Muhammad Áli continued to build the fort at Athva. At last his accomplice, Beglar-Beg Khán the commander of the Surat fort, began to perceive that if the Athva fort were completed the Mulla would be in a position to obstruct the trade of the port of Surat. He consequently ordered him to stop building. In spite of this the Mulla succeeded in persuading Sohráb Khán to allow him to go on with his fort promising in return to get him confirmed as governor of Surat. Sohráb Khán agreed, and the fort was completed, and Sohráb Khán was duly appointed governor. As the fort was immediately below Surat the revenue of Surat was greatly diminished, and Sohráb Khán, when it was too late, saw his mistake.

The Viceroy in Káthiáváḍa and Kutch, 1730

In 1730, Mubáriz-ul-Mulk went into Gohilwad in south-east Kathiawad and levied tribute from Bhávsingh, chief of Sihor; then he proceeded to Mádhupur, a town under Porbandar, and laid it waste. While engaged at Mádhupur, Momín Khán, son-in-law of the late Momín Khán, owing to some misunderstanding with the viceroy suddenly set out for Áhmedábád and from Áhmedábád proceeded to Ágra. The viceroy now marched in the direction of Kutch and refusing the offer of a yearly tribute of about 10,00,000 mahmúdis, advanced against Bhuj. He experienced great difficulty in crossing the Rann of Kutch, and as the Ráo had cut off all supplies, and as at the same time news arrived of disturbances in Áhmedábád, he was obliged, after a month and a half, to retire to Rádhanpur.

Riots at Áhmedábád

The author of the Mirăt-i-Áhmedi was ordered to suppress the Áhmedábád riots, which had arisen out of the levy of some fresh taxes, and was invested with the title of Hasan Muhammad Khán. In this year Udaikaran, Desái of Víramgám, was murdered by a Kasbáti (Note: Kasbátis are the descendants of the Muslim garrisons of some towns of north Gujarát. The Kasbátis of Víramgám were originally Tánk Rájputs.) of that town named Áli, and Salábát Muhammad Khán Bábi, who was sent to investigate this murder, died on his way at Paldi, a village on the right bank of the Sábarmati opposite to Áhmedábád.

=== Mahárája Abheysingh, Fifty-third Viceroy, 1730–1733 ===
In 1730, Mahárája Abheysingh of Jodhpur was appointed viceroy and had reached Palanpur. The friends of order endeavoured to arrange a peaceable transfer between the Mahárája and the late viceroy, but Mubáriz-ul-Mulk determined to try the chances of war, and prepared for resistance. At this time Mír Ismáíl, deputy of Ghulám Muhy-ud-dín Khán, arrived and took charge of the government of Junágaḍh from Sher Khán Bábi. Mahárája Abheysingh, after making various appointments, set out with his brother Vakhatsingh and 20,000 men to take over the government of Gujarát. When he reached Pálanpur and saw that Mubáriz-ul-Mulk was determined on resistance, he sent an order to Sardár Muhammad Ghorni appointing him his minister and directing him to take possession of the city of Áhmedábád and drive out the late viceroy. As Sardár Muhammad was not strong enough to carry out these orders he awaited the Mahárája's arrival. When the Mahárája reached Sidhpur he was joined by Safdar Khán Bábi and Jawán Mard Khán Bábi from Radhanpur. They then advanced together to Adalaj, distant only about eight miles from Ahmedabad, their army increasing daily.

Battle of Adálaj (1730) and Mubáriz-ul-Mulk defeated

Mubáriz-ul-Mulk was already encamped between Adálaj and the city, and on the approach of the Mahárája a battle was fought in which the Mahárája was defeated. Abheysingh changed his position, and another and bloodier engagement took place, in which both sides tried to kill the opposing commander. But as both Mubáriz-ul-Mulk and the Mahárája fought disguised as common soldiers, neither party succeeded. At first the Mahárája who had the advantage in position repulsed the enemy, but Mubáriz-ul-Mulk fought so desperately in the river-bed that the Ráthoḍs gave way. They rallied and made one more desperate charge, but were met, repulsed, and finally pursued as far as Sarkhej. The Mahárája, who had not expected so determined an opposition, now sent Momín Khán and Amarsingh to negotiate with Mubáriz-ul-Mulk, who was still determined to resist to the uttermost. It was finally agreed that Mubáriz-ul-Mulk should receive a sum of 100,000 rupees and should surrender Áhmedábád to the Mahárája. Mubáriz-ul-Mulk accordingly quitted the city and left for Agra by way of Udaipur.

The Mahárája entering Áhmedábád, appointed Ratansingh Bhandári his deputy, and placed Fidá-ud-dín Khán, cousin of Momín Khán, in charge of the city police. Shortly afterwards Karímdád Khán Jhálori, governor of Pálanpur, who had accompanied the Mahárája into Gujarát, died. After the death of Salábat Muhammad Khán Bábi, his son, Sher Khán Bábi, was dismissed from the government of Junágaḍh. He retired to his estate of Ghogha, and when the Mahárája arrived in Áhmedábád he paid his respects, presenting the viceroy with an elephant and some horses. The Mahárája confirmed the lands assigned to his father, and reported his action to the emperor.

Momín Khán Ruler of Cambay, 1730

Momín Khán was made ruler of Cambay, and Fidá-ud-dín Khán, his cousin, was made governor of the lands near that city, the revenue of which had been assigned to the Mahárája. So great was the fear of the Maráthás, that Mustafíd Khán, the governor elect of Surat, instead of proceeding direct by land, went to Cambay. From Cambay he moved to Bharuch, and from Bharuch entered into negotiations with Píláji Gáikwár, promising, if allowed to retain possession of Surat, to pay Píláji the one-fourth share of its revenues. Píláji agreed, but Sohráb Khán, who was still in possession of Surat, refused to hand it over to Mustafíd Khán. In this year also Vakhatsingh, brother of the Mahárája Abheysingh, was appointed governor of Pátan, and sent a deputy to act for him. About the same time Mír Fakhr-ud-dín, a follower of the late viceroy Mubáriz-ul-Mulk, leaving him secretly, came to Áhmedábád, and in an interview with the Mahárája obtained for himself the post of deputy governor of Junágaḍh. When he proceeded to take up his appointment he was opposed by Mír Ismáíl, and was killed in a battle fought near Amreli. Muhammad Pahár, son of Karímdád Khán Jhálori, was appointed governor of Pálanpur in succession to his father, and Jawán Mard Khán was sent to Vadnagar.

The Peshwa and Viceroy against Piláji Gáikwár, 1731

In 1731, Bájiráv Peshwa, entering Gujarát at the head of an army, advanced against Baroda, then in the possession of Píláji Gáikwár. Afterwards, at the invitation of the Mahárája, he visited Áhmedábád and had a meeting with the viceroy in the Sháhi Bágh. At this meeting it was agreed that Bájiráv should assist Ázmatulláh, the governor of Baroda, in taking possession of that town and in expelling Píláji Gáikwár. By this arrangement the viceroy hoped by playing off the Peshwa against Píláji, to succeed in getting rid of the latter, while the Peshwa intended that if Píláji was forced to give up Baroda, he himself should gain possession of that city. Accordingly, the Peshwa, together with an army from the viceroy, marched on Baroda. They had scarcely laid siege to the city when the Peshwa heard that Nizám-ul-Mulk was advancing on Gujarát against him. Abandoning all operations against Baroda, the Peshwa withdrew, with all speed, to the Dakhan. On his way he encountered the army of Trimbakráv Senápati, who, together with Piláji Kántáji and Udáji Pavár, had united to resist the pretensions of the Peshwa in Gujarát, and were also secretly leagued with the Nizám.

An engagement was fought in which the Peshwa was victorious and Trimbakráv was slain. The Peshwa at once pushed on to the Dakhan, contriving to avoid the Nizám, though his baggage was plundered by that chief, who had camped at Ghala Kamrej, on the river Tápti, about ten miles above Surat.

Abdúlláh Beg appointed the Nizám's Deputy at Broach. During these changes the city of Bharuch, which on account of the strength of its fort the Maráthás had failed to take, was governed by Abdúlláh Beg, an officer originally appointed to that command by Mubáriz-ul-Mulk. Dissatisfied that the government of Gujarát should be in the hands of Abheysingh, Abdúlláh Beg, in 1731, entered into negotiations with the Nizám, offering to hold Bharuch as the Nizám's deputy. Nizám-ul-Mulk agreed, appointed Abdúlláh his deputy, and ennobled him with the title of Nek Álam Khán. About the same time Vakhatsingh, brother of the viceroy, withdrew to his chiefship of Nágor in Jodhpur, and Ázmat-ulláh went to Ágra. After his safe arrival in the Dakhan Bájiráv Peshwa entered into an agreement with the Nizám under the terms of which the grants of Dholka, Bharuch, Jambusar, and Makbúlábád were continued to the Nizám. Momín Khán received the farm of Petlad, and Kántáji was confirmed in the share he had acquired of the revenues of Gujarát. In 1732 the paymaster, Amánatdár Khán, died, and was succeeded by Ghulám Hasan Khán, who sent Mujáhid-ud-dín Khán to act as his deputy. Through the influence of Mulla Muhammad Ali, Sohráb Áli was now confirmed as governor of Surat, and Mustafíd Khán was obliged to return to Áhmedábád.

Píláji Gáikwár as the agent of the deceased Khanderáv Dábháde Senápati, as the owner of the fort of Songad, and as the ally of the Bhíls and Kolis, was naturally a thorn in the side of the viceroy Abheysingh. The recent acquisition of the town of Baroda and of the strong fortress of Dabhoi had made Piláji still more formidable. Under these circumstances, Abheysingh, who had long wished to recover Baroda and Dabhoi determined to assassinate Piláji, and this was effected by a Márvádi at the village of Dakor. The Maráthás slew the assassin and withdrew across the Mahi, burning the body of Piláji at the village of Savli, fourteen miles north of Baroda. They then evacuated the district of Baroda, retiring to the fortress of Dabhoi. On hearing of the death of Píláji, the viceroy immediately advanced against the Maráthás, and, after taking possession of Baroda, laid siege to Dabhoi. He failed to capture this fortress, and as the rainy season had set in and provisions were scarce, he was obliged to retire. He then went to Baroda, and after placing Sher Khán Bábi in charge of the city, returned to Áhmedábád. In 1732, Gujarát was wasted by famine.

Affairs at Surat, 1732.

Meanwhile, at Surat Múlla Muhammad Ali of Athva was again the cause of disturbance. Resisting with force the demand of a sum of 100,000 rupees by Sohráb Khán, the governor of Surat, he succeeded in driving Sohráb Khán out of the city, and the government of Surat was then usurped by Teghbeg Khán, a brother of Beglar-Beg Khán. The success of the Múlla against Soráb Khán made him so forgetful of his position that he arrogated to himself all the emblems of the governor's office and wrote to the emperor asking a patent of the governorship of Surat in the name of his son Múlla Fakhr-ud-dín. The messengers bearing these communications were intercepted at Broach by the partisans of Teghbeg, who determined to remove this powerful cause of anxiety. Teghbeg Khán, inviting Muhammad Ali to an entertainment, placed him in confinement, and after keeping him in prison for two years, in 1734 put him to death. Teghbeg also took possession of the fort of Athva, and plundered it. Sohráb Khán, seeing that he could not recover Surat, went with Sayad Wali to Ghogha, where his relatives lived, and from that, proceeding to Bhavnagar settled there. When the emperor heard what had happened, he appointed Momín Khán to Surat and Teghbeg Khán to Cambay. Momín Khán sent Sayad Núrullah to act for him, but he was defeated by Teghbeg Khán, who afterwards contrived, in 1733, to be formally appointed governor of Surat with the title of Bahádur.

When Umábái, widow of Khanderáv Senápati, heard of the assassination of Píláji Gáikwár, she determined to avenge his death. Collecting an army and taking with her Kántáji Kadam and Dámáji Gáikwár, son of Píláji, she marched upon Áhmedábád. As the Maráthás failed to do more than slay a Rájput leader named Jívaráj they came to terms. In the end it was agreed that in addition to the one-fourth and the one-tenth shares of the revenue a sum of rupees 80,000 should be paid from the Áhmedábád treasury, Jawán Mard Khán being kept as a hostage till the payments were made. For his services on this occasion Jawán Mard Khán was made governor of Viramgam. During this year an imperial order appointed Khushálchand Sheth, son of Shantidas Jhaveri, Nagar Sheth or chief merchant of Áhmedábád. The Maráthás plundered Rasúlábád a mile south of Áhmedábád and its excellent library was pillaged. Umábái now marched upon Baroda, and the governor, Sher Khán Bábi, prepared to oppose the Maráthás. But Umábái, sending a message to Sher Khán, explained that she had just concluded a peace with the Mahárája, and was suffered to pass unmolested. The emperor, satisfied with the arrangements made by the Mahárája, presented him with a dress of honour.

=== Ratansingh Bhandári, Deputy Viceroy, 1733–1737 ===
In this year the Mahárája went to court by way of Jodhpur, and appointed Ratansingh Bhandári as his deputy, and the author of the Mirăt-i-Áhmedi as news recorder. In 1733, Ghulám Muhy-ud-dín Khán, governor of Junágaḍh died, and his son Mír Hazabr Khán was selected to fill his place.

Meanwhile, as the Maráthás had not received their rights, Jádoji Dábháde, son of Umábái, returned to Gujarát. Peace was concluded on the former basis, and Jádoji marched into Sorath to exact tribute. In this year the Kolis of the Chúnvál and Kánkrej committed many excesses, and a Rájput noble was robbed in the Pátan district. In the meantime Sohráb Khán, the former governor of Surat, who had been kindly received by Bhávsinghji, the chief of Sihor, began to raise a following and was appointed collector of arrears in Sorath. He chose Sayad Núrullah as his deputy, and sent him to recover the revenue for the current year.

On the death of Salábat Khán Bábi, though the Mahárája had endeavoured to get Sher Khán Bábi appointed in place of his father, Ghogha had been granted to Burhán-ul-Mulk, who chose Sohráb Khán as his deputy. At this time Sher Khán Bábi was at Baroda, and his younger brother, though he resisted, was compelled to leave Ghogha. The deputy governor of Sorath complained to the governor of the oppressive conduct of Sohráb Khán. But Burhán-ul-Mulk supported Sohráb and having obtained for himself the government of Sorath, sent Sohráb Khán as his deputy to Junágaḍh. In 1734, Ratansingh Bhandári, the deputy viceroy, ordered Bhávsingh, son of Udaikaran, the hereditary officer of Víramgám, to be captured by Jawán-Mard Khán, imprisoned and sent him to Áhmedábád. Jawan-Mard Khán went so far as to arrest Bhávsingh, but was forced by his supporters to release him.

Baroda recovered by the Maráthás, 1734

In 1734, Sher Khán Bábi, governor of Baroda, went to visit his lands at Balasinor, leaving Muhammad Sarbáz in command at Baroda, Máhadáji Gáikwár, brother of Píláji, who then held Jambúsar, sending to Songad to Dámáji for aid, marched on Baroda with a strong force. The garrison made a brave defence, and Sher Khán hearing of the attack at Bálásinor, called for aid from Ratansingh Bhandári, the deputy viceroy, who directed Momín Khán, the governor of Cambay, to join Sher Khán and drive back the Maráthás. Sher Khán started at once for Baroda. But Máhadaji leaving a sufficient force before the town pushed on with the bulk of his army to meet Sher Khán, and, though he and his men fought bravely, defeated him, and then returned to Baroda, Sher Khán retiring to Bálásinor. Momín Khán, who arrived after Sher Khán's defeat, did not deem it prudent to engage the Maráthás, and retired to Cambay. In the meantime the garrison of Baroda, hopeless of succour, surrendered the town, and since that day Baroda continued to be the headquarters of the Gáikwár family until independence of India in 1947.

Since Jawán Mard Khán's capture of Bhávsingh of Víramgám, he had become much disliked. For this reason Ratansingh Bhandári, the deputy viceroy, transferred him to Kadi and Vijapur, and in his place appointed Sher Khán Bábi, whose father Muhammad Salábát Khán Bábi had been a popular governor of Víramgám. At this time Dhanrúp Bhandári, governor of Petlád, died, and the farm of the districts of Nadiad, Arhar-Mátar, Petlád, and Mahudha was given to Momín Khán. Mulla Muhammad Áli managed to write letters from his confinement at Surat to the Nizám; and as that chief was now not far from Surat, he wrote urgently to Teghbeg Khán to release him. Teghbeg Khán put the Mulla to death, and bribing the Nizám's messenger, gave out that he had died of joy at his release. Khushálchand, the chief of the merchants of Áhmedábád, having had a difference with Ratansingh, was forced to leave the city, and sought shelter at Cambay and afterwards at Junágaḍh.

Jawán Mard Khán conceived the design of conquering Idar from Anandsingh and Ráisingh, brothers of the Mahárája Abheysingh. He accordingly marched upon Ídar, taking with him as allies Aghráji Koli of Katosan and Koli Amra of Ilol Kánrah. In this strait Anandsingh and Ráisingh sought the aid of Malhárráv Holkar and Ránoji Sindia, who were at this time in Málwa. The Marátha chiefs at once marched to the help of Ídar, and Jawán Mard Khán, disbelieving the report of Marátha aid, continued to advance until he found himself opposed by an overwhelming force. Negotiations were entered into, and Jawán Mard Khán agreed to pay a sum of Rupees 1,75,000. Of the total amount Rupees 25,000 were paid at once, and Zoráwar Khán, brother of Jawán Mard Khán, and Ajabsingh, agent of Aghráji Koli, were kept as hostages until the balance should be paid. In this year Teghbeg Khán of Surat caused a wealthy merchant named Áhmed Chalabi to be assassinated, and confiscated his property. He also ordered Sayad Áli to be put to death by certain Afgháns.

Rivalry of Ratansingh Bhandári and Sohráb Khán, 1735

In 1735, Dholka was assigned to Ratansingh Bhandári, and through the influence of Burhán-ul-Mulk, Sohráb Khán was appointed governor of Víramgám. Ratansingh resented this, and eventually Víramgám was conferred on the Mahárája Abheysingh. When this order reached Sohráb Khán, he forwarded it to Burhán-ul-Mulk, and in consequence of Burhán-ul-Mulk's remonstrances, the arrangements were changed and Sohráb Khán appointed governor. Upon this Sohráb Khán, leaving Sádak Ali as his deputy in Junágaḍh, marched for Víramgám; while Ratansingh Bhandári, hearing of Sohráb Khán's approach, summoned Momín Khán and others to his assistance, and with his own army proceeded to Dholka and plundered Koth. From Koth he advanced and pitched at Harala, about ten miles from Sohráb Khán's camp, and here he was joined by Momín Khán and others whom he had summoned to support him.

Battle of Dholi. Defeat and Death of Sohráb Khán, 1735

After the union of these forces he marched to Dholi, six miles from Dhandhuka, at which place Sohráb Khán was then encamped. Ratansingh Bhandári now proposed that peace should be concluded, and that Sohráb Khán should enjoy Víramgám until final orders were passed by the emperor. Safdar Khán Bábi and others went to Sohráb Khán and endeavoured to bring him to consent to these terms; but he would not listen, and on both sides preparations were made for battle. During the following night Ratansingh Bhandári planned an attack on Sohráb Khán's camp. The surprise was complete. Sohráb Khán's troops fled, and himself, mortally wounded, shortly afterwards died. By the death of Sohráb Khán the family of Kázím Beg Khán became extinct. He was buried at Sihor in Kathiwar.

Rivalry between Ratansingh Bhandári and Momín Khán, 1735

After this success a single horseman attacked and wounded Ratansingh Bhandári in two places. The horseman was at once slain, but no one was able to recognize him. Ratansingh, who in two months had recovered from his injuries, now determined to attack Momín Khán, as that officer in the recent struggle had taken part with Sohráb Khán. Momín Khán hearing of Ratansingh's intentions, withdrew to Cambay. In the course of this year, on the expiry of the period of the farm of Mahudha, Arhar-Mátar, and Naḍiád, these districts were transferred from Momín Khán to Safdar Khán Bábi. Kaliánchand, was appointed to Víramgám in place of Sher Khán Bábi, and instead of Sohráb Khán, Muhsin Khán Khálvi was made deputy governor of Sorath.

Battle of Ánand-Mogri, 1735.

About this time Dámáji Gáikwár, who had been chosen by Umábái as her representative in Gujarát, appointed Rangoji to act as his agent. Kántáji being dissatisfied with this arrangement, in which his rights were ignored, marched into Gujarát. Rangoji met him, and a battle was fought at Ánand-Mogri, twenty-five miles south-east of Kheda, in which Kántáji was defeated and his son killed. In consequence of this reverse Kántáji retired to Petlád. Momín Khán, who with his army was drawn up near Petlád to oppose Rangoji, was compelled to retire to Cambay, where peace was concluded on condition that Dámáji should receive the one-fourth share of the revenues of the country north of the Mahi. As the districts where these battles were fought were held in farm by Safdar Khán Bábi, he suffered much loss, and consequently retired to Rádhanpur. Rangoji was joined by Dámáji Gáikwár, and these two leaders went together to Dholka.

While they were there, Bhávsingh of Víramgám invited them to that town, both on account of the annoyance he suffered from the Márvádis and that he might take vengeance on the Kasbátis for the murder of his father Udaikaran. He accordingly admitted the Maráthás and slew Daulat Muhammad Tánk, brother of the murderer of his father, and expelled the rest of the Kasbátis, while Kalián, the Márvádi administrator, was permitted to go to Áhmedábád. Leaving Rangoji at Víramgám, Dámáji marched into Sorath to levy tribute from the chiefs, and after collecting a portion of his dues, returned to the Dakhan. In the following year (1736) Rangoji advanced as far as Bavla near Dholka wasting the country. Ratansingh Bhandári, the deputy viceroy, marched against him, and forced him to retire to Víramgám. Ratansingh pursued the Maráthás to Víramgám, attacked and defeated them capturing their baggage, but failed to prevent them taking shelter in the town. About this time some Marátha horse who were at Sarnál, otherwise called Thásra, joined the Kolis of those parts, advanced with them against Kapadvanj and without any serious resistance succeeded in capturing the town. Meanwhile, though Ratansingh had summoned Momín Khán to his aid, he delayed coming, as he began to scheme independence at Cambay.

Ratansingh Bhandári heard that Pratápráv, brother of Dámáji, and Deváji Tákpar were advancing on Áhmedábád with 10,000 horse. At first he thought this a device to draw him from Víramgám, to whose walls his mines had reached. On ascertaining from trusty spies that the report was true, he raised the siege of Víramgám, returned rapidly to Áhmedábád, and pushing forward to meet Pratápráv, exacted tribute from the chiefs on the banks of the Vátrak. As Pratápráv drew near, the governor of the Bhíl district retired before him, and he continuing his advance, passed through Valad and Pethapur, and so by way of Chhála reached Dholka. Here, through Muhammad Ismáíl, the governor of Dholka, he demanded from the Bhandári his share of the revenue. Afterwards, leaving 2000 horse in Dholka, he went to Dhandhúka. In the meantime Kántáji, who was a follower of Bájiráv Peshwa, joining with Malhárráv Holkar, advanced upon Ídar, and coming against Dánta, plundered that town. Some Nágar Bráhmans of the town of Vadnagar, who were settled in Dánta, tried to escape to the hills, but were intercepted and pillaged. The Maráthás then proceeded to Vadnagar and plundered the town. From Vadnagar they went as far as Pálanpur, where Pahár Khán Jhálori, being unable to oppose them, agreed to pay a tribute of 100,000 rupees. Kántáji and Malhárráv Holkar then marched into Márwár, while Pratápráv and Rangoji crossed over from Dhandhuka into Káthiáváḍa and Gohilváḍa. About this time Muhammad Pahár Khán Jhálori was appointed deputy governor of Pátan on behalf of Vakhatsingh. As no settlement of his demands on the revenues of Dholka had yet been made, Pratápráv returned to that town and sent Narhar Pandit to receive the tribute due to him. Afterwards proceeding to Baroda with Rangoji they were summoned to Sorath by Dámáji to assist him. Sher Khán Bábi, who up to his time had been at Kaira, now came to Áhmedábád, and as the deputy viceroy was displeased with Momín Khán's conduct when Víramgám was besieged, he appointed Sher Khán his own deputy at Petlád, Arhar-Mátar, and Naḍiád. Afterwards on Momín Khán's remonstrance Subháchand Márvádi was appointed to examine the accounts and receive the revenue in place of Sher Khán. In 1737 Dámáji's brother Pratápráv, returning to his country after exacting tribute from the chiefs of Sorath, died of smallpox at Kánkar near Dholka. Momín Khán seeing that Sher Khán had not yet left Kaira, collected some men and came to Petlád, while Sher Khán went to Dehgam and awaited the departure of Rangoji. Ratansingh Bhandári made preparations to help Sher Khán and Momín Khán returned to Cambay.

=== Momín Khán, Fifty-fourth Viceroy, 1737 ===
At this time as the Mahárája Abheysingh was not in favour at court, Momín Khán was appointed fifty-fourth viceroy. As he was unable to effect anything by himself he persuaded Jawán Mard Khán Bábi to join him by a promise of the government of Pátan and directed him to proceed and take up that appointment. Now the Jháloris were allies of the Ráthoḍs, and Pahár Khán Jhálori, then in command of Pátan, opposed Jawán Mard Khán, but was finally obliged to vacate Pátan. Momín Khán, who had not hitherto produced the order appointing him viceroy, now made it public and began to act as viceroy with the title of Najm-ud-dauláh Momín Khán Bahádur Fírúz Jang, and in 1737 sent a copy of this order to Abdúl Husain Khán, the deputy minister, and to Mustafíd Khán, who held the office of Kázi. Sher Khán Bábi, wishing to remain neutral, retired to Bálásinor and Momín Khán summoned Rangoji, who was in the neighbourhood of Cambay, to his assistance.

Rangoji agreed to aid him in expelling the Márvádis, on condition that, if successful, he should be granted one-half of the produce of Gujarát except the city of Áhmedábád, the lands in the neighbourhood of the city, and the port of Cambay. This alliance with the Maráthás gave the last blow to Mughal power in Gujarát, which otherwise might have lingered for at least a quarter of a century.

When Ratansingh Bhandári heard of the appointment of Momín Khán to be viceroy, he wrote to Mahárája Abheysingh for orders. Meanwhile, he sent officials to Cambay to persuade Momín Khán to take no further steps until a reply should be received to the reference Momín Khán had made to Ágra. The reply of the Mahárája was that Ratansingh should resist Momín Khán if he could. Ratansingh prepared to defend Áhmedábád while Momín Khán collecting an army, camped at the Náransar lake.

Siege of Ahmedabad

From the Náransar lake where Momín Khán remained encamped for one and a half months collecting his partisans he advanced to Sojitra, where he was joined by Jawán Mard Khán Bábi; and proceeding together they came to Vasu under Petlád, about twenty-six miles from Áhmedábád, and from Vasu to Kaira, about eighteen miles from the capital. At Kaira they encamped on the banks of the Vátrak, where, owing to the incessant rain, they were forced to remain for about a month. When the rain abated and the rivers were fordable, Momín Khán, moving to Áhmedábád, encamped in front of the city on the Kánkariya tank and prepared for a siege. About the same time Momín Khán's manager, Vajerám, whom he had sent to Songad to solicit Dámáji to march in person to his assistance, arrived and informed him that Dámáji would join him shortly. Zoráwar Khán, who had been left at the Marátha camp as security for the payment of the tribute, was recalled, and instead the district of Prantij was formally assigned to the Maráthás in payment of their demands. Some of the Mahárája's guns, which were being sent to Áhmedábád by his agents at Surat through Cambay for facility of transit, were about this time captured by a party of Momín Khán's men. When Ratansingh Bhandári wrote to the Mahárája of Momín Khán's advance on Áhmedábád, the Mahárája was much displeased, and went from the emperor's presence in anger. The nobles fearing the consequences, recalled him, and persuaded the emperor to re-appoint him viceroy of Gujarát.

=== Mahárája Abheysingh, Fifty-fifth Viceroy, 1737 ===
Momín Khán continues the Siege of Áhmedábád

Momín Khán was secretly enjoined to disregard the Mahárája's appointment and persevere in expelling the Ráthoḍs of Marwar, and was assured of the emperor's approbation of this line of conduct. He therefore continued to prosecute the siege with vigour. In the meantime another order was received from the imperial court, confirming the reappointment of the Mahárája and appointing Fidá-ud-dín Khán to guard the city with 500 men, directing also that Momín Khán should return to Cambay. It was further stated that, as Ratansingh Bhandári had acted oppressively, some other person should be appointed deputy to fill his place, and that in the meantime a Rájput noble, named Abhaikaran, was to carry on the government. Shortly before this Muhammad Bákir Khán, son of Muâtamid Khán, joined Momín Khán from Surat, while Sádik Áli Khán and his nephew reinforced him from Junágaḍh. When Momín Khán was informed of the purport of the imperial order he agreed to return to Cambay, provided Ratansingh Bhandári would quit the city, hand over charge to Abhaikaran, and admit Fidá-ud-dín Khán and his men into the city.

Ratansingh Bhandári determined not to leave the city, and prepared to defend himself to the last. Dámáji Gáikwár now joined Momín Khán from Songad. Momín Khán met Dámáji at Isanpur, three miles from Áhmedábád, and made great show of friendship, calling him his brother. When Ratansingh Bhandári heard of the arrangements made between Dámáji and Momín Khán, he sent a message to Dámáji saying, 'Momín Khán has promised Rangoji half of the revenues of Gujarát excepting the city of Áhmedábád, the lands immediately round it, and Cambay. If you will join me, I will give you half of everything not excepting the city nor Cambay, and will send to your camp some of my chief landholders as security if you agree.' Dámáji showed this to Momín Khán, and asked him what he proposed to do. Momín Khán now perforce agreed to do the same; but instead of Cambay offered to make over to the Maráthás the whole district of Víramgám. Dámáji, accepting these terms, ceased to negotiate with Ratansingh. He then went on pilgrimage to Dudesar, and returning in the same year, 1738, he and Rangoji began active operations against Áhmedábád. Their bombardment did so much damage to the city that Momín Khán repented having called them to his aid, and foresaw that if the Maráthás once gained any portion of the city it would be no easy matter to drive them out. Momín Khán now sent the writer of the Mirăt-i-Áhmedi to Ratansingh Bhandári, in hopes that he might withdraw peaceably, but Ratansingh refused to listen to any terms. After some time the people under Kázim Áli Khán and others, and the Maráthás under Báburáv endeavoured to take the city by storm, but after a bloody contest were forced to retire. Next day Ratansingh, seeing that he could not long hold the city, entered into a negotiation with Momín Khán, and, on receiving a sum of money for his expenses, and on being allowed to retire with the honours of war, left the city.

Momín Khán entered Áhmedábád

On the capture of the city, in accordance with Momín Khán's engagement, half of it was handed to the Maráthás. Momín Khán sent news of what had taken place to the emperor, and appointed Fidá-ud-dín Khán his deputy. Dámáji, who in the meantime had been to Sorath, now returned and was met by Rangoji, who accompanied him as far as the banks of the Mahi, whence Rangoji proceeded to Dholka. After spending a few days at Dholka, Rangoji returned to Áhmedábád and took charge of his share of the city, which comprised the Raikhad, Khánjchán, and Jamalpur quarters as far as the Astoria and Ráipur gates. The city was thus equally divided, and the Astodia and Raipur gates were guarded by the Maráthás. At that time the inhabitants of Áhmedábád rose against the strangers, and after a severe affray expelled the greater part of them from the city. Momín Khán, though secretly pleased, affected ignorance and sent Fidá-ud-dín Khán to reassure Rangoji. This with some difficulty he succeeded in doing and Rangoji remained in the city. Jawán Mard Khán was sent to Pátan, and, instead of Prántij, the district of Kheralu was granted to Zoráwar Khán Bábi.

=== Momín Khán, Fifth-sixth Viceroy, 1738–1743 ===
With the cessation of Marátha oppression, Áhmedábád began to recover its splendour and opulence. The emperor was much pleased with Momín Khán, and, raising his rank, presented him with a dress of honour, a sword, and other articles of value. At the close of the rainy season Momín Khán went to levy tribute from the chiefs on the banks of the Sabarmati, and Rangoji was asked to accompany him. They marched to Adalaj whence Fidá-ud-dín Khán, the deputy viceroy, returned to the city accompanied by Rámáji as deputy of Rangoji. Jawán Mard Khán and Sher Khán Bábi now joined the viceroy's camp, and, about the same time Hathising, chief of Pethápur, paid a visit to the viceroy and settled his tribute. From Adálaj they advanced to Mansa and were met by the Mánsa chief. From Mánsa they proceeded to Kadi, and from Kadi to Víjápur. After Momín Khán left the people of Áhmedábád were badly treated, and Rangoji, leaving his brother Akoji in camp, returned to the capital, whence he marched towards Víramgám and Sorath. Momín Khán went from Víjápur to Ídar, and there levied tribute from the chiefs of Mohanpur and Ranásan.

The Viceroy collects Tribute, 1738

When Momín Khán arrived at Ídar, Ánandsingh and Ráisingh, brothers of Mahárája Abheysingh, went to him and paid the tribute of Mohanpur and Ranásan as being within the limits of the Ídar territory. The matter was amicably settled, and the two brothers accompanied the viceroy as far as the Ídar frontier, when Ánandsingh returned to Ídar, and Ráisingh, at Momín Khán's request, remained with him, Momín Khán undertaking to pay the expenses of his men. Prathiráj, the chief of Mánsa, agreed to pay Rupees 23,000 and the chief of Varsoda Rupees 10,000 as tribute. At this time Sher Muhammad Khán Bábi was appointed to succeed Mír Dost Áli as deputy governor of Sorath. The Maráthás, who had attempted to deprive some of the Rasúlábád and Batwa Sayads of their land, were attacked by the Muslim population, and a few men were wounded on either side. Momín Khán, receiving tribute from various chiefs, had now reached Palanpur, and Pahár Khán Jhálori, the governor of that place, was introduced to the viceroy by Sher Khán Bábi. As news was now received that Deváji Tákpar was advancing through the Baroda districts, Momín Khán marched towards Áhmedábád, dismissing Pahár Khán Jhálori on the Pálanpur frontier. Jawán Mard Khán Bábi, appointing his brother Safdar Khán Bábi as his deputy at Pátan, pushed forward in advance for Áhmedábád. Mámúr Khán, who had been chosen by Mír Huzabr Áli as his deputy in Sorath, now arrived and complained to Momín Khán regarding Sher Khán Bábi's appointment. Momín Khán said that, as neither had assumed charge of their duties, they should await final orders from the emperor. He then advanced to Hájipur, and thence encamped on the side of the city near Bahrámpur and occupied himself in strengthening the city defences. From that camp he proceeded to Ísanpur four miles south of Áhmedábád on his way to levy tribute from the Koli chiefs of the banks of the Vátrak. After this he proceeded to Kulej on the Vátrak and levied tribute from the Koli chiefs of that neighbourhood. Hearing that Dámáji had left Songad, and crossing the Mahi had gone to Arás, Momín Khán struck his camp and returned to the city, while Dámáji going to Dholka marched from that to Sorath. Momín Khán now permitted Sher Khán to return to his lands in Ghogha, whence he proceeded to Junágaḍh and took charge of the office of deputy governor.

Sher Khán Bábi Deputy Governor of Sorath, 1738

In 1738, Mír Huzabr Khán, the governor of Sorath, died, and as Sher Khán had occupied Junágaḍh, and taken into his employ all the troops of Mir Dost Áli, Mámúr Khán was obliged to resign his pretensions and return. The emperor now appointed Himmat Áli Khán, nephew of Momín Khán, governor of Sorath, and he wrote to his uncle to choose a fitting deputy. Momín Khán, as the Marátha incursions into Sorath increased yearly, and as Sher Khán Bábi was a man able to hold his own with them, suffered him to remain as deputy. When Dámáji returned to Víramgám, after levying tribute from the chiefs of Sorath, he was obliged to march against Kánji Koli, the chief of Chhaniár in the Chúnvál. As he could not prevail against them he was forced to call on Momín Khán for aid. Momín Khán sent Fidá-ud-dín Khán at the head of a well-equipped army. On their approach the Kolis fled, and the village was burned, and Fidá-ud-dín Khán returned to the capital. Dámáji, leaving Rangoji as his deputy, returned to Songad.

In 1738, Mughal Empire was invaded by the Persian Emperor Nádir Sháh, Delhi sacked, and the emperor Muhammad Shah made prisoner. Except that coin was struck in Nádir's name, the collapse of Mughal power caused little change in Gujarát.

The Deputy Viceroy collects Tribute, 1739

In 1739 Fidá-ud-dín Khán was sent to levy tribute from the chiefs on the banks of the Sábarmati, and, accompanied by Jawán Mard Khán Bábi and Rája Ráisingh of Ídar, marched to Charárah. As the village of Pánmul under Vijápur had been assigned to the author of the Mirăt-i-Áhmedi, he accompanied Fidá-ud-dín Khán, who marched to Ahmednagar, and demanded tribute from Jítsingh of Mohanpur and Ranásan. Jítsingh resisted and a doubtful battle was fought. Next day Fidá-ud-dín Khán changed his position and again attacked Jítsingh, who being defeated agreed to pay Rupees 10,000. They then went to Ídar, where they were hospitably received by Rája Ráising, who presented the leaders with horses. From Ídar they proceeded to Vadnagar, which was under Jawán Mard Khán, who also received them courteously and presented horses. The army then marched to Visalnagar. On the arrival of the troops at Visalnagar, Jawán Mard Khán requested Fidá-ud-dín Khán to subdue Jámáji the Koli chief of Thara-Jámpur in the Kánkrej, who was then at Balisana under Pátan and who was continually plundering the country. Fidá-ud-dín Khán marched to Bálísána, but Jámáji fled to Thara-Jámpur without risking a battle and the Mughal troops plundered Thara-Jámpur. From Bálísána Fidá-ud-dín marched to Kadi, and allowing Jawán Mard Khán to return to Pátan proceeded to Áhmedábád.

At Áhmedábád disputes between Rangoji and Momín Khán regarding the government of the city were frequent. In one serious disturbance Momín Khán was worsted and forced to sue for peace and grant Rangoji his half share both in the government and revenue, which, since the affray in 1738, Momín Khán had withheld. A formal agreement was drawn up but did not long remain in force. About this time Momín Khán's nephew Muhammad Momín Khán Bakhshi received a patent granting him the title of Nazar Áli Khán. In 1739, there was a disastrous flood in the Sábarmati.

Capture of Bassein by the Maráthás, 1739

In 1739, the Maráthás under Chimnáji Ápa successfully captured the fort of Vasai (Bassein) from the Portuguese following the Battle of Vasai.

In 1740, on his return from Sorath, Dámáji Gáikwár took Rangoji to the Dakhan and appointed Malhárráv Khúni his deputy at Áhmedábád. Fidá-ud-dín Khán met the new deputy at Ísanpur and escorted him to the city. Shortly after Fidá-ud-dín Khán and Nazar Áli Khán started to collect tribute, and Jawán Mard Khán sent his brother Zoráwar Khán Bábi to accompany them. They advanced against Dabhoda under Bahyal eighteen miles east of Áhmedábád in the Bhíl district and fought with the chief, who agreed to pay tribute. Then they went to Atarsumba, where the Kolis after a vain attempt to carry off their cannon agreed to pay tribute. The force then proceeded to Mándva and levied a contribution from the Mandva chief. They next went to Kapadvanj, and passing through Bálásinor reached Virpur under Lunáváḍa. Here, from Sultánsingh, agent of the Lunavada chief, they received two horses and Rupees 3000 as tribute. While at Lunáváḍa an order of recall came from Momín Khán, who intimated that Malhárráv Khúni had laid up large stores of grain and contemplated war. Fidá-ud-dín Khán at once pushed forward through Bálásinor and Kapadvanj, advancing rapidly towards the capital. On the way he received a second despatch from Momín Khán saying that, as the risk of war had for the present passed, they should advance to Petlád, where they would find Malhárráv Khúni and settle with him about the revenue accounts. They continued their march, and in two days reached Kaira (Kheda), being joined on the way by Muhammad Kúli Khán, who was charged with messages from Momín Khán. At Kaira they found Muhammad Husain, nephew of Fidá-ud-dín Khán who had been sent with a force to Mahudha. As Malhárráv Khúni was at Pinj near Kaira, Fidá-ud-dín Khán expressed a wish to meet him, and it was agreed that both sides should go to the Petlád district and there settle the disputed collections. Shortly after they met and arrangements were in progress when the Kolis of the Bhíl district rebelled and Abdúl Husain Khán and Vajerám were sent against them. After burning two or three villages this detachment rejoined the main body, and not long after all returned to Áhmedábád. During 1740, Bájiráv Peshwa died.

In 1741, Momín Khán went to Cambay, and while residing at Ghiáspur near that city received information that Dámáji had again appointed Rangoji his deputy in place of Malhárráv Khúni, and shortly after Rangoji arrived at Petlád. At this time Momín Khán turned his attention to the falling off in the customs revenue of Cambay and appointed Ismáil Muhammad collector of customs. As he was anxious to clear some misunderstanding between Rangoji and himself, Momín Khán set out to visit Rangoji and assure him of his good wishes. At this time Bhavsingh of Viramgam, who found the Maráthás even more troublesome than the Mughals, as soon as he heard of Malhárráv's recall, suddenly attacked the fort of Víramgám and with the aid of some Arabs and Rohillas expelled the Marátha garrison and prepared to hold the fort on his own account. Shortly after Rangoji demanded that a tower in Áhmedábád, which had been raised a story by Momín Khán so as to command the residence of the Marátha deputy at the Jamálpur gate, should be reduced to its original height. At the same time he suggested that Momín Khán and he, uniting their forces, should advance and expel Bhávsingh from Víramgám. Momín Khán agreed to both proposals. The addition to the tower was pulled down, and Momín Khán and Rangoji, marching against Víramgám, laid siege to the town. Bhávsingh made a gallant defence, and Momín Khán, who was not sorry to see the Maráthás in difficulties, after a time left them and marched to Kadi and Vijápur to levy tribute. Rangoji continued the siege, and as Bhávsingh saw that even without Momín Khán the Marátha army was sufficient to reduce the place, he agreed to surrender Víramgám, provided the fort of Patdi and its dependent villages were granted to him. Rangoji agreed, and thus the Maráthás again obtained possession of Víramgám, while Bhávsingh acquired Pátdi, a property which his descendants hold until independence of India.

When Momín Khán arrived at Mansa, about twenty-six miles north-west of Áhmedábád, hearing that Dámáji had crossed the Mahi with 10,000 men, he at once returned to the capital. Dámáji arrived at Mánsa and besieged it. The chiefs and Kolis defended the place bravely for about a month, when it fell into Dámáji's hands, who not only cleared the prickly-pear stockade which surrounded it, but also burned the town. From Mánsa, Dámáji marched to Sorath. On his return he laid siege to Bharuch, a fort which, from its natural strength as well as from its favourable position on the Narmada, it had been the constant ambition both of Dámáji and of his father Píláji to capture. On the approach of Dámáji, Nek Álam Khán, who held the place in the interests of the Nizám, prepared to defend the fort, and wrote to the Nizám for aid. In reply the Nizám warned Dámáji not to attack his possessions. On receiving this letter Dámáji raised the siege and returned to Songad. It seems probable that concessions were made to tempt Dámáji to retire from Bharuch, and that the Gáikwár's share in the Bharuch customs dated from this siege.

Battle of Dholka (1741)

In 1741, in a battle between Káim Kúli Khán, governor of Dholka, and Rangoji's deputy, the Maráthás were defeated. Momín Khán, at the request of Rangoji, made peace between them. Fidá-ud-dín Khán, who had recently been raised in rank with the title of Bahádur, starting to collect tribute burned down the refractory Koli village of Dabhoda, and placing a post there, passed to Satumba, Balasinor, and Thásra. After the battle at Dholka, the building by Rangoji of the fort of Borsad, caused renewed fighting between the Mughals and Maráthás of Dholka. At the request of Muhammad Hádi Khán, governor of Dholka, Fidá-ud-dín Khán, passing through Mahudha to Petlád pushed forward to help him. In the meantime a battle was fought, in which the Maráthás under Malhárráv attacked Muhammad Hádi Khán, and after a short contest withdrew. Next day the Mughals, strengthened by the arrival of Fidá-ud-dín Khán, besieged Sojitra. A letter was written to Rangoji, asking the meaning of the attack, and he replied excusing himself and attributing it to the ignorance of Malhárráv. Muhammad Hádi Khán and the author of the Mirăt-i-Áhmedi eventually met Rangoji at Borsad, and settled that he and Fidá-ud-dín Khán should come together and arrange matters. But Rangoji in his heart intended to fight and wrote to his deputy Rámáji at Áhmedábád to be ready for war. Malhárráv now joined Rangoji at Borsad. At this time many misunderstandings and several fights between the Maráthás and the Muhammadans were appeased by Momín Khán and Rangoji, who, in spite of the ill-feeling among their subordinates and a certain distrust of each other's designs, appear throughout to have maintained a warm mutual regard. Dámáji from his stronghold at Songad was too much occupied in Dakhan politics to give much attention to Gujarát. Rangoji, on the other hand, gained so much influence with the Gujarát chiefs, that at one time he succeeded in engaging Sajansingh Hazári in his service, and also induced Rája Ráisingh of Ídar to join him. But Momín Khán detached Ráisingh from this alliance, by placing him in charge of the post of Amaliara and granting him the districts of Modasa, Meghrej, Ahmednagar (Himatnagar), Prantij, and Harsol. Moreover, the customary Gujarát sum at first sent daily by Rangoji to Rája Ráisingh for the expenses of his troops had begun to fall into arrears. Rája Ráisingh made his peace with Momín Khán through the mediation of Nazar Áli Khán, Momín Khán's nephew, who appears to have been one of the leading spirits of the time.

In 1742, in another fight between the Maráthás and Mughals in Áhmedábád, the Mughals gained a slight advantage. After this Rangoji left the city, appointing as before Rámáji as his deputy, and joining Jagjíwan Pavár went to Borsad, where he had built a fort. At this time one Jívandás came with authority from the Nizám to act as collector of Dholka, part of the lands assigned to the Nizám as a personal grant, but failed to enforce his position. Shortly after this Rája Ánandsing of Ídar was killed, and his brother Ráising, taking leave, went to Ídar to settle matters. Momín Khán had his patent increased to the personal rank of commander of 6000 with a contingent of 6000 cavalry. He received a dress of honour, a jewelled turban, a plume, six pieces of cloth, an elephant, the order of Máhi-marátib, (Note: The Máhi-marátib was a banner having the likeness of a fish at its top.) and the title of Najm-ud-daulah Momín Khán Bahádur Diláwar Jang. Differences again broke out between Momín Khán and Rangoji, and again matters were settled by a friendly meeting between the two chiefs at Borsad, where Rangoji had taken up his residence. Momín Khán now went to Petlád, and from that to Cambay, where he was taken ill, but after six weeks came to Vasu, where Rangoji visited him. Here though again unwell he went to Dholka, and shortly afterwards he and Rangoji marched upon Limbdi, which at this time is mentioned as under Víramgám. While before Limbḍi, Rangoji was summoned by Dámáji to help him against Bápu Náik, and at once started to his assistance. Momín Khán now marched into Gohilwad, and proceeded by Loliana to Ghogha, then under the charge of a resident deputy of Sher Khán Bábi. Here he received tribute from the chief of Sihor, and from that, marching into Halar, went against Nawanagar. The Jám resisted for twenty days, and eventually, on his agreeing to pay Rupees 50,000 as tribute, Momín Khán returned to Áhmedábád. During his absence in spite of stubborn resistance, Nazar Áli Khán and Vajerám had collected tribute from the Koli chiefs. Rangoji, who had now left Dámáji, joined battle with Bápu Náik ere he crossed the Mahi, and Bápu Náik turned back. Rangoji therefore remained at Borsad, but hearing that Momín Khán's illness had become serious, he went once or twice to Áhmedábád to visit him. In 1743, Momín Khán died.

=== Fidá-ud-dín acts as Viceroy, 1743 ===
Momin Khan's wife, fearing lest Fidá-ud-dín Khán and Muftakhir Khán, Momín Khán's son, would deprive her of her estate, sought the protection of Rangoji. In the meantime Fidá-ud-dín Khán and Muftakhir Khán received an imperial order to carry on the government until a new viceroy should be appointed. At this time a man named Ánandrám, who had been disgraced by Momín Khán, went over to Rangoji and incited him to murder Fidá-ud-dín Khán and Muftakhir Khán. Rangoji with this intention invited them both to his house, but his heart failed him, and shortly afterwards Fidá-ud-dín Khán went to Cambay. Rangoji now determined at all hazards to assassinate Muftakhir Khán. With this object he took Muftakhir Khán's associates, Vajerám and Káim Kúli Khán, into his confidence. Muftakhir Khán accidentally heard of his designs, and remained on his guard. As Rangoji had failed to carry out his promise to raise Sher Khán Bábi to the post of deputy viceroy, Sher Khán advanced to Dholka and began plundering some Cambay villages. Rangoji, after another futile attempt to assassinate Muftakhir Khán, sent for his deputy Rámáji, who was then in the neighbourhood, and prepared to fight. Muftakhir Khán, on his part, summoned Fidá-ud-dín Khán from Cambay, and in a few days they succeeded in uniting their forces. Sher Khán Bábi deserting the cause of Rangoji, the Maráthás were worsted and Rangoji's house was besieged. Rangoji, being hard pressed, agreed to give up Ánandrám and to surrender both Borsad and Víramgám, Sher Khán Bábi becoming his security. In this way Fidá-ud-dín Khán became sole master of Gujarát.

Shortly after Dámáji Gáikwár returned from Satara and came to Cambay. In the meantime Rangoji, who had been living with Sher Khán Bábi, his security, contrived, with the connivance of Sher Khán, to escape together with his family. Fidá-ud-dín Khán was so greatly enraged with Sher Khán for this treachery, that Sher Khán leaving Áhmedábád on pretence of hunting, escaped to Bálásinor, where his wife joined him. Fidá-ud-dín Khán put Ánandrám to death, while Rangoji through the aid of Sher Khán Bábi's wife, made good his escape to Borsad. Fidá-ud-dín Khán had set out to collect tribute, when news arrived that Khanderáv Gáikwár, brother of Dámáji, had crossed the Mahi and joining Rangoji had laid siege to Petlád. On hearing this, Fidá-ud-dín at once returned to Áhmedábád, and sent Valabhdás Kotwál to Khanderáv to complain of the misconduct of Rangoji.

==== Abdúl Ázíz Khán of Junnar, Viceroy (by a forged order) ====
After the death of Momín Khán, Jawán Mard Khán Bábi was the greatest noble in Gujarát. He began to aspire to power, and Fidá-ud-dín, who was not good in the field, had thoughts of appointing him as a deputy. While matters were in this state, and Jawán Mard Khán was already laying claim to the revenue of the district round Áhmedábád, an order was received appointing Abdúl Ázíz Khán the commander of Junnar, near Poona, to be viceroy of Gujarát. This order was forged by Abdúl Ázíz Khán in Jawán Mard Khán's interests, whom he appointed his deputy. Though Fidá-ud-dín Khán doubted the genuineness of the order, he was not powerful enough to remove Jawán Mard Khán, who accordingly proclaimed himself deputy viceroy.

Mutiny of the Troops

At this time the troops, clamorous on account of arrears, placed both Fidá-ud-dín Khán and Muftakhir Khán under confinement. Jawán Mard Khán assumed charge of the city and stationed his own men on guard. While Fidá-ud-dín Khán and Muftakhir Khán were in confinement, Khanderáv Gáikwár sent them a message that if they would cause the fort of Petlád to be surrendered to him, he would help them. To this they returned no answer. Fidá-ud-dín Khán now entreated Jawán Mard Khán to interfere between him and his troops. Jawán Mard Khán accordingly persuaded the mutineers to release Fidá-ud-dín Khán, who eventually escaped from the city and went to Agra.

Maráthás Capture Petlád

Meanwhile, Rangoji continued to press the siege of Petlád and the commander, Ágha Muhammad Husain, after in vain appealing for help to Jawán Mard Khán, was forced to surrender. Rangoji demolished the fort of Petlád and marched upon Áhmedábád. As he approached the city Jawán Mard Khán sent the writer of the Mirăt-i-Áhmedi and Ajabsingh to negotiate with Rangoji, who demanded all his former rights and possessions.

=== Muftakhir Khán, Fifty-seventh Viceroy, 1743–44 ===
News had now reached Delhi that a false viceroy was governing Gujarát, and accordingly Muftakhir Khán was chosen fifty-seventh viceroy, the order explaining that Abdúl Ázíz had never been appointed viceroy, and directing Jawán Mard Khán to withdraw from the conduct of affairs. Muftakhir Khán was perplexed how to act. He succeeded in persuading his troops that he would be able to pay them their arrears, and he sent a copy of the order to Jawán Mard Khán; and, as he dared not displace him, he informed Jawán Mard Khán that he had appointed him as his deputy, and that he himself would shortly leave Áhmedábád. Jawán Mard Khán, so far from obeying, ordered Muftakhir Khán's house to be surrounded. Eventually Muftakhir Khán, leaving the city, joined Rangoji, and then retired to Cambay.

The Maráthás in Áhmedábád

Khanderáv Gáikwár returned, and, with the view of enforcing his claims, uniting with Rangoji, marched to Banjar, about five miles south of Áhmedábád. Jawán Mard Khán issuing from the city camped near the Kankaria Lake. Narhar Pandit and Krishnáji on behalf of the Marátha leaders were sent to Jawán Mard Khán to demand their former rights and possessions. Jawán at first refused, but in the end gave way and the Maráthás appointed Dádu Morár deputy of the city. Sher Khán Bábi now returned to Bálásinor. Khanderáv and Kánáji then went to Dholka, Rangoji to Petlád, and Khanderáv Gáikwár to Sorath. Fidá-ud-dín Khán requested Rangoji to help Muftakhir Khán; he replied that he was willing to help him, but had no money. Rangoji then accompanied Fidá-ud-dín Khán to Cambay, where Muftakhir Khán was. Negotiations were entered into, and the Kháns tried to collect 100,000 rupees which Rangoji asked for to enable him to make military preparations to aid them. They raised Rupees 80,000 with great difficulty and admitted Rangoji's Náib to a share in the administration. Rangoji withdrew to Borsad with the Rupees 80,000 under the pretext that when the remaining 20,000 rupees were paid he would take action. Fidá-ud-dín Khán, annoyed at Rangoji's conduct, went to reside at Dhowan, a village belonging to Jálam Jália Koli.

Battle of Kím Kathodra and defeat and death of Abdúl Ázíz Khán, 1744

In 1744 Jawán Mard Khán, after appointing one of his brothers, Zoráwar Khán, his deputy at Pátan, and keeping his other brother Safdar Khán at Áhmedábád, advanced from the city to Kadi to collect tribute. His next step was to invite Abdúl Ázíz Khán, the commander of Junnar, near Poona, to join him in Gujarát. Abdul Ázíz accordingly set out from Junnar, taking with him Fatehyáb Khán, commander of the fort of Mulher in Baglan and Rustamráv Marátha. Directing his march in the first instance to Surat he was there watched in the interests of Dámáji Gáikwár, by Deváji Tákpar, the lieutenant of that chief, who, seeing that on leaving Surat, Abdúl Ázíz continued to advance to Áhmedábád, pursued him to Kím Kathodra, about fifteen miles north-west of Surat, and there attacked him. In the engagement Deváji Tákpar, who had gained over Rustamráv Marátha, one of the leading men in Abdúl Ázíz's army, was victorious. Abdúl Ázíz Khán retired, but was so closely followed by the Maráthás, that at Panoli he was forced to leave his elephant, and, mounting a horse, fled with all speed towards Bharuch. On reaching the Narmada, he failed to find any boats, and, as his pursuers were close upon him, putting his horse at the water, he tried to swim the river; but, sticking fast in the mud, he was overtaken and slain by the Maráthás.

=== Fakhr-ud-daulah, Fifty-eighth Viceroy, 1744–1748 ===
On hearing of the death of Abdúl Ázíz, Jawán Mard Khán thought of joining Muftakhir Khán. Here he could carry this plan into effect, the emperor receiving, it is said, a present of 200,000 rupees for the nomination, appointed Fakhr-ud-daulah Fakhr-ud-dín Khán Shujáât Jang Bahádur the fifty-eighth viceroy of Gujarát. The new viceroy forwarded a blank paper to a banker of his acquaintance named Sitárám, asking him to enter in it the name of a fitting deputy. Jawán Mard Khán Bábi, Deputy Viceroy. Sitárám filled in the name of Jawán Mard Khán, and Fakhr-ud-daulah was proclaimed viceroy. About this time Safdar Khán Bábi, after levying tribute from the Sábarmati chiefs, returned to Áhmedábád, and Khanderáv Gáikwár, as he passed from Sorath to Songad, appointed Rangoji his deputy. On being appointed deputy Rangoji sent Krishnáji instead of Morár Náik as his deputy to Áhmedábád, and himself proceeded to Arhar-Mátar on the Vátrak, and from that moved to Kaira (Kheda) to visit Jawán Mard Khán, with whom he established friendly relations. In the same year Áli Muhammad Khán, superintendent of customs, died, and in his place the author of the Mirăt-i-Áhmedi was appointed. In this year, too, Pahár Khán Jhálori died, and his uncle, Muhammad Bahádur, was appointed governor of Pálanpur in his stead.

Khanderáv Gáikwár called to Sátára

About this time Umábái, widow of Khanderáv Dábháde, summoned Khanderáv Gáikwár to help her in her attempt to lessen the power of the Peshwa. As Dámáji Gáikwár could not be spared from the Dakhan, Khanderáv was appointed his deputy in Gujarát, and he chose one Rámchandra to represent him at Áhmedábád. When Fakhr-ud-daulah advanced to join his appointment as viceroy he was received at Bálásinor with much respect by Sher Khán Bábi. Jawán Mard Khán Bábi, on the other hand, determining to resist Fakhr-ud-daulah to the utmost of his power, summoned Gangádhar with a body of Marátha horse from Petlád, and posting them at Isanpur, about ten miles south-west of the city, himself leaving the fortifications of Áhmedábád, encamped at Asarva, about a mile and a half from the walls. During his progress towards the capital the new viceroy was joined by Ráisinghji of Idar at Kapadvanj, and, advancing together, they arrived at Bhílpur, eighteen miles east of Áhmedábád. On their approach Jawán Mard Khán sent Safdar Khán and Gangádhar to oppose them, and the two armies met about six miles from the capital. After some fighting Fakhr-ud-daulah succeeded in forcing his way to the suburb of Rájpura, and next day continuing to drive back the enemy occupied the suburb of Behrampura and began the actual siege of the city. At this point affairs took a turn. Fakhr-ud-daulah was wounded and returned to his camp, while Jawán Mard Khán succeeded in winning over to his side Sher Khán Bábi and Ráisinghji of Ídar, two of the viceroy's chief supporters. The Mirăt-i-Áhmedi especially notes that Rája Ráisingh asked for money to pay his troops but Fakhr-ud-daulah, not knowing that this rule had long been a dead letter, said that as he held a district on service tenure, it was not proper for him to ask for a money aid when on imperial service.

Next day Fakhr-ud-daulah was surrounded by Safdar Khán Bábi and the Maráthás, and himself one wife and some children were taken prisoners, while another of his wives and his son, who had managed to escape to Sidhpur, were captured and brought back to Áhmedábád.

Rangoji Disgraced by Khanderáv Gáikwár

After this Khanderáv Gáikwár returned to Gujarát to receive his share of the spoil taken from Fakhr-ud-daulah. Reaching Borsad, he took Rangoji with him as far as Áhmedábád, where he met Jawán Mard Khán, and obtained from Rangoji his share of the tribute. Khanderáv was not satisfied with Rangoji's accounts, and appointing a fresh deputy, he attached Rangoji's property, and before leaving Áhmedábád for Sorath, put him in confinement at Borsad. He also confined Fakhr-ud-daulah in the Ghiáspur outpost on the bank of the Mahi river. Meanwhile, in consequence of some misunderstanding between Jawán Mard Khán Bábi and his brother Safdar Khán, the latter retired to Udepur, and Jawán Mard Khán went to Visalnagar (Visnagar) then in the hands of his brother Zoráwar Khán. From Visalnagar, Jawán Mard Khán proceeded to Radhanpur, and meeting his brother Safdar Khán, they became reconciled, and returned together to Áhmedábád. Khanderáv Gáikwár, who had in the meantime returned from Sorath, encamping at Dholka appointed Trimbakráv Pandit as his deputy at Áhmedábád in place of Moro Pandit. On hearing that Rangoji had been thrown into confinement, Umábái sent for him, and he along with Khanderáv Gáikwár repaired to the Dakhan.

Shortly afterwards Punáji Vithal, in concert with Trimbak Pandit, being dissatisfied with Jawán Mard Khán, began to intrigue with Fakhr-ud-daulah. In the meantime Umábái had appointed Rangoji as her deputy, and, as he was a staunch friend of Jawán Mard Khán, he expelled Trimbakráv from Áhmedábád, and himself collected the Marátha share of the city revenues. Upon this Punáji Vithal sent Gangádhar and Krishnáji with an army, and they, expelling the Mughal officers from the districts from which the Maráthás levied the one-fourth share of the revenue, took the management of them into their own hands. Rangoji now asked Sher Khán Bábi to help him. Sher Khán agreed; but as he had not funds to pay his troops, he delayed, and afterwards plundered Mahudha and Nadiad. As Rangoji failed to join him, Sher Khán proceeded by himself to Kapadvanj, and from Kapadvanj marched against the Marátha camp, with which Fakhr-ud-daulah was then associated. On the night after his arrival, the Maráthás made an attack on Sher Khán's camp, in which many men on both sides were slain. Next morning the battle was renewed, but on Sher Khán suggesting certain terms the fighting ceased. That very night, hearing that Rangoji had reached Bálásinor, Sher Khán stole off towards Kapadvanj. Punáji and Fakhr-ud-daulah followed in pursuit but failed to prevent Rangoji and Sher Khán from joining their forces.

Siege of Kapadvanj by Fakhr-ud-daulah, 1746

In 1746 a battle was fought in the neighbourhood of the town of Kapadvanj in which Sher Khán was wounded. He was forced to take shelter with Rangoji in Kapadvanj, while Fakhr-ud-daulah, Gangádhar, and Krishnáji laid siege to that town. At this time the Lunáváḍa chief asked Malhárráv Holkar on his way back from his yearly raid into Malwa, to join him in attacking Virpur. Holkar agreed and Virpur was plundered. Rangoji, hearing of the arrival of Holkar, begged him to come to his aid, and on promise of receiving a sum of 200,000 rupees and two elephants, Holkar consented. Gangádhar, Krishnáji, and Fakhr-ud-daulah, hearing of the approach of Holkar, raised the siege of Kapadvanj, and marching to Dholka expelled the governor of that district. Shortly afterwards on a summons from Dámáji and Khanderáv Gáikwár Rangoji retired to Baroda. Meanwhile, Fakhr-ud-daulah, Krishnáji, and Gangádhar advanced to Jetalpur in the Daskroi sub-division of Áhmedábád and, taking possession of it, expelled Ámbar Habshi, the deputy of Jawán Mard Khán. Dámáji and Khanderáv Gáikwár passed from Baroda to Vasu, where they were met by Krishnáji and Gangádhar, whom Dámáji censured for aiding Fakhr-ud-daulah. On this occasion Dámáji bestowed the districts of Baroda Naḍiád and Borsad on his brother Khanderáv, an action which for ever removed any ill feeling on the part of Khanderáv. Then, proceeding to Goklej, Dámáji had an interview with Jawán Mard Khán. From Goklej he sent Kánoji Tákpar with Fakhr-ud-daulah to Sorath, and himself returned to Songaḍ. As Borsad had been given to Khanderáv, Rangoji fixed on Umreth as his residence.

In this year, 1746, Teghbeg Khán, governor of Surat, died, and was succeeded by his brother Safdar Muhammad Khán, who, in acknowledgment of a present of seven horses, received from the emperor the title of Bahádur. At this time Tálib Áli Khán died, and the writer of the Mirăt-i-Áhmedi was appointed minister by the emperor. In 1747, Rangoji returned to Áhmedábád, and Jawán Mard Khán had an interview with him a few miles from the city. Shortly after this the Kolis of Mehmudabad and Mahudha rebelled, but the revolt was speedily crushed by Sháhbáz Rohilla.

Momín Khán II. Governor of Cambay, 1748

During this year Najm Khán, governor of Cambay, died. Muftakhir Khán, son of Najm-ud-daulah Momín Khán I., who had also received the title of Momín Khán II, informed the emperor of Najm Khán's death, and himself assumed the office of governor in which in 1748 he was confirmed. On hearing of the death of Najm Khán, on pretense of condoling with the family of the late governor, Fidá-ud-dín Khán marched to Cambay, but as he was not allowed to enter the town he retired. He afterwards went to Umreth and lived with Rangoji. Kánoji Tákpar, who had gone with Fakhr-ud-daulah into Sorath, now laid siege to and took the town of Vanthali. As it was nearly time for the Maráthás to return to their country, Kánoji and Fakhr-ud-daulah, retiring to Dholka, expelled Muhammad Jánbáz, the deputy governor. Rangoji, who had at this time a dispute with Jawán Mard Khán regarding his share of tribute, now came and joined them, and their combined forces marched upon Sanand, where, after plundering the town, they encamped. It was now time for Kánoji to withdraw to the Dakhan (Deccan). Rangoji and Fakhr-ud-daulah, remaining behind to collect tribute from the neighbouring districts, marched to Ísanpur, where they were opposed by Jawán Mard Khán. On this occasion both Jawán Mard Khán and Fakhr-ud-daulah sought the alliance of Rája Ráisingh of Ídar. But, as he offered more favourable terms, Rája Ráisingh determined to join Fakhr-ud-daulah. Sher Khán Bábi also joined Fakhr-ud-daulah, who, thus reinforced, laid siege to Áhmedábád. While these events were passing at Áhmedábád, Hariba, an adopted son of Khanderáv Gáikwár, at that time in possession of the fort of Borsad, began to plunder Rangoji's villages under Petlád, and, attacking his deputy, defeated and killed him. On this Rangoji withdrew from Áhmedábád, attacked and captured the fort of Borsad, and forced Hariba to leave the country. Jawán Mard Khán now sent for Janárdhan Pandit, Khanderáv's deputy at Naḍiád, and, in place of Rangoji's representative, appointed him to manage the Marátha share of Áhmedábád.

Surat Affairs, 1748

During these years important changes had taken place in the government of Surat. In 1734, when Mulla Muhammad Áli, the chief of the merchants and builder of the Athva fort, was killed in prison by Teghbeg Khán, the Nizám sent Sayad Miththan to revenge his death. Sayad Miththan was forced to return unsuccessful. After Teghbeg Khán's death, Sayad Miththan again came to Surat and lived there with his brother Sayad Achchan, who held the office of paymaster. Sayad Miththan tried to get the government of the town into his hands, but, again failing, committed suicide. His brother Sayad Achchan then attacked and took the citadel, expelling the commander; and for several days war was waged between him and the governor Safdar Muhammad Khán with doubtful success. At last Sayad Achchan called to his aid Malhárráv, the deputy at Baroda, and their combined forces took possession of the whole city. During the sack of the city, Malhárráv was killed and the entire management of affairs fell into the hands of Sayad Achchan. Safdar Muhammad Khán, the late governor, though obliged to leave the city, was determined not to give up Surat without a struggle, and raising some men opened fire on the fort. Sayad Achchan now begged the Arab, Turk, English, Dutch and Portuguese merchants to aid him. A deed addressed to the emperor and the Nizám, begging that Sayad Achchan should be appointed governor, was signed by all the merchants except by Mr. Lamb the English chief, and though he at first refused, he was in the end persuaded by the other merchants to sign. The merchants then assisted Sayad Achchan, and Safdar Muhammad Khán retired to Sindh.

Mulla Fakhr-ud-din Escapes to Bombay and Cession of Surat Revenue to the Gáikwár, 1747

Sayad Achchan agreed, but on the way Mr. Lamb carried off Mulla Fakhr-ud-dín to the English factory, and afterwards sent him to Bombay (now Mumbai) in disguise. In the meantime Kedárji Gáikwár, a cousin of Dámáji's, whom, with Malhárrav, Sayad Achchan had asked to his help, arrived at Surat, and though Sayad Achchan had been successful without his aid, Kedárji demanded the 300,000 rupees which had been promised him. As the Sayad was not in a position to resist Kedárji's demands, and as he had no ready money to give him, he made over to him a third of the revenues of Surat until the amount should be paid. As before this another third of the revenues of Surat had been assigned to Háfiz Masûud Khán, the deputy of Yákut Khán of Janjira, the emoluments of the governor of Surat were reduced to one-third of the entire revenue and this was divided between the Mutasaddi and Bakhshi.

In 1747 (Samvat 1803), there was a severe shock of earthquake and a great famine which caused many deaths. In the following year, Jawán Mard Khán endeavoured to recapture Jetalpur, but failed. About the same time Umábái died, and Dámáji's brother Khanderáv, who was on good terms with Ambiká, wife of Báburáv Senápati, the guardian of Umábái's son, procured his own appointment as deputy of his brother Dámáji in Gujarát. On being appointed deputy, Khanderáv at once marched against Rangoji to recover Borsad, which, as above mentioned, Rangoji had taken from Hariba. Their forces were joined by two detachments, one from Momín Khán under the command of Ágha Muhammad Husain, the other from Jawán Mard Khán commanded by Janárdhan Pandit. The combined army besieged Borsad. After a five months' siege, Borsad was taken, and Rangoji was imprisoned by Khanderáv. On the fall of Borsad Sher Khán Bábi and Rája Ráisingh of Ídar, who were allies of Rangoji, returned to Bálásinor and Ídar; Fakhr-ud-daulah was sent to Petlád and Fidá-ud-dín Khán, leaving Umreth, took shelter with Jetha, the chief of Atarsumba.

In 1748, the Mughal emperor Muhammad Shah died and was succeeded by his son Ahmad Shah Bahadur (r. 1748–1754).

== List of Viceroys under Muhammad Shah (1719–1748) ==
- Mahárája Ajítsingh, Forty-ninth Viceroy, 1719–1721 (second time)
- Haidar Kúli Khán, Fiftieth Viceroy, 1721–1722
- Nizám-ul-Mulk, Fifty-first Viceroy, 1722
- Sarbuland Khan, Fifty-second Viceroy, 1723–1730
- Mahárája Abheysingh, Fifty-third Viceroy, 1730–1733
  - Ratansingh Bhandári, Deputy Viceroy, 1733–1737
- Momín Khán, Fifty-fourth Viceroy, 1737
- Mahárája Abheysingh, Fifty-fifth Viceroy, 1737 (second time)
- Momín Khán, Fifth-sixth Viceroy, 1738–1743 (second time)
  - Fidá-ud-dín acts as Viceroy, 1743
  - Abdúl Ázíz Khán of Junnar, Viceroy (by a forged order)
- Muftakhir Khán, Fifty-seventh Viceroy, 1743–44
- Fakhr-ud-daulah, Fifty-eighth Viceroy, 1744–1748
