= Bolgur =

Bolgur (Persian: بلگور), also rendered as Bowlgur, may refer to:

- Bala Bolgur
- Pain Bolgur
