= Markiyeh =

Markiyeh (Persian: مركيه) may refer to:

- Markiyeh, Masal
- Markiyeh, Sowme'eh Sara
- Markiyeh Rural District, in Sowme'eh Sara
