= Tataf =

Village in Gilan province, Iran

Tataf Persian: تطف
- Village
- Location within Iran
- Coordinates: 37°17′14″N 49°12′14″E
- Country: Iran
- Province: Gilan
- County: Sowme'eh Sara
- District: Mirza Kuchek Janghli
- Rural District: Gurab Zarmikh

Population (2016)
  - Total: 662
- Time zone: UTC+3:30 (IRST)

Tataf (Persian: تطف) (Note: Also romanized as Taţaf; also known as Tetev) is a village in Gurab Zarmikh Rural District of Mirza Kuchek Janghli District in Sowme'eh Sara County, Gilan province, Iran.

== Demographics ==
=== Population ===
At the time of the 2006 National Census, the village's population was 1,142 in 285 households. The following census in 2011 counted 720 people in 215 households. The 2016 census measured the population of the village as 662 people in 218 households.
