= Posht Mekh =

Village in Gilan province, Iran

Posht Mekh Persian: پشت مخ
- Village
- Location within Iran
- Coordinates: 37°19′16″N 49°11′24″E
- Country: Iran
- Province: Gilan
- County: Sowme'eh Sara
- District: Mirza Kuchek Janghli
- Rural District: Gurab Zarmikh

Population (2016)
  - Total: 534
- Time zone: UTC+3:30 (IRST)

Posht Mekh (Persian: پشت مخ) (Note: Also romanized as Posht Makh; also known as Pushtamah and Pushtamikh) is a village in Gurab Zarmikh Rural District of Mirza Kuchek Janghli District in Sowme'eh Sara County, Gilan province, Iran.

== Demographics ==
=== Population ===
At the time of the 2006 National Census, the village's population was 703 in 199 households. The following census in 2011 counted 647 people in 189 households. The 2016 census measured the population of the village as 534 people in 176 households.
