= Siah Estalkh, Sowme'eh Sara =

Village in Gilan province, Iran

Siah Estalkh Persian: سياه اسطلخ
- Village
- Location within Iran
- Coordinates: 37°16′09″N 49°16′37″E
- Country: Iran
- Province: Gilan
- County: Sowme'eh Sara
- District: Mirza Kuchek Janghli
- Rural District: Markiyeh

Population (2016)
  - Total: 334
- Time zone: UTC+3:30 (IRST)

Siah Estalkh (Persian: سياه اسطلخ) (Note: Also romanized as Sīāh Asţalakh and Sīāh Esţalkh) is a village in Markiyeh Rural District of Mirza Kuchek Janghli District in Sowme'eh Sara County, Gilan province, Iran.

== Demographics ==
=== Population ===
At the time of the 2006 National Census, the village's population was 388 in 113 households. The following census in 2011 counted 393 people in 120 households. The 2016 census measured the population of the village as 334 people in 109 households.
