= Pord-e Sar =

Village in Gilan province, Iran

Pord-e Sar Persian: پردسر
- Village
- Location within Iran
- Coordinates: 37°20′24″N 49°15′04″E
- Country: Iran
- Province: Gilan
- County: Sowme'eh Sara
- District: Mirza Kuchek Janghli
- Rural District: Markiyeh

Population (2016)
  - Total: 125
- Time zone: UTC+3:30 (IRST)

Pord-e Sar (Persian: پردسر) (Note: Also romanized as Pordesar; Gilaki: پۊرد ٚ سر) is a village in Markiyeh Rural District of Mirza Kuchek Janghli District in Sowme'eh Sara County, Gilan province, Iran.

== Demographics ==
=== Population ===
At the time of the 2006 National Census, the village's population was 129 in 39 households. The following census in 2011 counted 143 people in 44 households. The 2016 census measured the population of the village as 125 people in 43 households.
