= Siah Kuh, Sowme'eh Sara =

Village in Gilan province, Iran

Siah Kuh Persian: سياه كوه
- Village
- Location within Iran
- Coordinates: 37°17′33″N 49°10′46″E
- Country: Iran
- Province: Gilan
- County: Sowme'eh Sara
- District: Mirza Kuchek Janghli
- Rural District: Gurab Zarmikh

Population (2016)
  - Total: 313
- Time zone: UTC+3:30 (IRST)

Siah Kuh (Persian: سیاه‌کوه) (Note: Also romanized as Sīāh Kūh) is a village in Gurab Zarmikh Rural District of Mirza Kuchek Janghli District in Sowme'eh Sara County, Gilan province, Iran.

== Demographics ==
=== Population ===
At the time of the 2006 National Census, the village's population was 414 in 96 households. The following census in 2011 counted 472 people in 132 households. The 2016 census measured the population of the village as 313 people in 103 households.
