= Pir Sara, Sowme'eh Sara =

Village in Gilan province, Iran

Pir Sara Persian: پيرسرا
- Village
- Location within Iran
- Coordinates: 37°19′09″N 49°13′43″E
- Country: Iran
- Province: Gilan
- County: Sowme'eh Sara
- District: Mirza Kuchek Janghli
- Rural District: Gurab Zarmikh

Population (2016)
  - Total: 434
- Time zone: UTC+3:30 (IRST)

Pir Sara (Persian: پيرسرا) (Note: Also romanized as Pīr Sarā; also known as Pursre) is a village in Gurab Zarmikh Rural District of Mirza Kuchek Janghli District in Sowme'eh Sara County, Gilan province, Iran.

== Demographics ==
=== Population ===
At the time of the 2006 National Census, the village's population was 634 in 167 households. The following census in 2011 counted 444 people in 128 households. The 2016 census measured the population of the village as 434 people in 137 households.
