= Kherf =

Village in Gilan province, Iran

Kherf Persian: خرف
- Village
- Location within Iran
- Coordinates: 37°18′57″N 49°17′40″E
- Country: Iran
- Province: Gilan
- County: Sowme'eh Sara
- District: Mirza Kuchek Janghli
- Rural District: Markiyeh

Population (2016)
  - Total: 58
- Time zone: UTC+3:30 (IRST)

Kherf (Persian: خرف) (Note: Also romanized as Kharaf) is a village in Markiyeh Rural District of Mirza Kuchek Janghli District in Sowme'eh Sara County, Gilan province, Iran.

== Demographics ==
=== Population ===
At the time of the 2006 National Census, the village's population was 116 in 36 households. The following census in 2011 counted 89 people in 26 households. The 2016 census measured the population of the village as 58 people in 20 households.
