= Mianbar =

Mianbar (Persian: ميان بر) may refer to:

- Mianbar, Gilan
- Mianbar, Qazvin
