= Posht Mesar =

Village in Gilan province, Iran

Posht Mesar Persian: پشتمسار
- Village
- Location within Iran
- Coordinates: 37°19′06″N 49°14′30″E
- Country: Iran
- Province: Gilan
- County: Sowme'eh Sara
- District: Mirza Kuchek Janghli
- Rural District: Markiyeh

Population (2016)
  - Total: 996
- Time zone: UTC+3:30 (IRST)

Posht Mesar (Persian: پشتمسار) (Note: Also romanized as Posht Mesār; also known as Posht Mīān) is a village in Markiyeh Rural District of Mirza Kuchek Janghli District in Sowme'eh Sara County, Gilan province, Iran.

== Demographics ==
=== Population ===
At the time of the 2006 National Census, the village's population was 1,438 in 380 households. The following census in 2011 counted 1,124 people in 347 households. The 2016 census measured the population of the village as 996 people in 358 households.
