= Seh Sar =

Village in Gilan province, Iran

Seh Sar Persian: سه سار
- Village
- Location within Iran
- Coordinates: 37°15′45″N 49°11′22″E
- Country: Iran
- Province: Gilan
- County: Sowme'eh Sara
- District: Mirza Kuchek Janghli
- Rural District: Gurab Zarmikh

Population (2016)
  - Total: 1,192
- Time zone: UTC+3:30 (IRST)

Seh Sar (Persian: سه سار) (Note: Also romanized as Seh Sār) is a village in Gurab Zarmikh Rural District of Mirza Kuchek Janghli District in Sowme'eh Sara County, Gilan province, Iran.

== Demographics ==
=== Population ===
At the time of the 2006 National Census, the village's population was 1,425 in 338 households. The following census in 2011 counted 1,413 people in 387 households. The 2016 census measured the population of the village as 1,192 people in 386 households.
