= Chalak Sar =

Village in Gilan province, Iran

Chalak Sar Persian: چالكسر
- Village
- Location within Iran
- Coordinates: 37°17′00″N 49°11′34″E
- Country: Iran
- Province: Gilan
- County: Sowme'eh Sara
- District: Mirza Kuchek Janghli
- Rural District: Gurab Zarmikh

Population (2016)
  - Total: 525
- Time zone: UTC+3:30 (IRST)

Chalak Sar (Persian: چالكسر) (Note: Also romanized as Chālak Sar and Chāleksar) is a village in Gurab Zarmikh Rural District of Mirza Kuchek Janghli District in Sowme'eh Sara County, Gilan province, Iran.

== Demographics ==
=== Population ===
At the time of the 2006 National Census, the village's population was 680 in 169 households. The following census in 2011 counted 627 people in 199 households. The 2016 census measured the population of the village as 525 people in 188 households.
