= Tan Yen =

Tan Yen may refer to:

- Tan-Yen, Iran
- Tân Yên District, Vietnam
