= Seh Shanbeh =

Village in Gilan province, Iran

Seh Shanbeh Persian: سه شنبه
- Village
- Location within Iran
- Coordinates: 37°17′32″N 49°16′13″E
- Country: Iran
- Province: Gilan
- County: Sowme'eh Sara
- District: Mirza Kuchek Janghli
- Rural District: Markiyeh

Population (2016)
  - Total: 210
- Time zone: UTC+3:30 (IRST)

Seh Shanbeh (Persian: سه شنبه) is a village in Markiyeh Rural District of Mirza Kuchek Janghli District in Sowme'eh Sara County, Gilan province, Iran.

== Demographics ==
=== Population ===
At the time of the 2006 National Census, the village's population was 359 in 105 households. The following census in 2011 counted 330 people in 98 households. The 2016 census measured the population of the village as 210 people in 73 households.
