= Nadaman =

Village in Gilan province, Iran

Nadaman Persian: ندامان
- Village
- Location within Iran
- Coordinates: 37°20′03″N 49°13′00″E
- Country: Iran
- Province: Gilan
- County: Sowme'eh Sara
- District: Mirza Kuchek Janghli
- Rural District: Gurab Zarmikh

Population (2016)
  - Total: 833
- Time zone: UTC+3:30 (IRST)

Nadaman (Persian: ندامان) (Note: Also romanized as Nadāmān and Nedāmān) is a village in Gurab Zarmikh Rural District of Mirza Kuchek Janghli District in Sowme'eh Sara County, Gilan province, Iran.

== Demographics ==
=== Population ===
At the time of the 2006 National Census, the village's population was 1,114 in 288 households. The following census in 2011 counted 941 people in 292 households. The 2016 census measured the population of the village as 833 people in 298 households.
