= Poshtir =

Poshtir (Persian: پشتير) may refer to:

- Poshtir, Sowme'eh Sara
- Poshtir, Mirza Kuchek Janghli, Sowme'eh Sara County
