= Raftagi =

Village in Gilan province, Iran

Raftagi Persian: رفتگی
- Village
- Location within Iran
- Coordinates: 37°18′03″N 49°09′36″E
- Country: Iran
- Province: Gilan
- County: Sowme'eh Sara
- District: Mirza Kuchek Janghli
- Rural District: Gurab Zarmikh

Population (2016)
  - Total: 775
- Time zone: UTC+3:30 (IRST)

Raftagi (Persian: رفتگی) (Note: Also romanized as Raftagī; also known as Raftakī, Rafteh Keh, and Raftekeh) is a village in Gurab Zarmikh Rural District of Mirza Kuchek Janghli District in Sowme'eh Sara County, Gilan province, Iran.

== Demographics ==
=== Population ===
At the time of the 2006 National Census, the village's population was 740 in 158 households. The following census in 2011 counted 773 people in 207 households. The 2016 census measured the population of the village as 775 people in 228 households.
