= Mahvizan =

Village in Gilan province, Iran

Mahvizan Persian: مهويزان
- Village
- Location within Iran
- Coordinates: 37°17′57″N 49°12′19″E
- Country: Iran
- Province: Gilan
- County: Sowme'eh Sara
- District: Mirza Kuchek Janghli
- Rural District: Gurab Zarmikh

Population (2016)
  - Total: 861
- Time zone: UTC+3:30 (IRST)

Mahvizan (Persian: مهويزان) (Note: Also romanized as Mahvīzān; also known as Mamuzān and Mavizen) is a village in Gurab Zarmikh Rural District of Mirza Kuchek Janghli District in Sowme'eh Sara County, Gilan province, Iran.

== Demographics ==
=== Population ===
At the time of the 2006 National Census, the village's population was 1,132 in 317 households. The following census in 2011 counted 1,038 people in 322 households. The 2016 census measured the population of the village as 861 people in 305 households.
