= Surom =

Village in Gilan province, Iran

Surom Persian: سورم
- Village
- Location within Iran
- Coordinates: 37°18′50″N 49°12′53″E
- Country: Iran
- Province: Gilan
- County: Sowme'eh Sara
- District: Mirza Kuchek Janghli
- Rural District: Gurab Zarmikh

Population (2016)
  - Total: 206
- Time zone: UTC+3:30 (IRST)

Surom (Persian: سورم) (Note: Also romanized as Sūrom) is a village in Gurab Zarmikh Rural District of Mirza Kuchek Janghli District in Sowme'eh Sara County, Gilan province, Iran.

== Demographics ==
=== Population ===
At the time of the 2006 National Census, the village's population was 302 in 75 households. The following census in 2011 counted 259 people in 74 households. The 2016 census measured the population of the village as 206 people in 70 households.
