= Markiyeh, Sowme'eh Sara =

Village in Gilan province, Iran

Markiyeh Persian: مركيه
- Village
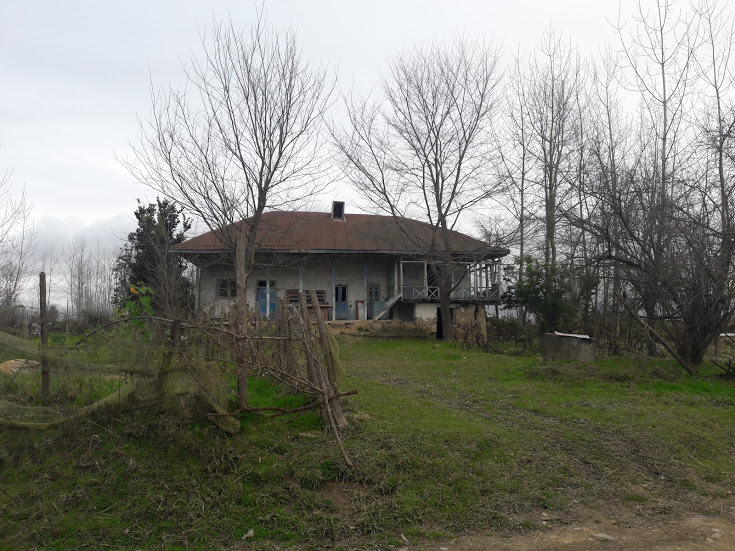
- Traditional architecture in Markiyeh

- Location within Iran
- Coordinates: 37°18′08″N 49°15′14″E
- Country: Iran
- Province: Gilan
- County: Sowme'eh Sara
- District: Mirza Kuchek Janghli
- Rural District: Markiyeh

Population (2016)
  - Total: 1,117
- Time zone: UTC+3:30 (IRST)

Markiyeh (Persian: مركيه) (Note: Also romanized as Markīyeh) is a village in, and the capital of, Markiyeh Rural District in Mirza Kuchek Janghli District of Sowme'eh Sara County, Gilan province, Iran.

== Demographics ==
=== Population ===
At the time of the 2006 National Census, the village's population was 1,625 in 416 households. The following census in 2011 counted 1,323 people in 388 households. The 2016 census measured the population of the village as 1,117 people in 409 households. It was the most populous village in its rural district.
