= Valad =

Village in Gilan province, Iran

Valad Persian: ولد
- Village
- Location within Iran
- Coordinates: 37°19′57″N 49°10′55″E
- Country: Iran
- Province: Gilan
- County: Sowme'eh Sara
- District: Mirza Kuchek Janghli
- Rural District: Gurab Zarmikh

Population (2016)
  - Total: 829
- Time zone: UTC+3:30 (IRST)

Valad (Persian: ولد) (Note: Also romanized as Vald) is a village in Gurab Zarmikh Rural District of Mirza Kuchek Janghli District in Sowme'eh Sara County, Gilan province, Iran.

== Demographics ==
=== Population ===
At the time of the 2006 National Census, the village's population was 1,108 in 310 households. The following census in 2011 counted 978 people in 277 households. The 2016 census measured the population of the village as 829 people in 266 households.
