= Bala Bolgur =

Village in Gilan province, Iran

Bala Bolgur Persian: بالابلگور
- Village
- Location within Iran
- Coordinates: 37°18′01″N 49°16′34″E
- Country: Iran
- Province: Gilan
- County: Sowme'eh Sara
- District: Mirza Kuchek Janghli
- Rural District: Markiyeh

Population (2016)
  - Total: 332
- Time zone: UTC+3:30 (IRST)

Bala Bolgur (Persian: بالابلگور) (Note: Also romanized as Bālā Bolgūr; also known as Bālā Bowlgūr, Bolgūr, and Salgūr) is a village in Markiyeh Rural District of Mirza Kuchek Janghli District in Sowme'eh Sara County, Gilan province, Iran.

== Demographics ==
=== Population ===
At the time of the 2006 National Census, the village's population was 562 in 162 households. The following census in 2011 counted 388 people in 116 households. The 2016 census measured the population of the village as 332 people in 106 households.
