= Poshtir, Mirza Kuchek Janghli =

Village in Gilan province, Iran

Poshtir Persian: پشتير
- Village
- Location within Iran
- Coordinates: 37°16′37″N 49°13′08″E
- Country: Iran
- Province: Gilan
- County: Sowme'eh Sara
- District: Mirza Kuchek Janghli
- Rural District: Gurab Zarmikh

Population (2016)
  - Total: 1,794
- Time zone: UTC+3:30 (IRST)

Poshtir (Persian: پشتير) (Note: Also romanized as Poshtīr; also known as Poshttīr, Pushtir, and Pushtyr’) is a village in Gurab Zarmikh Rural District of Mirza Kuchek Janghli District in Sowme'eh Sara County, Gilan province, Iran.

== Demographics ==
=== Population ===
At the time of the 2006 National Census, the village's population was 2,190 in 568 households. The following census in 2011 counted 2,024 people in 649 households. The 2016 census measured the population of the village as 1,794 people in 610 households.
