= Gurab Zarmikh Rural District =

Rural district in Gilan province, Iran

Gurab Zarmikh Rural District Persian: دهستان گوراب زرميخ
- Rural District
- Location within Iran
- Coordinates: 37°18′N 49°09′E
- Country: Iran
- Province: Gilan
- County: Sowme'eh Sara
- District: Mirza Kuchek Janghli
- Established: 1987
- Capital: Gurab Zarmikh

Population (2016)
  - Total: 12,774
- Time zone: UTC+3:30 (IRST)

Gurab Zarmikh Rural District (Persian: دهستان گوراب زرميخ) is in Mirza Kuchek Janghli District of Sowme'eh Sara County, Gilan province, Iran. It is administered from the city of Gurab Zarmikh.

== Demographics ==
=== Population ===
At the time of the 2006 National Census, the rural district's population was 15,672 in 3,919 households. There were 14,333 inhabitants in 4,189 households at the following census of 2011. The 2016 census measured the population of the rural district as 12,774 in 4,159 households. The most populous of its 14 villages was Tanian, with 3,240 people.

=== Other villages in the rural district ===
- Chalak Sar
- Mahvizan
- Mianbar
- Nadaman
- Pir Sara
- Posht Mekh
- Poshtir
- Raftagi
- Seh Sar
- Siah Kuh
- Surom
- Tataf
- Valad
