= Mianbar, Gilan =

Village in Gilan province, Iran

Mianbar Persian: ميان بر
- Village
- Location within Iran
- Coordinates: 37°19′08″N 49°10′36″E
- Country: Iran
- Province: Gilan
- County: Sowme'eh Sara
- District: Mirza Kuchek Janghli
- Rural District: Gurab Zarmikh

Population (2016)
  - Total: 576
- Time zone: UTC+3:30 (IRST)

Mianbar (Persian: ميان بر) (Note: Also romanized as Mīānbar) is a village in Gurab Zarmikh Rural District of Mirza Kuchek Janghli District in Sowme'eh Sara County, Gilan province, Iran.

== Demographics ==
=== Population ===
At the time of the 2006 National Census, the village's population was 749 in 180 households. The following census in 2011 counted 583 people in 177 households. The 2016 census measured the population of the village as 576 people in 190 households.
