= Tanian =

Village in Gilan province, Iran

Tanian Persian: تنيان
- Village
- Location within Iran
- Coordinates: 37°18′26″N 49°08′28″E
- Country: Iran
- Province: Gilan
- County: Sowme'eh Sara
- District: Mirza Kuchek Janghli
- Rural District: Gurab Zarmikh

Population (2016)
  - Total: 3,240
- Time zone: UTC+3:30 (IRST)

Tanian (Persian: تنيان) (Note: Also romanized as Tanīān; also known as Nanyān and Tan-Yen) is a village in Gurab Zarmikh Rural District of Mirza Kuchek Janghli District in Sowme'eh Sara County, Gilan province, Iran.

== Demographics ==
=== Population ===
At the time of the 2006 National Census, the village's population was 3,339 in 769 households. The following census in 2011 counted 3,414 people in 941 households. The 2016 census measured the population of the village as 3,240 people in 984 households. It was the most populous village in its rural district.
