= Gurab Zarmikh =

City in Gilan province, Iran

Gurab Zarmikh Persian: گوراب زرميخ
- City
- Location within Iran
- Coordinates: 37°18′13″N 49°13′11″E
- Country: Iran
- Province: Gilan
- County: Sowme'eh Sara
- District: Mirza Kuchek Janghli
- Established as a city: 1999

Population (2016)
  - Total: 4,840
- Time zone: UTC+3:30 (IRST)

Gurab Zarmikh (Persian: گوراب زرميخ) (Note: Also romanized as Gūrāb Zarmīkh; also known as Gūrāb Zarmakh, Gūrāb Zarmanj, and Kurab-Zermakh) is a city in, and the capital of, Mirza Kuchek Janghli District in Sowme'eh Sara County, Gilan province, Iran. It also serves as the administrative center for Gurab Zarmikh Rural District. The village of Gurab Zarmikh was converted to a city in 1999.

== Demographics ==
=== Population ===
At the time of the 2006 National Census, the city's population was 4,183 in 1,097 households. The following census in 2011 counted 4,588 people in 1,404 households. The 2016 census measured the population of the city as 4,840 people in 1,610 households.
