= Pain Bolgur =

Village in Gilan province, Iran

Pain Bolgur Persian: پايين بلگور
- Village
- Location within Iran
- Coordinates: 37°19′17″N 49°16′21″E
- Country: Iran
- Province: Gilan
- County: Sowme'eh Sara
- District: Mirza Kuchek Janghli
- Rural District: Markiyeh

Population (2016)
  - Total: 246
- Time zone: UTC+3:30 (IRST)

Pain Bolgur (Persian: پايين بلگور) (Note: Also romanized as Pā’īn Bolgūr; also known as Pā’īn Bowlgūr) is a village in Markiyeh Rural District of Mirza Kuchek Janghli District in Sowme'eh Sara County, Gilan province, Iran.

== Demographics ==
=== Population ===
At the time of the 2006 National Census, the village's population was 390 in 112 households. The following census in 2011 counted 278 people in 95 households. The 2016 census measured the population of the village as 246 people in 92 households.
