= Gyaspur =

- village
- Location in Uttar Pradesh, India
- Coordinates: 28°51′35″N 77°27′26″E
- Country: India
- State: Uttar Pradesh
- District: Ghaziabad

Population
  - Total: 3,000

Languages
  - Official: Hindi
- Time zone: UTC+5:30 (IST)
- Vehicle registration: UP-
- Coastline: 0 kilometres (0 mi)
- Nearest city: Muradnagar
- Lok Sabha constituency: Ghaziabad

Gyaspur is a hamlet in western Uttar Pradesh, India. The main caste of the village is Tyagi. The village made tremendous sacrifices towards the struggle for Indian freedom. In 1857, the people of this village were persecuted by the British for participating in the rebellion which resulted in the lynching of 5 horse-driven British officers, who came to the village to subdue the rebellion. In retribution for the death of 5 British officers, without actual knowledge of their killers, British rulers imposed harsh sanctions resulting in severe hardship for the inhabitants of Gyaspur and 4 other surrounding villages: Kumheda, Khindora, Bhaneda, and Suhana. As a result, the villagers suffered tremendously for almost a century until the country gained independence. The village is well known in the local area. Mr. Vinesh Tyagi is the current Pradhan of the village.
