= Balisana =

Village in Patan district of Gujarat, India

- Village
- Location within Gujarat Location within India
- Coordinates: 23.816436°N 72.257536°E
- Country: India
- State: Gujarat
- District: Patan district
- City: Patan
- Postal code: 384110
- ISO 3166 code: IN-GJ
- Website: gujaratindia.com

Balisana is a village in Patan district, state of Gujarat, India.
