= Markiyeh Rural District =

Rural district in Gilan province, Iran

Markiyeh Rural District Persian: دهستان مركيه
- Rural District
- Location within Iran
- Coordinates: 37°18′N 49°16′E
- Country: Iran
- Province: Gilan
- County: Sowme'eh Sara
- District: Mirza Kuchek Janghli
- Established: 1987
- Capital: Markiyeh

Population (2016)
  - Total: 3,525
- Time zone: UTC+3:30 (IRST)

Markiyeh Rural District (Persian: دهستان مركيه) is in Mirza Kuchek Janghli District of Sowme'eh Sara County, Gilan province, Iran. Its capital is the village of Markiyeh.

== Demographics ==
=== Population ===
At the time of the 2006 National Census, the rural district's population was 5,007 in 1,363 households. There were 4,165 inhabitants in 1,264 households at the following census of 2011. The 2016 census measured the population of the rural district as 3,525 in 1,245 households. The most populous of its nine villages was Markiyeh, with 1,117 people.

=== Other villages in the rural district ===
- Bala Bolgur
- Kherf
- Pain Bolgur
- Pord-e Sar
- Posht Mesar
- Seh Shanbeh
- Siah Estalkh
