= Koth, Ahmedabad =

Koth
- Village
- Location in Gujarat, India Koth (India)
- Coordinates: 22.636°N 72.3°E
- Country: India
- State: Gujarat
- District: Ahmedabad
- Taluka: Dholka

Government
  - Type: Gram Panchayat
  - Body: Gram Panchayat
- Elevation: 21 m (69 ft)

Population (2011)
  - Total: 10,439

Languages
  - Official: Gujarati
- Time zone: UTC+5:30 (IST)
- Vehicle registration: GJ 38
- Website: koth-dholka-ahd.panchayatgujarat.gov.in

Koth is a village in Ahmedabad district of Gujarat, India. It is located in the Dholka taluka.

According to 2011 census of India, the population is 10,439.
