= Bhadarva =

Coordinates: 22°31′N 73°08′E

Bhadarva (Bhadarwa) is a village in Savli Taluka in Vadodara District of Gujarat, India.

== Geography ==
Bhadarva is on the banks of the Mahi (Mahisagar) River, 27 km north of the district headquarters at Vadodara. 13 km from Savli, and 108 km from the state capital Gandhinagar.

== People ==
Gujarati is the local language.

In 1880, there were more than 3,000 people living in Bhadarva. By 1951, the population was below 5,000. In 2001, there were about 6,000 people living here.

As per the 2011 census, the total number of households is 1253 and the total population is 5951, of which 3069 are male and 2882 are female.
