= Mirza Kuchek Janghli District =

District in Gilan province, Iran

Mirza Kuchek Janghli District Persian: بخش میرزا کوچک جنگلی
- District
- Location within Iran
- Coordinates: 37°18′N 49°10′E
- Country: Iran
- Province: Gilan
- County: Sowme'eh Sara
- Established: 1994
- Capital: Gurab Zarmikh

Population (2016)
  - Total: 21,139
- Time zone: UTC+3:30 (IRST)

Mirza Kuchek Janghli District (Persian: بخش میرزا کوچک جنگلی) is in Sowme'eh Sara County, Gilan province, Iran. Its capital is the city of Gurab Zarmikh.

== Demographics ==
=== Population ===
At the time of the 2006 National Census, the district's population was 24,862 in 6,379 households. The following census in 2011 counted 23,086 people in 6,857 households. The 2016 census measured the population of the district as 21,139 inhabitants in 7,014 households.

=== Administrative divisions ===
Mirza Kuchek Janghli District Population
Administrative Divisions	2006	2011	2016
Gurab Zarmikh RD	15,672	14,333	12,774
Markiyeh RD	5,007	4,165	3,525
Gurab Zarmikh (city)	4,183	4,588	4,840
Total	24,862	23,086	21,139
RD = Rural District
