= Avatar (disambiguation) =

Avatar is a concept in Hinduism representing a material manifestation of a deity.

Avatar(s) or The Avatar(s) may also refer to:

== Books and print media ==
- Avatar (novel), an 1856 novel by Théophile Gautier
- Avatar (newspaper), a Boston underground newspaper (1967–1968), last owned by the Mel Lyman Family
- The Avatar, a novel by Poul Anderson (1978)
- Avatar Press, a comic book publisher
- Avatars (series), a trilogy of fantasy novels by Tui T. Sutherland
- The Avatar Series, a series of fantasy novels set in the Forgotten Realms
- Avatar, two novels of the Star Trek: Deep Space Nine relaunch
- Avatar, a character in God's Debris and The Religion War by Scott Adams
- Avatar, a novel by John Passarella set in the fictional universe of the television series Angel
- The Avatars, a fictional race in David Gemmell's Echoes of the Great Song

== Film and television ==
=== Film ===
- Avatar (1916 film), an Italian film directed by Carmine Gallone
- Avatar, a character in the Ralph Bakshi film Wizards (1977)
- Avatar (2004 film), a Singaporean film starring Genevieve O'Reilly
- Avatar (franchise), the science fiction franchise directed by James Cameron that includes the following films:
  - Avatar (2009 film), the first film of the franchise
  - Avatar: The Way of Water, the second film of the franchise
  - Avatar: Fire and Ash, the third film of the franchise
  - Avatar 4, the fourth film, in development, of the franchise
- The Last Airbender (film), a 2010 film based on the TV series Avatar: The Last Airbender

=== Television ===
- Avatar: The Last Airbender, a 2005 animated television series that aired on Nickelodeon
  - Avatar: The Last Airbender (franchise), the franchise that started with the above series
  - Avatar: The Last Airbender (2024 TV series), a live-action adaptation of the animated series
- "Avatar" (Batman: The Animated Series), an episode of Batman: The Animated Series
- "Avatar" (Stargate SG-1), an episode of Stargate SG-1
- "Avatar" (The X-Files), an episode of The X-Files
- Avatars (Carnivàle), a fictional race of creatures in Carnivàle
- Avatars (Charmed), a fictional group of beings in Charmed
- "Avatar", an episode of the television series Highlander: The Series
- Avatar, a fictional golden sword in the television series Encantadia
- The Avatar, a character in the Ōban Star-Racers universe
- "Captain Avatar", a character in the Space Battleship Yamato (Star Blazers) universe

== Games ==
- Avatar (PLATO system video game), a 1979 computer role-playing game
- AVATAR (MUD), a fantasy online role-playing game
- Avatar: The Last Airbender (video game)
- Avatar: The Last Airbender Trading Card Game
- Avatar: Legends of the Arena, a 2008 video game for Microsoft Windows by Nickelodeon
- James Cameron's Avatar: The Game, an adaptation of the 2009 film
- Avatar (Ultima), the main character in the Ultima game series
- Avatar (Xbox), a service that allows users to create graphical avatars
- Avatar: Frontiers of Pandora, a 2023 open-world action-adventure video game based on James Cameron's Avatar film series

== Music ==
- Avatar (Swedish band), a Swedish melodic death metal band
- Avatar (Avatar album), the third album released by Swedish metal band Avatar
- Avatar (Angels and Agony album)
- Avatar (Comets on Fire album)
- Avatar Records, an American independent record label
- Avatar Records (electronic music), an Israeli record label
- Savatage or Avatar, an American heavy metal band
- "(Do You Wanna Date My) Avatar", a song by the cast of The Guild
- Avatar, a box set by Pete Townshend, benefitting the Avatar Meher Baba Trust
- "Avatar", a song by Dead Can Dance from Spleen and Ideal
- "Avatar", a song by Manilla Road from Mark of the Beast
- "Avatar", a song by The Swans from The Seer

== Other uses ==
- Avatar (computing), the graphical representation of a user, also known as profile picture
- Avatar (horse), an American racehorse
- Avatar (spacecraft), a conceptual spaceplane planned by India's Defense Research and Development Organization as well as Indian Space Research Organization, among others
- Avatar, Iran, a village in Qazvin Province, Iran
- Avatar Recording Studios, a recording studio in New York City
- Avatar Technologies, a defunct American computer systems company based in Massachusetts
- Avatar Systems, a defunct American computer storage company based in California
- ARP Avatar, a guitar synthesizer
- Avatar Course, a series of LGAT self-development courses
- Avatar, a superuser on some Unix operating systems
- Avatar, a wrestling gimmick portrayed by American professional wrestler Al Snow
- AVATAR or A Virtual Astronaut Tissue Analog Response, an experiment on the Artemis II mission
- Ikrandraco avatar, a species of pterosaur
- Ommatoiulus avatar, a species of millipede

== See also ==
- Avatar: The Last Airbender (disambiguation)
- Avatharam (disambiguation), alternative transliteration of avatar
- Avatara Purusha (disambiguation)
- Avtaar, a 1983 Indian film starring Rajesh Khanna
- Avataran, an Indian Assamese-language film
- Abtar (disambiguation)
- Abatar (film), a 1941 Indian Bengali-language film
- Avtar, an Indian male given name
- Incarnation
