= Sharam (disambiguation) =

Sharam may refer to:

== Places ==
- Sharam, Iran, a village

== People ==
- Sharam Tayebi is an Iranian-American progressive house DJ and producer.
- Max Sharam (born 1969), Australian interdisciplinary artist and singer-songwriter
- Mohammed Sharam, the only surviving perpetrator of the 1985 Rome and Vienna airport attacks

== Art, entertainment, and media ==
- Sharam (film) (1982), an Indian film

== See also ==
- Saram (disambiguation)
- Besharam (disambiguation)
- Sarum (disambiguation)
- Sharam Q, a Japanese rock band
