= Abtar =

Abtar may refer to:

- Abtar, Khuzestan, Iran
- Abtar, Sistan and Baluchestan, Iran
- Abtar Rural District, Sistan and Baluchestan Province, Iran

== See also ==
- Avatar (disambiguation)
- Abatar, village in Gilan Province, Iran
- Abatar Rural District, Gilan Province, Iran
- Abatar (film), a 1941 Indian Bengali-language film
- Abtar Singh Paintal (1924–2005), an Indian medical scientist
