= Molla Sara, Sowme'eh Sara =

Village in Gilan province, Iran

Molla Sara Persian: ملاسرا
- Village
- Location within Iran
- Country: Iran
- Province: Gilan
- County: Sowme'eh Sara
- District: Taher Gurab
- Rural District: Abatar

Population (2016)
  - Total: 154
- Time zone: UTC+3:30 (IRST)

Molla Sara (Persian: ملاسرا) (Note: Also romanized as Mollā Sarā) is a village in Abatar Rural District of Taher Gurab District in Sowme'eh Sara County, Gilan province, Iran.

== Demographics ==
=== Population ===
At the time of the 2006 National Census, the village's population was 247 in 76 households, when it was in Taher Gurab Rural District of the Central District. The following census in 2011 counted 185 people in 60 households. The 2016 census measured the population of the village as 154 people in 54 households.

In 2021, the rural district was separated from the district in the formation of Taher Gurab District. Molla Sara was transferred to Abatar Rural District created in the new district.
