= Khoshtamdokh =

Village in Gilan province, Iran

Khoshtamdokh Persian: خشتامدخ
- Village
- Location within Iran
- Coordinates: 37°21′42″N 49°14′44″E
- Country: Iran
- Province: Gilan
- County: Sowme'eh Sara
- District: Taher Gurab
- Rural District: Abatar

Population (2016)
  - Total: 71
- Time zone: UTC+3:30 (IRST)

Khoshtamdokh (Persian: خشتامدخ) (Note: Also romanized as Khashtāmdakh and Khoshtāmdokh) is a village in Abatar Rural District of Taher Gurab District in Sowme'eh Sara County, Gilan province, Iran.

== Demographics ==
=== Population ===
At the time of the 2006 National Census, the village's population was 136 in 30 households, when it was in Taher Gurab Rural District of the Central District. The following census in 2011 counted 72 people in 21 households. The 2016 census measured the population of the village as 71 people in 26 households.

In 2021, the rural district was separated from the district in the formation of Taher Gurab District. Khoshtamdokh was transferred to Abatar Rural District created in the new district.
