= Menareh Bazar =

Village in Gilan province, Iran

Menareh Bazar Persian: مناره بازار
- Village
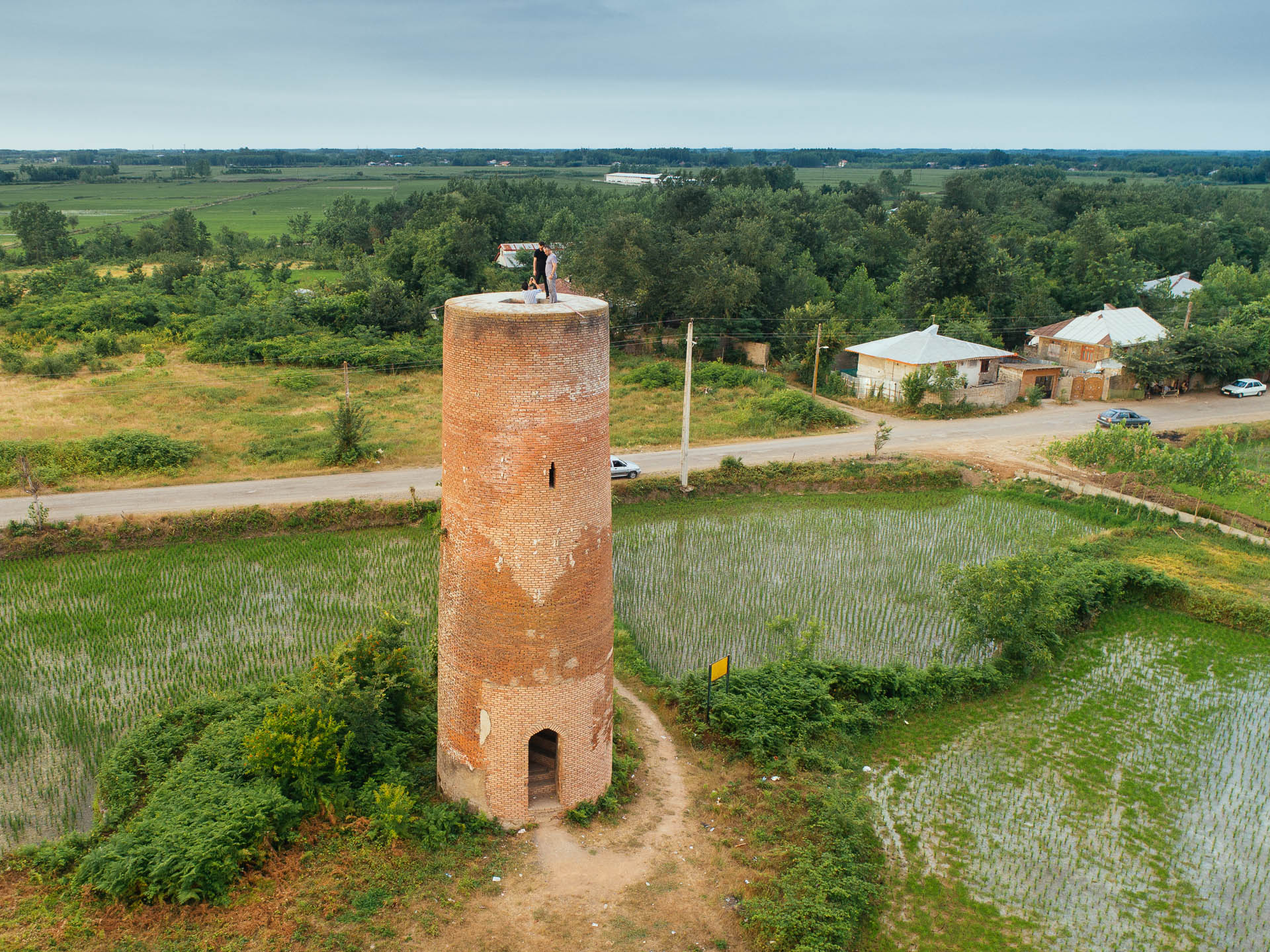
- Monument in the village of Menareh Bazar

- Location within Iran
- Coordinates: 37°20′53″N 49°14′44″E
- Country: Iran
- Province: Gilan
- County: Sowme'eh Sara
- District: Taher Gurab
- Rural District: Abatar

Population (2016)
  - Total: 287
- Time zone: UTC+3:30 (IRST)

Menareh Bazar (Persian: مناره بازار) (Note: Also romanized as Menāreh Bāzār; also known as Minar-Bazar) is a village in Abatar Rural District of Taher Gurab District in Sowme'eh Sara County, Gilan province, Iran.

== Demographics ==
=== Population ===
At the time of the 2006 National Census, the village's population was 404 in 118 households, when it was in Taher Gurab Rural District of the Central District. The following census in 2011 counted 331 people in 105 households. The 2016 census measured the population of the village as 287 people in 102 households.

In 2021, the rural district was separated from the district in the formation of Taher Gurab District. Menareh Bazar was transferred to Abatar Rural District created in the new district.
