= Shekar Baghan =

Village in Gilan province, Iran

Shekar Baghan Persian: شكرباغان
- Village
- Location within Iran
- Coordinates: 37°23′17″N 49°17′06″E
- Country: Iran
- Province: Gilan
- County: Sowme'eh Sara
- District: Taher Gurab
- Rural District: Abatar

Population (2016)
  - Total: 39
- Time zone: UTC+3:30 (IRST)

Shekar Baghan (Persian: شكرباغان) (Note: Also romanized as Shekar Bāghān; also known as Shafar-Baga) is a village in Abatar Rural District of Taher Gurab District in Sowme'eh Sara County, Gilan province, Iran.

== Demographics ==
=== Population ===
At the time of the 2006 National Census, the village's population was 107 in 38 households, when it was in Taher Gurab Rural District of the Central District. The following census in 2011 counted 73 people in 27 households. The 2016 census measured the population of the village as 39 people in 18 households.

In 2021, the rural district was separated from the district in the formation of Taher Gurab District. Shekar Baghan was transferred to Abatar Rural District created in the new district.
