= Poshtir, Taher Gurab =

Village in Gilan province, Iran

Poshtir Persian: پشتير
- Village
- Location within Iran
- Coordinates: 37°24′16″N 49°14′22″E
- Country: Iran
- Province: Gilan
- County: Sowme'eh Sara
- District: Taher Gurab
- Rural District: Taher Gurab

Population (2016)
  - Total: 211
- Time zone: UTC+3:30 (IRST)

Poshtir (Persian: پشتير) (Note: Also romanized as Poshtīr; also known as Poshtīr-e Bālā) is a village in Taher Gurab Rural District of Taher Gurab District in Sowme'eh Sara County, Gilan province, Iran.

== Demographics ==
=== Population ===
At the time of the 2006 National Census, the village's population was 338 in 104 households, when it was in the Central District. The following census in 2011 counted 267 people in 103 households. The 2016 census measured the population of the village as 211 people in 90 households.

In 2021, the rural district was separated from the district in the formation of Taher Gurab District.
