= Patavan =

Village in Gilan province, Iran

Patavan Persian: پاتاوان
- Village
- Location within Iran
- Coordinates: 37°22′18″N 49°13′46″E
- Country: Iran
- Province: Gilan
- County: Sowme'eh Sara
- District: Taher Gurab
- Rural District: Taher Gurab

Population (2016)
  - Total: 176
- Time zone: UTC+3:30 (IRST)

Patavan (Persian: پاتاوان) (Note: Also romanized as Pātāvān) is a village in Taher Gurab Rural District of Taher Gurab District in Sowme'eh Sara County, Gilan province, Iran.

== Demographics ==
=== Population ===
At the time of the 2006 National Census, the village's population was 206 in 60 households, when it was in the Central District. The following census in 2011 counted 186 people in 62 households. The 2016 census measured the population of the village as 176 people in 61 households.

In 2021, the rural district was separated from the district in the formation of Taher Gurab District.
