= Chaman, Gilan =

Village in Gilan province, Iran

Chaman Persian: چمن
- Village
- Location within Iran
- Coordinates: 37°21′02″N 49°14′00″E
- Country: Iran
- Province: Gilan
- County: Sowme'eh Sara
- District: Taher Gurab
- Rural District: Taher Gurab

Population (2016)
  - Total: 268
- Time zone: UTC+3:30 (IRST)

Chaman (Persian: چمن) is a village in Taher Gurab Rural District of Taher Gurab District in Sowme'eh Sara County, Gilan province, Iran.

== Demographics ==
=== Population ===
At the time of the 2006 National Census, the village's population was 348 in 76 households, when it was in the Central District. The following census in 2011 counted 300 people in 81 households. The 2016 census measured the population of the village as 268 people in 93 households.

In 2021, the rural district was separated from the district in the formation of Taher Gurab District.
