= Spermatheca =

Invertebrate female reproductive organ

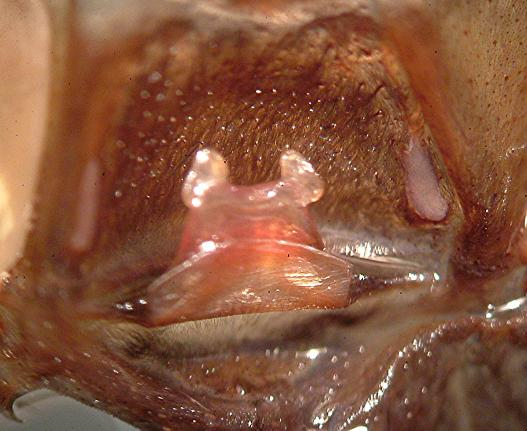
Spermatheca of Acanthoscurria geniculata (Brazilian Giant White Knee Tarantula)

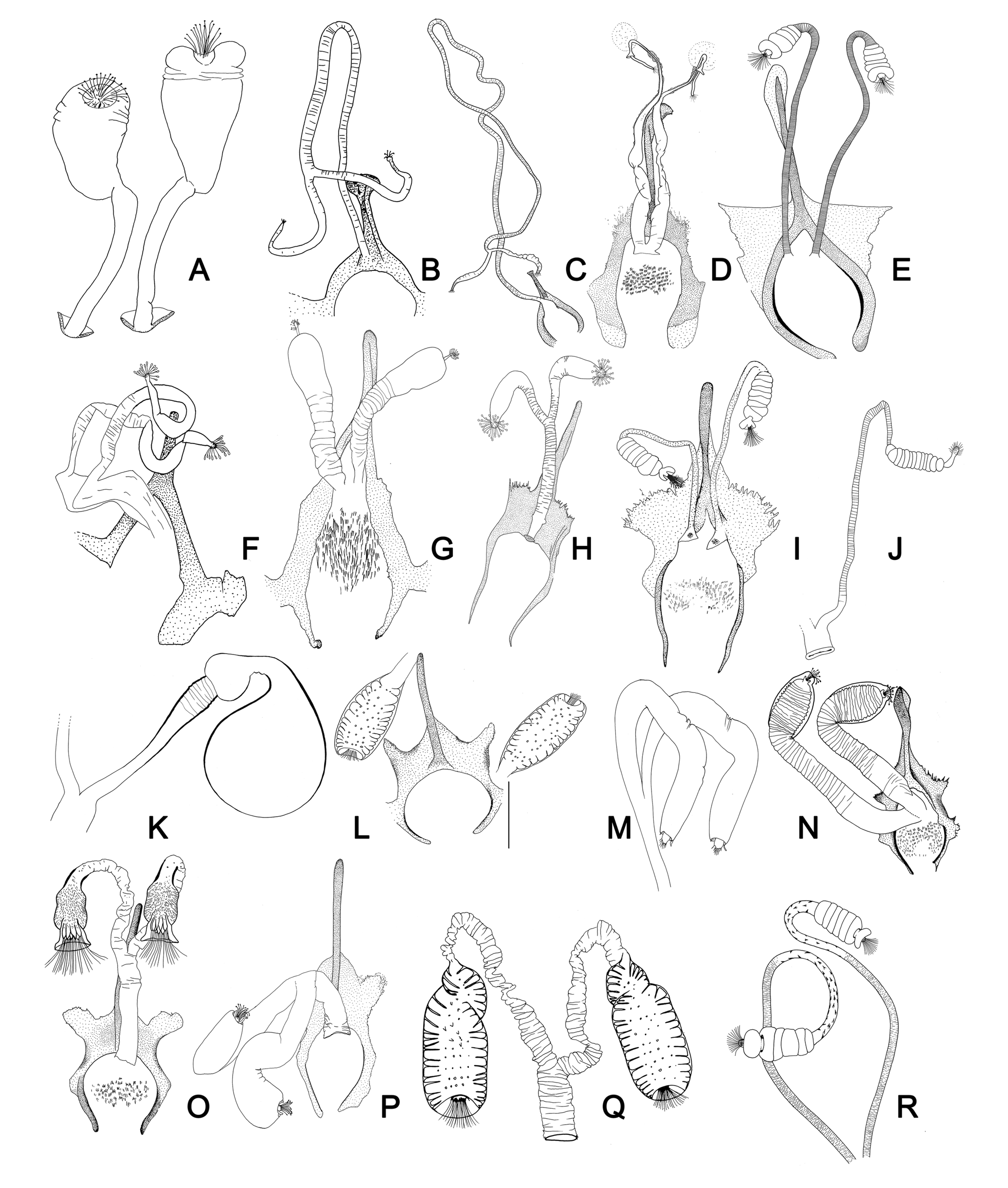
Variety of the structure of spermathecae in Phlebotominae (Diptera, Psychodidae)

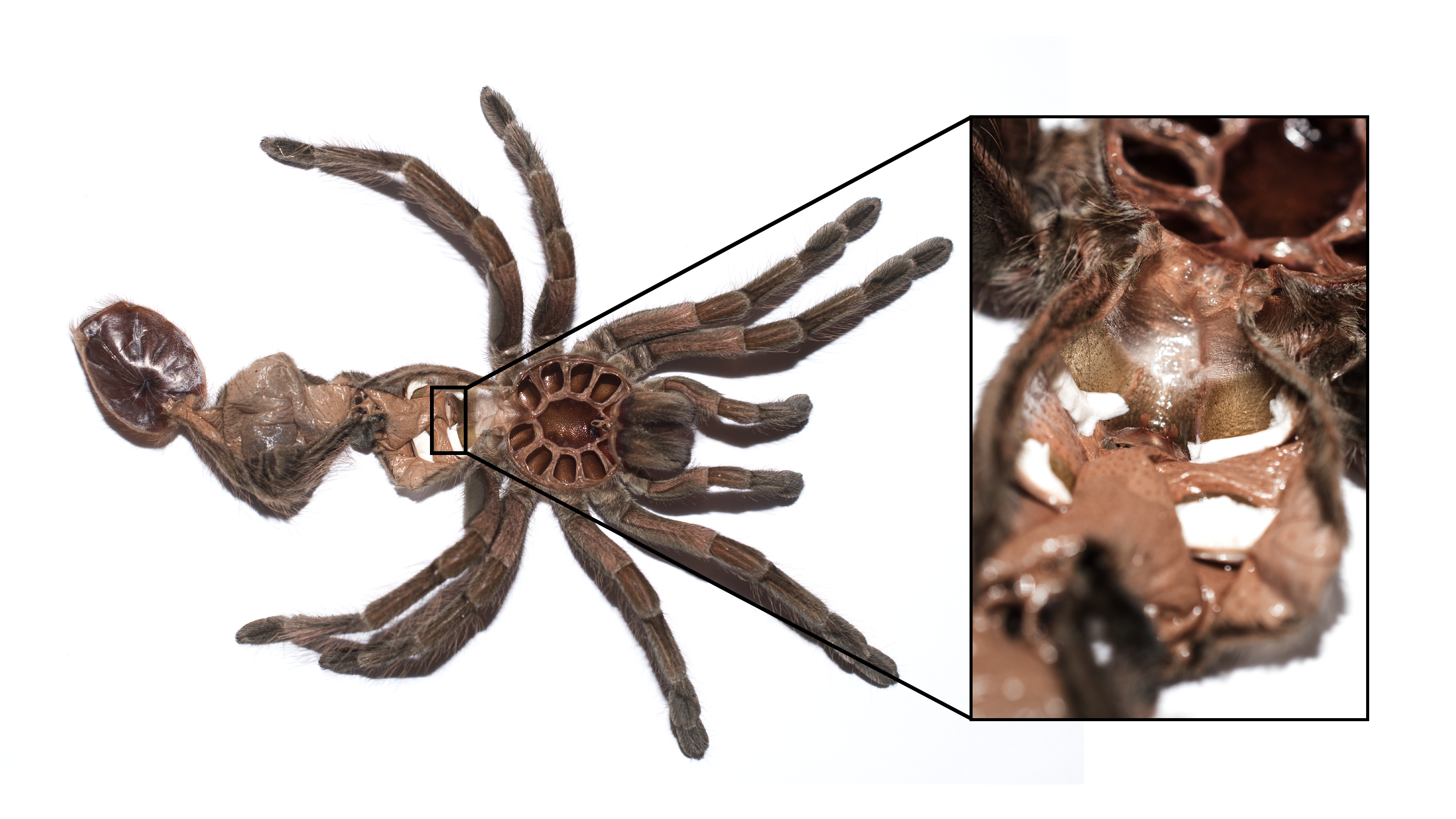
Female tarantula molt

The spermatheca (pronounced /spərməˈθiːkə/ pl.: spermathecae /spərməˈθiːsiː/), also called receptaculum seminis (pl.: receptacula seminis), is an organ of the female reproductive tract in insects, e.g. ants, bees, some molluscs, Oligochaeta worms and certain other invertebrates and vertebrates. Its purpose is to receive and store sperm from the male or, in the case of hermaphrodites, the male component of the body. Spermathecae can sometimes be the site of fertilisation when the oocytes are sufficiently developed.

Some species of animal have multiple spermathecae. For example, certain species of earthworms have four pairs of spermathecae—one pair each in the 6th, 7th, 8th, and 9th segments. The spermathecae receive and store the spermatozoa of another earthworm during copulation. They are lined with epithelium and are variable in shape: some are thin, heavily coiled tubes, while others are vague outpocketings from the main reproductive tract. It is one of the many variations in sexual reproduction.

The nematode Caenorhabditis elegans has two spermathecae, one at the end of each gonad. The C. elegans spermatheca is made up of 24 smooth muscle-like cells that form a stretchable tubular structure. Actin filaments line the spermatheca in a circumferential manner. The C. elegans spermatheca is used as a model to study mechanotransduction.

An apiculturist may examine the spermatheca of a dead queen bee to determine whether it had received sperm from a male. In many species of stingless bees, especially Melipona bicolor, the queen lays her eggs during the provisioning and oviposition process and the spermatheca fertilizes the egg as it passes along the oviduct. The haplo-diploid system of sex determination makes it possible for the queen to choose the sex of the egg.

== See also ==
- Cyphopods, sperm receptacles in female millipedes
- Female sperm storage
- Reproductive system of gastropods
