= Mahmud Kian =

Village in Gilan province, Iran

Mahmud Kian Persian: محمودكيان
- Village
- Location within Iran
- Coordinates: 37°22′47″N 49°12′43″E
- Country: Iran
- Province: Gilan
- County: Sowme'eh Sara
- District: Taher Gurab
- Rural District: Taher Gurab

Population (2016)
  - Total: 318
- Time zone: UTC+3:30 (IRST)

Mahmud Kian (Persian: محمودكيان) (Note: Also romanized as Maḩmūd Kīān) is a village in Taher Gurab Rural District of Taher Gurab District in Sowme'eh Sara County, Gilan province, Iran.

== Demographics ==
=== Population ===
At the time of the 2006 National Census, the village's population was 397 in 109 households, when it was in the Central District. The following census in 2011 counted 371 people in 114 households. The 2016 census measured the population of the village as 318 people in 116 households.

In 2021, the rural district was separated from the district in the formation of Taher Gurab District.
