= Now Kasht =

Village in Gilan province, Iran

Now Kasht Persian: نوكاشت
- Village
- Location within Iran
- Coordinates: 37°22′06″N 49°11′21″E
- Country: Iran
- Province: Gilan
- County: Sowme'eh Sara
- District: Taher Gurab
- Rural District: Taher Gurab

Population (2016)
  - Total: 646
- Time zone: UTC+3:30 (IRST)

Now Kasht (Persian: نوكاشت) (Note: Also romanized as Now Kāsht) is a village in, and the capital of, Taher Gurab Rural District in Taher Gurab District of Sowme'eh Sara County, Gilan province, Iran. The previous capital of the rural district was the village of Taher Gurab, now a city.

== Demographics ==
=== Population ===
At the time of the 2006 National Census, the village's population was 859 in 226 households, when it was in the Central District. The following census in 2011 counted 812 people in 234 households. The 2016 census measured the population of the village as 646 people in 222 households.

In 2021, the rural district was separated from the district in the formation of Taher Gurab District.
