= Rajir =

Village in Gilan province, Iran

Rajir Persian: راجير
- Village
- Location within Iran
- Country: Iran
- Province: Gilan
- County: Sowme'eh Sara
- District: Taher Gurab
- Rural District: Taher Gurab

Population (2016)
  - Total: 295
- Time zone: UTC+3:30 (IRST)

Rajir (Persian: راجير) (Note: Also romanized as Rājīr) is a village in Taher Gurab Rural District of Taher Gurab District in Sowme'eh Sara County, Gilan province, Iran.

== Demographics ==
=== Population ===
At the time of the 2006 National Census, the village's population was 308 in 89 households, when it was in the Central District. The following census in 2011 counted 286 people in 84 households. The 2016 census measured the population of the village as 295 people in 96 households.

In 2021, the rural district was separated from the district in the formation of Taher Gurab District.
