= Moaf-e Owmandan =

Village in Gilan province, Iran

Moaf-e Owmandan Persian: معاف اومندان
- Village
- Location within Iran
- Coordinates: 37°24′09″N 49°16′16″E
- Country: Iran
- Province: Gilan
- County: Sowme'eh Sara
- District: Taher Gurab
- Rural District: Taher Gurab

Population (2016)
  - Total: 99
- Time zone: UTC+3:30 (IRST)

Moaf-e Owmandan (Persian: معاف اومندان) (Note: Also romanized as Mo‘āf Owmandān; formerly known as Moaf Amandan (معاف امندان), also romanized as Mo‘āf Amandān) is a village in Taher Gurab Rural District of Taher Gurab District in Sowme'eh Sara County, Gilan province, Iran.

== Demographics ==
=== Population ===
At the time of the 2006 National Census, the village's population, as Moaf Amandan, was 211 in 72 households, when it was in the Central District. The following census in 2011 counted 133 people in 51 households, by which time the village was listed as Moaf-e Owmandan. The 2016 census measured the population of the village as 99 people in 43 households.

In 2021, the rural district was separated from the district in the formation of Taher Gurab District.
