= Fatmeh Sar =

Village in Gilan province, Iran

Fatmeh Sar Persian: فتمه سر
- Village
- Location within Iran
- Coordinates: 37°23′44″N 49°19′31″E
- Country: Iran
- Province: Gilan
- County: Sowme'eh Sara
- District: Taher Gurab
- Rural District: Abatar

Population (2016)
  - Total: 193
- Time zone: UTC+3:30 (IRST)

Fatmeh Sar (Persian: فتمه سر) (Note: Also known as Fatmeh Sarā) is a village in Abatar Rural District of Taher Gurab District in Sowme'eh Sara County, Gilan province, Iran.

== Demographics ==
=== Population ===
At the time of the 2006 National Census, the village's population was 317 in 96 households, when it was in the Central District. The following census in 2011 counted 235 people in 78 households. The 2016 census measured the population of the village as 193 people in 73 households.

In 2021, Fatmeh Sar was transferred to Abatar Rural District created in Taher Gurab District.
