= Zarkam =

Village in Gilan province, Iran

Zarkam Persian: زركام
- Village
- Location within Iran
- Coordinates: 37°21′40″N 49°16′17″E
- Country: Iran
- Province: Gilan
- County: Sowme'eh Sara
- District: Taher Gurab
- Rural District: Abatar

Population (2016)
  - Total: 471
- Time zone: UTC+3:30 (IRST)

Zarkam (Persian: زركام) (Note: Also romanized as Zarkām; also known as Zar Kalām) is a village in Abatar Rural District of Taher Gurab District in Sowme'eh Sara County, Gilan province, Iran.

== Demographics ==
=== Population ===
At the time of the 2006 National Census, the village's population was 585 in 162 households, when it was in Kasma Rural District of the Central District. The following census in 2011 counted 557 people in 174 households. The 2016 census measured the population of the village as 471 people in 173 households.

In 2021, the rural district was separated from the district in the formation of Taher Gurab District. Zarkam was transferred to Abatar Rural District created in the new district.
