= Kelid Bar, Sowme'eh Sara =

Village in Gilan province, Iran

Kelid Bar Persian: كليدبر
- Village
- Location within Iran
- Coordinates: 37°22′44″N 49°15′09″E
- Country: Iran
- Province: Gilan
- County: Sowme'eh Sara
- District: Taher Gurab
- Rural District: Abatar

Population (2016)
  - Total: 549
- Time zone: UTC+3:30 (IRST)

Abatar (Persian: اباتر) (Note: Also romanized as Abātar and Abāter) is a village in Abatar Rural District of Taher Gurab District in Sowme'eh Sara County, Gilan province, Iran.

== Demographics ==
=== Population ===
At the time of the 2006 National Census, the village's population was 633 in 172 households, when it was in Taher Gurab Rural District of the Central District. The following census in 2011 counted 595 people in 191 households. The 2016 census measured the population of the village as 549 people in 202 households.

In 2021, the rural district was separated from the district in the formation of Taher Gurab District. Kelid Bar was transferred to Abatar Rural District created in the new district.
