= Khaneh Kenar =

Village in Gilan province, Iran

Khaneh Kenar Persian: خانه كنار
- Village
- Location within Iran
- Coordinates: 37°23′22″N 49°11′19″E
- Country: Iran
- Province: Gilan
- County: Sowme'eh Sara
- District: Taher Gurab
- Rural District: Taher Gurab

Population (2016)
  - Total: 264
- Time zone: UTC+3:30 (IRST)

Khaneh Kenar (Persian: خانه كنار) (Note: Also romanized as Khāneh Kenār; also known as Khānī Kenār) is a village in Taher Gurab Rural District of Taher Gurab District in Sowme'eh Sara County, Gilan province, Iran.

== Demographics ==
=== Population ===
At the time of the 2006 National Census, the village's population was 341 in 105 households, when it was in the Central District. The following census in 2011 counted 315 people in 100 households. The 2016 census measured the population of the village as 264 people in 86 households.

In 2021, the rural district was separated from the district in the formation of Taher Gurab District.
