= Jadeh Kenar =

Village in Gilan province, Iran

Jadeh Kenar Persian: جاده كنار
- Village
- Location within Iran
- Coordinates: 37°21′48″N 49°13′43″E
- Country: Iran
- Province: Gilan
- County: Sowme'eh Sara
- District: Taher Gurab
- Rural District: Taher Gurab

Population (2016)
  - Total: 204
- Time zone: UTC+3:30 (IRST)

Jadeh Kenar (Persian: جاده كنار) (Note: Also romanized as Jādeh Kenār) is a village in Taher Gurab Rural District of Taher Gurab District in Sowme'eh Sara County, Gilan province, Iran.

== Demographics ==
=== Population ===
At the time of the 2006 National Census, the village's population was 249 in 68 households, when it was in the Central District. The following census in 2011 counted 234 people in 77 households. The 2016 census measured the population of the village as 204 people in 73 households.

In 2021, the rural district was separated from the district in the formation of Taher Gurab District.
