= Saram =

Saram or Sarem (Persian: صرم or سارم) may refer to:

- Sarem, Gilan (سارم - Sārem)
- Saram, Mazandaran (سارم - Sāram)
- Saram, Qom (صرم - Şaram)

Saram may also refer to:

- Saram, Bokaro, a census town in Jharkhand, India
- Michelle Saram, Singaporean actress, singer and businesswoman
- Saram Entertainment, South Korea entertainment company

== See also ==
- De Saram
- Sharam (disambiguation)
