= Molk Sar =

Village in Gilan province, Iran

Molk Sar Persian: ملك سر
- Village
- Location within Iran
- Coordinates: 37°22′43″N 49°10′23″E
- Country: Iran
- Province: Gilan
- County: Sowme'eh Sara
- District: Taher Gurab
- Rural District: Taher Gurab

Population (2016)
  - Total: 527
- Time zone: UTC+3:30 (IRST)

Molk Sar (Persian: ملك سر) (Note: Also romanized as Molk-e Sar; also known as Molk Sarā and Mul’kasar) is a village in Taher Gurab Rural District of Taher Gurab District in Sowme'eh Sara County, Gilan province, Iran.

== Demographics ==
=== Population ===
At the time of the 2006 National Census, the village's population was 680 in 172 households, when it was in the Central District. The following census in 2011 counted 622 people in 173 households. The 2016 census measured the population of the village as 527 people in 172 households.

In 2021, the rural district was separated from the district in the formation of Taher Gurab District.
