= Ziksar =

Village in Gilan province, Iran

Ziksar Persian: زيكسار
- Village
- Location within Iran
- Coordinates: 37°23′38″N 49°12′06″E
- Country: Iran
- Province: Gilan
- County: Sowme'eh Sara
- District: Taher Gurab
- Rural District: Taher Gurab

Population (2016)
  - Total: 319
- Time zone: UTC+3:30 (IRST)

Ziksar (Persian: زيكسار) (Note: Also romanized as Zīksār; also known as Rīksār) is a village in Taher Gurab Rural District of Taher Gurab District in Sowme'eh Sara County, Gilan province, Iran.

== Demographics ==
=== Population ===
At the time of the 2006 National Census, the village's population was 270 in 87 households, when it was in the Central District. The following census in 2011 counted 313 people in 103 households. The 2016 census measured the population of the village as 319 people in 120 households.

In 2021, the rural district was separated from the district in the formation of Taher Gurab District.
