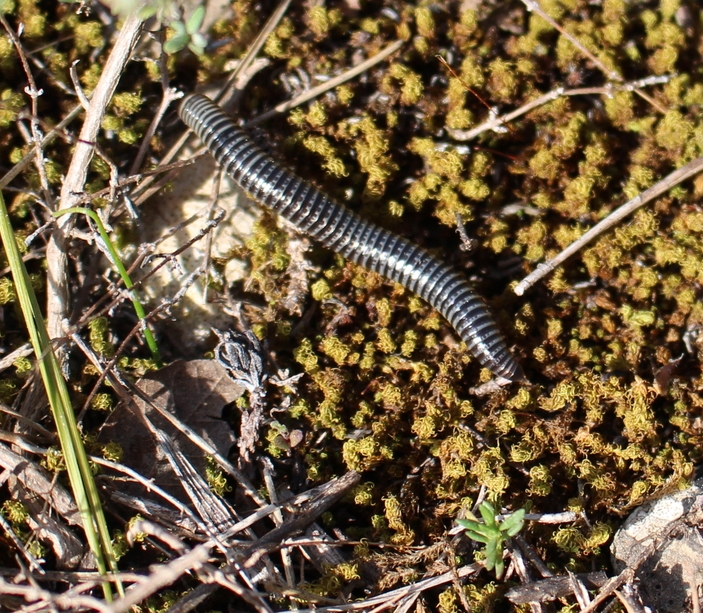

Scientific classification
- Kingdom: Animalia
- Phylum: Arthropoda
- Subphylum: Myriapoda
- Class: Diplopoda
- Order: Julida
- Family: Julidae
- Genus: Ommatoiulus
- Species: O. sabulosus
- Subspecies: O. s. aimatopodus

Trinomial name
- Ommatoiulus sabulosus aimatopodus (Risso, 1826)

Synonyms
- Julus aimatopodus Risso, 1826

= Ommatoiulus sabulosus aimatopodus =

Subspecies of millipede

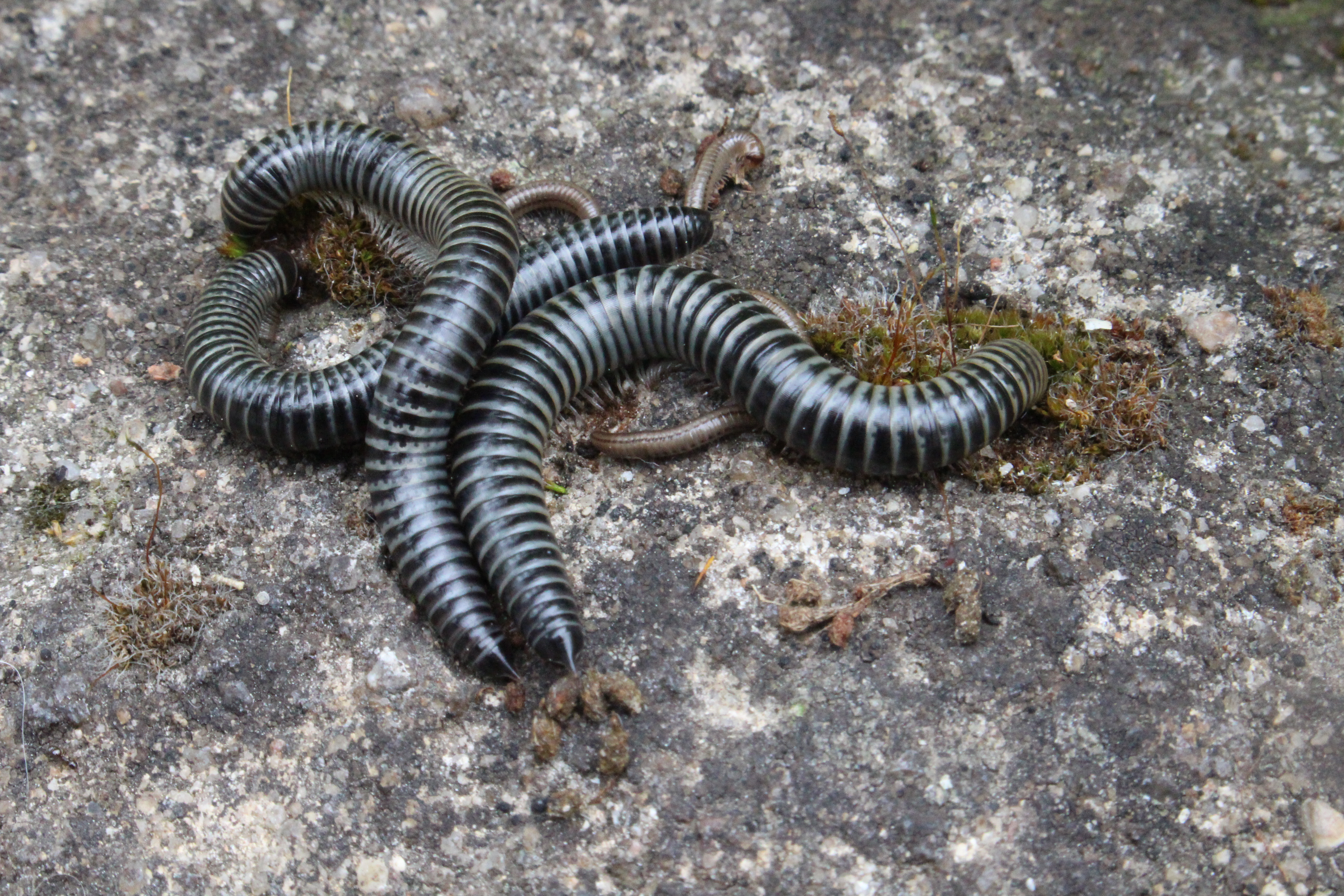
Juveniles, subadults and adults gathered on an old wall, after the rain. The juveniles are light brown, longitudinally stripped, as typical Ommatoiulus sabulosus, while subadults and adults exhibit the black and white ringed pattern characteristic of the forma.

Ommatoiulus sabulosus aimatopodus is a millipede occurring in the South of France; belonging to the same species than Ommatoiulus sabulosus, it differs from the type by the lack of lighter transversal lines on the back when adult. It is believed to be a Mediterranean-climate adapted variant, but whether it is a true subspecies or rather an ecomorph is unclear; first described by Antoine Risso as a distinct species, it is for now considered as a form of Ommatoiulus sabulosus, under the name Ommatoiulus sabulosus f. aimatopodus.

It has been shown that these millipede breed in autumn, and have shorter life cycle, compared to the northern Ommatoiulus sabulosus, that leads to the occurrence of only adults or old juveniles during the hot and dry summer season, believed to be an adaptation to that climate.
