= Kudeh, Gilan =

Village in Gilan province, Iran

Kudeh Persian: كوده
- Village
- Location within Iran
- Coordinates: 37°22′39″N 49°17′20″E
- Country: Iran
- Province: Gilan
- County: Sowme'eh Sara
- District: Taher Gurab
- Rural District: Abatar

Population (2016)
  - Total: 313
- Time zone: UTC+3:30 (IRST)

Kudeh (Persian: كوده) (Note: Also romanized as Kūdeh; also known as Do Ābsar) is a village in Abatar Rural District of Taher Gurab District in Sowme'eh Sara County, Gilan province, Iran.

== Demographics ==
=== Population ===
At the time of the 2006 National Census, the village's population was 475 in 158 households, when it was in Taher Gurab Rural District of the Central District. The following census in 2011 counted 351 people in 123 households. The 2016 census measured the population of the village as 313 people in 116 households.

In 2021, the rural district was separated from the district in the formation of Taher Gurab District. Kudeh was transferred to Abatar Rural District created in the new district.
