= Asiab Sar, Sowme'eh Sara =

Village in Gilan province, Iran

Asiab Sar Persian: اسياب سر
- Village
- Location within Iran
- Coordinates: 37°22′18″N 49°13′04″E
- Country: Iran
- Province: Gilan
- County: Sowme'eh Sara
- District: Taher Gurab
- Rural District: Taher Gurab

Population (2016)
  - Total: 315
- Time zone: UTC+3:30 (IRST)

Asiab Sar (Persian: اسياب سر) (Note: Also romanized as Āsīāb Sar) is a village in Taher Gurab Rural District of Taher Gurab District in Sowme'eh Sara County, Gilan province, Iran.

== Demographics ==
=== Population ===
At the time of the 2006 National Census, the village's population was 432 in 114 households, when it was in the Central District. The following census in 2011 counted 409 people in 116 households. The 2016 census measured the population of the village as 315 people in 110 households.

In 2021, the rural district was separated from the district in the formation of Taher Gurab District.
