= Kolangestan =

Village in Gilan province, Iran

Kolangestan Persian: كلنگستان
- Village
- Location within Iran
- Coordinates: 37°23′49″N 49°10′13″E
- Country: Iran
- Province: Gilan
- County: Sowme'eh Sara
- District: Taher Gurab
- Rural District: Taher Gurab

Population (2016)
  - Total: 658
- Time zone: UTC+3:30 (IRST)

Kolangestan (Persian: كلنگستان) (Note: Also romanized as Kalangestān and Kolangestān) is a village in Taher Gurab Rural District of Taher Gurab District in Sowme'eh Sara County, Gilan province, Iran.

== Demographics ==
=== Population ===
At the time of the 2006 National Census, the village's population was 851 in 246 households, when it was in the Central District. The following census in 2011 counted 862 people in 259 households. The 2016 census measured the population of the village as 658 people in 211 households.

In 2021, the rural district was separated from the district in the formation of Taher Gurab District.
