= Kowdeh =

Kowdeh or Kudeh (Persian: كوده) may refer to:

- Kudeh, Gilan
- Kowdeh, Razavi Khorasan
