= Visheh Sara, Sowme'eh Sara =

Village in Gilan province, Iran

Visheh Sara Persian: ويشه سرا
- Village
- Location within Iran
- Coordinates: 37°21′59″N 49°12′02″E
- Country: Iran
- Province: Gilan
- County: Sowme'eh Sara
- District: Taher Gurab
- Rural District: Taher Gurab

Population (2016)
  - Total: 49
- Time zone: UTC+3:30 (IRST)

Visheh Sara (Persian: ويشه سرا) (Note: Also romanized as Vīsheh Sarā) is a village in Taher Gurab Rural District of Taher Gurab District in Sowme'eh Sara County, Gilan province, Iran.

== Demographics ==
=== Population ===
At the time of the 2006 National Census, the village's population was 120 in 35 households, when it was in the Central District. The following census in 2011 counted 72 people in 23 households. The 2016 census measured the population of the village as 49 people in 18 households.

In 2021, the rural district was separated from the district in the formation of Taher Gurab District.
