= Kord Mahalleh, Sowme'eh Sara =

Village in Gilan province, Iran

Kord Mahalleh Persian: كردمحله
- Village
- Location within Iran
- Country: Iran
- Province: Gilan
- County: Sowme'eh Sara
- District: Taher Gurab
- Rural District: Taher Gurab

Population (2016)
  - Total: 274
- Time zone: UTC+3:30 (IRST)

Kord Mahalleh (Persian: كردمحله) (Note: Also romanized as Kord Maḩalleh; also known as Maḩmūd Kīā) is a village in Taher Gurab Rural District of Taher Gurab District in Sowme'eh Sara County, Gilan province, Iran.

== Demographics ==
=== Population ===
At the time of the 2006 National Census, the village's population was 351 in 102 households, when it was in the Central District. The following census in 2011 counted 307 people in 95 households. The 2016 census measured the population of the village as 274 people in 92 households.

In 2021, the rural district was separated from the district in the formation of Taher Gurab District.
