= Kelidbar =

Kelidbar or Kelid Bar or Kelid Bor (Persian: كليدبر) may refer to:

- Kelidbar, Langarud
- Kelid Bar, Sowme'eh Sara
