= Owmandan =

Village in Gilan province, Iran

Owmandan Persian: اومندان
- Village
- Location within Iran
- Coordinates: 37°23′44″N 49°14′45″E
- Country: Iran
- Province: Gilan
- County: Sowme'eh Sara
- District: Taher Gurab
- Rural District: Taher Gurab

Population (2016)
  - Total: 255
- Time zone: UTC+3:30 (IRST)

Owmandan (Persian: اومندان) (Note: Also romanized as Owmandān, Umandan, and Ūmandān; also known as Ma‘āf-e Omandān and Omandān) is a village in Taher Gurab Rural District of Taher Gurab District in Sowme'eh Sara County, Gilan province, Iran.

== Demographics ==
=== Population ===
At the time of the 2006 National Census, the village's population was 345 in 113 households, when it was in the Central District. The following census in 2011 counted 295 people in 111 households. The 2016 census measured the population of the village as 255 people in 110 households.

In 2021, the rural district was separated from the district in the formation of Taher Gurab District.
