= Avatara Purusha =

Avatara Purusha may refer to:

- Avatara Purusha (1989 film), an Indian Kannada-language action thriller film
- Avatara Purusha (2022 film), an Indian Kannada-language supernatural comedy thriller film
  - Avatara Purusha 2, its 2024 sequel

== See also ==
- Avathara Purushan, a 1996 Indian film
- Avatar (disambiguation)
- Puruṣārtha (disambiguation)
