= Avatar: The Last Airbender (disambiguation) =

Avatar: The Last Airbender is an American animated television series that aired on Nickelodeon.

Avatar: The Last Airbender or The Last Airbender may also refer to:

- Avatar: The Last Airbender (franchise), a media franchise that began with the 2005 animated series of the same name
  - Avatar: The Last Airbender (video game), 2006
  - Avatar: The Last Airbender (comics), a comic book series continuation of the animated series
- The Last Airbender (film), a 2010 live-action film based on the animated series
  - The Last Airbender (video game), 2010
  - The Last Airbender (soundtrack), the soundtrack to the 2010 film
- Avatar: The Last Airbender (2024 TV series), a live-action series based on the animated series
- Avatar Aang: The Last Airbender, an animated film, set after the animated series

== See also ==
- Avatar (disambiguation)
- The Legend of Aang (disambiguation)
