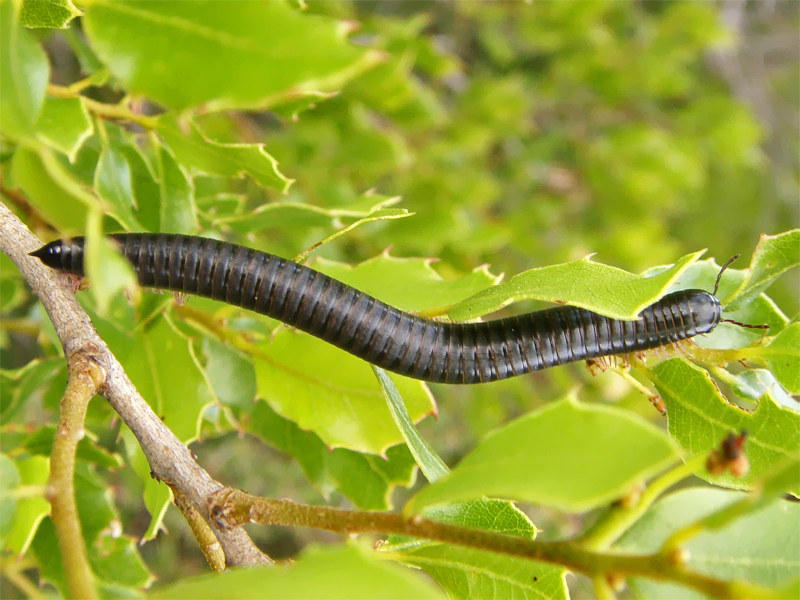

Scientific classification
- Kingdom: Animalia
- Phylum: Arthropoda
- Subphylum: Myriapoda
- Class: Diplopoda
- Order: Julida
- Family: Julidae
- Genus: Ommatoiulus
- Species: O. moreletii

Binomial name
- Ommatoiulus moreletii (Lucas, 1860)

= Ommatoiulus moreleti =

Species of millipede

Ommatoiulus moreletii (spelt moreleti in older publications), commonly known as the Portuguese millipede, is a herbivorous millipede native to the western Iberian Peninsula where it shares its range with other Ommatoiulus species. From here, it has spread by international commerce to a number of new localities. This species was accidentally introduced into Australia without its natural enemies and has since become an invasive pest. This species has also been introduced into New Zealand. A number of methods have been developed to manage this millipede.

== Distribution ==
O. moreleti is indigenous to the western Iberian Peninsula. It has spread to a number of Atlantic islands (Macaronesia and Bermuda), South Africa, Australia and New Zealand. This distribution appears to be related to 20th century shipping routes. Spread of O. moreleti by international trade may be facilitated by its ability to survive long sea voyages in a quiescent state. This species survives long, dry summers in a quiescent state in its natural habitat.

After its initial introduction to South Australia in about 1953, perhaps originating from ships’ ballast, the species is continuing to spread through southern Australia. It is possible that there has been more than one introduction to Australia. Since being introduced to Port Lincoln, South Australia in 1953, the millipede has spread to other parts of South Australia, Victoria, Tasmania, Australian Capital Territory, southern New South Wales and Western Australia around Perth. This species became established in New Zealand in the early 2000s.

== Life cycle ==
O. moreleti (male)

Reproductive females mature their eggs during late summer-early autumn, and may be seen mating in the autumnal activity period. The female lays 60–80 eggs in a chamber 1–2 cm deep in the soil. The egg hatches to a pupoid stage, then develops by a series of moults up to 16 stages over 3 years. Males can be differentiated by the 8th and 12th stages but most are mature by the 10th or 11th stages. Females probably mature at similar stages. One-year-old immatures (stages 7–9) are light brown with a darker medial stripe.

After 2 years the 10–11 stage millipedes turn black. Adult Portuguese millipedes are smooth, 20–45 millimetres (0.8–1.8 in) long and coloured from grey to black. Millipedes older than 1 year moult only in spring and summer. Adult males are periodomorphic, alternating between a sexual and a non-sexual form. In their sexual form, they have gonopods (mating legs) in the seventh body segment, which they lose when they moult in spring. They remain in the non-sexual "eunuch" form until their late summer moult.

== Activity ==
The main period of O. moreleti activity follows the breaking of summer drought by autumnal rains and cooling temperatures. In autumn and early winter, millipedes are active on the surface and may be observed mating. A temperature range 17–21 °C and humidity of around 95% favour activity. These conditions characteristically occur at night. Under similar conditions, individual females on laboratory treadmills move up to 50 metres per day.

In winter, there is little surface activity but during spring there is an increase in surface activity. With increasing summer temperatures, O. moreleti aggregates in humid habitats. At temperatures around 27 °C, millipedes become quiescent.

== Habitat ==
In the southern Iberian Peninsula, a number of species of the genus Ommatoiulus share a similar range but divide their habitat by type of ground litter. This close species packing suggests habitat partitioning may operate to limit numbers of O. moreleti in relation to other Ommatoiulus species. O. moreleti prefers tree litter, particularly Quercus spp. (densities stage 7 or older O. moreleti of about 5 per m^{2}) and Pinus spp. O. moreleti is replaced by other species in shrub litter or grasslands. In southern Australia, grassland densities (stage 7 or older) of O. moreleti are over 40 per m.^{2}.

As an invading species in the southern Australian detritivore community, O. moreleti does not appear to have negatively affected native millipedes sharing a similar range, and seems to have occupied vacant niches.

== Food ==
Gut contents of mature O. moreleti collected in Portugal were predominantly fragments of Quercus and Pinus litter. The guts also contained significant amounts of fresh mosses and liverworts. O. moreleti can be raised in culture from egg to reproductive stage by feeding solely on fresh mosses.

== Natural enemies ==
Natural enemies in Portugal include the European hedgehog (Erinaceus europaeus) and the beetle Ocypus olens, both of which are generalist predators. A number of parasites have also been identified. None of the natural enemies found in Portugal occur in Australia.

In many parts of South Australia, densities of O. moreleti have declined markedly from a peak period in the 1970s, to relatively low densities from the mid 1980s to the present. This decline has been associated with parasitism by the nematode Rhabditis necromena that appears to have spread from native millipede populations. This nematode has been actively spread throughout O. moreleti populations in South Australia by government and private operators. Infection can be detected by crushing a millipede in saline in a petri dish and examining under a X20 dissecting microscope.

In New Zealand it has been suggested the nematode Steinernema feltiae could be an effective biocontrol agent used to control O. moreleti. Laboratory trials in New Zealand showed that the millipede is unaffected by Steinernema feltiae.

== Human interactions ==
In urban areas of southern Australia, O. moreleti enter dwellings during their autumn and spring activity periods. This species is also known to enter dwellings in Wellington, New Zealand. As a result of infestations of this invasive to New Zealand species in Wellington in 2025 an ecological study has been commenced.

As a defense mechanism, the millipede secretes a pungent yellowish fluid containing quinones. This stains clothes permanently and irritates eyes. Due to this defence it is best for people to sweep them up rather than crushing them.

In South Australia in the 1970s when O. moreleti were dense in the immediate house surrounds, householders were sweeping volumes of up to several litres from their houses each morning. O. moreleti, alone of the millipede species in this environment, is attracted to low intensity light, of the type emitted from houses at night. Householders in South Australia have used chemical or physical barriers to prevent millipedes from entering houses. Recently, population suppression by spreading the nematode Rhabditis necromena appears to have effectively reduced millipede populations below worry thresholds over large areas of urban and semi-rural South Australia.

In southern Australia O. moreleti is reported as damaging seedlings of brassica and cereal crops and soft, ripe fruits such as strawberries. Millipedes sheltering in bunches of wine grapes at harvest (autumn) may taint wine.

Masses of O. moreleti on railway lines during their activity periods are reported as causing slippage of locomotives in South Australia, Victoria and Western Australia, and train cancellations due to the disturbance of signalling equipment. Crushed millipedes may have caused a 2013 minor train crash in Clarkson, Western Australia. Millipedes on the tracks appear to have affected the train's deceleration. In Adelaide, suburban trains are fitted with brushes before the front wheels to clear the line of millipedes.
