= Taher Gurab =

City in Gilan province, Iran

Taher Gurab Persian: طاهرگوراب
- City
- Location within Iran
- Coordinates: 37°22′59″N 49°13′34″E
- Country: Iran
- Province: Gilan
- County: Sowme'eh Sara
- District: Taher Gurab
- Established as a city: 2023

Population (2016)
  - Total: 1,168
- Time zone: UTC+3:30 (IRST)

Taher Gurab (Persian: طاهرگوراب) (Note: Also romanized as Ţāher Gūrāb; also known as Tāhir Gurāb and Takhergurab) is a city in, and the capital of, Taher Gurab District in Sowme'eh Sara County, Gilan province, Iran. As a village, it was the capital of Taher Gurab Rural District until its capital was transferred to the village of Now Kasht.

== Demographics ==
=== Population ===
At the time of the 2006 National Census, Taher Gurab's population was 1,311 in 367 households, when it was a village in Taher Gurab Rural District of the Central District. The following census in 2011 counted 1,331 people in 423 households. The 2016 census measured the population of the village as 1,168 people in 396 households.

In 2021, the rural district was separated from the district in the formation of Taher Gurab District. The village of Taher Gurab was converted to a city in 2023.
