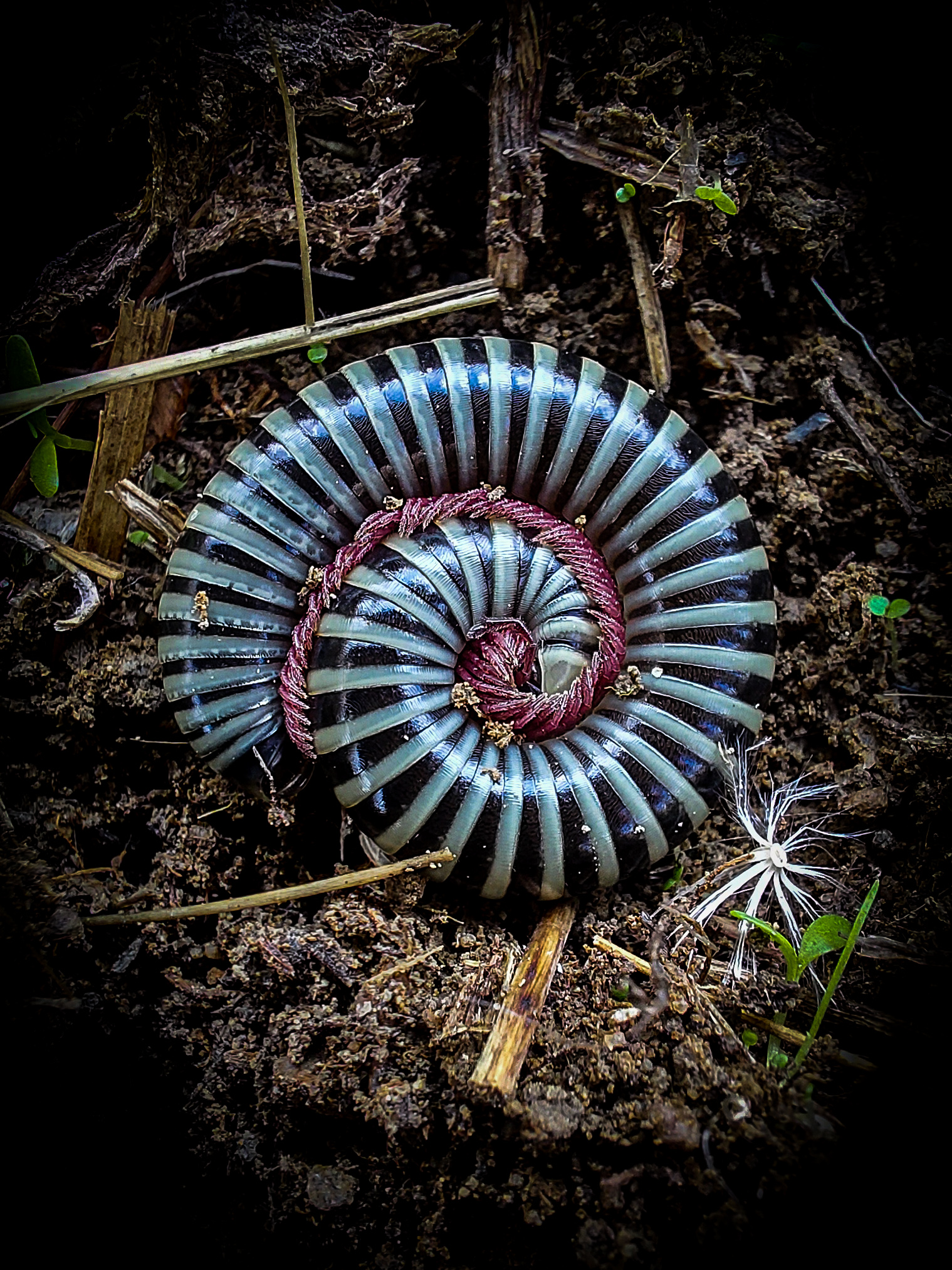

Scientific classification
- Kingdom: Animalia
- Phylum: Arthropoda
- Subphylum: Myriapoda
- Class: Diplopoda
- Order: Julida
- Family: Julidae
- Genus: Ommatoiulus
- Species: O. lusitanus

Binomial name
- Ommatoiulus lusitanus (Verhoeff, 1895)

Synonyms
- Archiulus cingulatus Attems, 1927; Schistocoxitus cingulatus (Attems, 1927); Ommatoiulus cingulatus (Attems, 1927); Schizophyllum lusitanum Verhoeff, 1895

= Ommatoiulus lusitanus =

Species of millipede

Ommatoiulus lusitanus is a species of millipede endemic to Portugal. It predominantly inhabits grassland but also occurs in Cistus litter.
