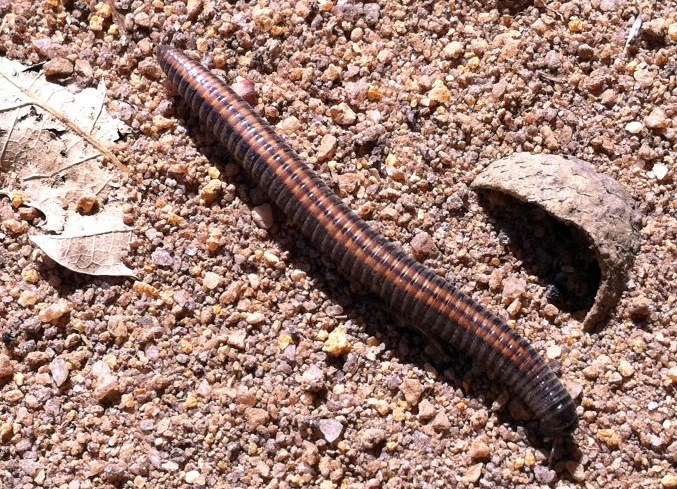

Scientific classification
- Kingdom: Animalia
- Phylum: Arthropoda
- Subphylum: Myriapoda
- Class: Diplopoda
- Order: Julida
- Family: Julidae
- Genus: Ommatoiulus
- Species: O. sabulosus

Binomial name
- Ommatoiulus sabulosus (Linnaeus, 1758)

Synonyms
- Julus sabulosus Linnaeus, 1758; Archiulus sabulosus Berlese, 1886; Schizophyllum sabulosum Verhoeff, 1895

= Ommatoiulus sabulosus =

Striped millipede

Species of millipede

Ommatoiulus sabulosus, also known as the striped millipede, is a European millipede of the family Julidae. Its common name comes from its two striking bright longitudinal bands on the dorsal surface.

O. sabulosus is widespread and common in Central Europe and on the British Isles. It has a broad habitat range, including open areas such as meadows, fields, and roadside edges as well as sandy soils and the leaf-litter of forests of pine, oak, and beech trees. O. sabulosus occurs at elevations ranging from sea level up to 2800 metres.

O. sabulosus occasionally occurs in large numbers and mass migrations. They are excellent scavengers, eating foliage, rotten wood and other dead plant material, and produce humus that is exploited by plants for growth. Geographic subspecies or 'forms' include Ommatoiulus sabulosus aimatopodus.
