= Abatar =

Village in Gilan province, Iran

Abatar Persian: اباتر
- Village
- Location within Iran
- Coordinates: 37°22′11″N 49°15′54″E
- Country: Iran
- Province: Gilan
- County: Sowme'eh Sara
- District: Taher Gurab
- Rural District: Abatar

Population (2016)
  - Total: 1,538
- Time zone: UTC+3:30 (IRST)

Abatar (Persian: اباتر) (Note: Also romanized as Abātar and Abāter) is a village in, and the capital of, Abatar Rural District in Taher Gurab District of Sowme'eh Sara County, Gilan province, Iran.

== Demographics ==
=== Population ===
At the time of the 2006 National Census, the village's population was 1,822 in 528 households, when it was in Taher Gurab Rural District of the Central District. The following census in 2011 counted 1,775 people in 592 households. The 2016 census measured the population of the village as 1,538 people in 552 households. It was the most populous village in its rural district.

In 2021, the rural district was separated from the district in the formation of Taher Gurab District. Abatar was transferred to Abatar Rural District created in the new district.
