= Sharam, Iran =

Village in Gilan province, Iran

Sharam Persian: شارم
- Village
- Location within Iran
- Coordinates: 37°20′53″N 49°15′46″E
- Country: Iran
- Province: Gilan
- County: Sowme'eh Sara
- District: Taher Gurab
- Rural District: Abatar

Population (2016)
  - Total: 311
- Time zone: UTC+3:30 (IRST)

Sharam (Persian: شارم) (Note: Also romanized as Shāram) is a village in Abatar Rural District of Taher Gurab District in Sowme'eh Sara County, Gilan province, Iran.

== Demographics ==
=== Population ===
At the time of the 2006 National Census, the village's population was 392 in 114 households, when it was in Kasma Rural District of the Central District. The following census in 2011 counted 356 people in 112 households. The 2016 census measured the population of the village as 311 people in 101 households.

In 2021, the rural district was separated from the district in the formation of Taher Gurab District. Sharam was transferred to Abatar Rural District created in the new district.
