= AVATAR MUD =

A.V.A.T.A.R. MUD
- One of AVATAR's login screens
- Developers: Volunteer staff and community
- Engine: Heavily modified Merc 2.2
- Platform: Platform independent
- Release: WW: 1991
- Genres: hack and slash, role-playing, interactive fiction, social gaming
- Mode: single-player/multiplayer

A.V.A.T.A.R. MUD is a free, online, massively multiplayer, fantasy, text-based role-playing game (or MUD), set in a real-time virtual environment. It combines elements of role-playing games, hack and slash style computer games, adventure games and social gaming.

It began as an LPMUD called Farside MUD at Newcastle University, in the summer of 1991, before ultimately relocating to the United States. It suffered catastrophic loss of data in August 1994, which led to a switch to the Merc code base. On 8 August 1995, its name was changed to A.V.A.T.A.R. MUD.

Over three decades, the game's environment has grown into a fictional world spanning 387 areas across 20 planes, comprising 20,000 unique rooms with gameplay and features that significantly deviate from the original Merc codebase.

== History ==
=== Early days ===
The MUD was started in the summer of 1991 as an LPMUD called Farside MUD. It was initially hosted on the servers of Newcastle University by three PhD computer science candidates. It later moved to Swansea University until they announced a ban on mudding, before crossing the Atlantic to take up residence on a couple of machines in the United States of America.

=== The switch from LPMUD to Merc 2.2 ===
Catastrophic loss of data in August 1994, presented the implementors with an opportunity to switch to the Merc code base.

Farside MUD was created during the summer of 1991 with the established LPMUD codebase, released two years prior. The original DikuMUD code base was released just a few months before Farside's creation on 1 March 1991, and had yet to become popular at that time.

DikuMUD was quickly followed by the creation of CopperMUD in June 1991. In December 1991, CopperMUD released its source code, leading to the creation of MercMUD on 18 December 1992. The final Merc codebase (version 2.2) was released on 24 November 1993, and this newer codebase was chosen by Farside MUD the following year due to the gameplay similarities with LPMUD.

==== Avatar's position within the MUD trees ====
The MUD trees below depict the hierarchy of derivation of the A.V.A.T.A.R. MUD codebase. Solid lines between boxes indicate code relationships, while dotted lines indicate conceptual relationships. Dotted boxes indicate that the codebase is outside the family depicted. To see the full trees, please visit the main article.

1992 ~ 1994

TinyMUD	AberMUD
LPMud
Farside

1994 ~ Present

AberMUD
Diku
Diku II	Sequent
Copper1
Copper2	Merc1
Copper2	Merc2
Farside/ AVATAR

=== Change of name ===
On 8 August 1995, after disagreements between the implementors, Farside MUD became A.V.A.T.A.R. MUD. The MUD administrator, code named Snikt, changed all of the admin passwords and locked out the MUD's owner, code named Rox. Rox would later start a new MUD, Barren Realms, using a heavily modified merc2.2 code base. The MUD's newsletter, published two days later, states:

All of the players pfiles have remained intact, as have all of the areas.
All of your favorite Immortals and Heroes are still there.
Only the Implementor has changed, and the name.

Although the implementors of A.V.A.T.A.R. MUD retained the right to use the "Farside MUD" name, the new name reflected the change in leadership and avoided the possibility of being sued by The Far Side comic strip's creator. The new name is an acronym which stands for "Advanced Virtual Adventures Through Artificial Realities" and was inspired by the computing term "avatar".

== Development ==
Over the 35 years (as of 2026) that the MUD has been running, the Merc 2.2 code base has been extensively updated and modified.

=== Game tiers ===
A.V.A.T.A.R.'s tiered level system is an original design feature. The original 35 game levels of the Merc codebase, extended to 50 levels, now form the lowest playable tier of the game, referred to as "Mortal." A hero tier was added in 1994, followed by two other higher tiers; Lord and Legend (team-based player-versus-player) in June 1996. Prior to the tier system, the MUD had a simple level progression from 1–1000.

=== Classes and races ===
Characters possess gender, race, and class. The mud has 28 creatable races (of which two are 'evolutionary' – containing 14 sub-races), nine quest races (elemental giants and chromatic dragons, added mid-2013), sixteen 'remort' (second playthrough) races, and two 'ascension' (pvp legend tier specific) races. All together, players currently have access to 67 races, not counting grandfathered races or races only available to non-player characters and staff members.

The game has seven creatable classes, fourteen 'prestige' (quest accessible) classes, and six powerful 'remort' classes, for a total of twenty-seven classes, not counting grandfathered classes or classes only available to NPCs and staff members.

=== Area building ===
Though the Merc MUD codebases usually come with a set of 52 stock areas, all of A.V.A.T.A.R.'s areas are non-stock. Some areas retain the theme of the stock areas they replaced. The MUD continues to grow, with 387 areas online as of January 2014. In addition to these permanent additions, temporary areas and quests are regularly added to the MUD, and older, less-visited areas are either revamped or removed.

=== Development staff ===
The coders of the MUD are members of its Immortal staff, formed from dedicated volunteers who largely forego playing the game in order to devote their time to its maintenance and development. "Trackies" form a second tier of staff which is split into seven tracks (Builder, Design, Publicity, Quest, Retro, Tester, Web).

=== Influence on other MUDs ===
As Farside MUD, it donated FTP space to a 1993 inter-MUD project to produce an area editor called "Make.Zones.Fast". Design features and code from A.V.A.T.A.R. has been borrowed by other MUDs. Examples of code featuring copied or imitative code which credit A.V.A.T.A.R. can be found on repositories like MUDBytes.net.

== Features ==
=== Free to play ===
A.V.A.T.A.R. is a 100% free-to-play game. Unlike freemium games, there is no system to pay for additional benefits.

The license for Diku codebase states:

You may under no circumstances make profit on *ANY* part of DikuMud in any possible way. You may under no circumstances charge money for distributing any part of dikumud – this includes the usual $5 charge for "sending the disk" or "just for the disk" etc.

Thus the game is developed and run entirely by a large staff of volunteers.

=== Multi-platform ===
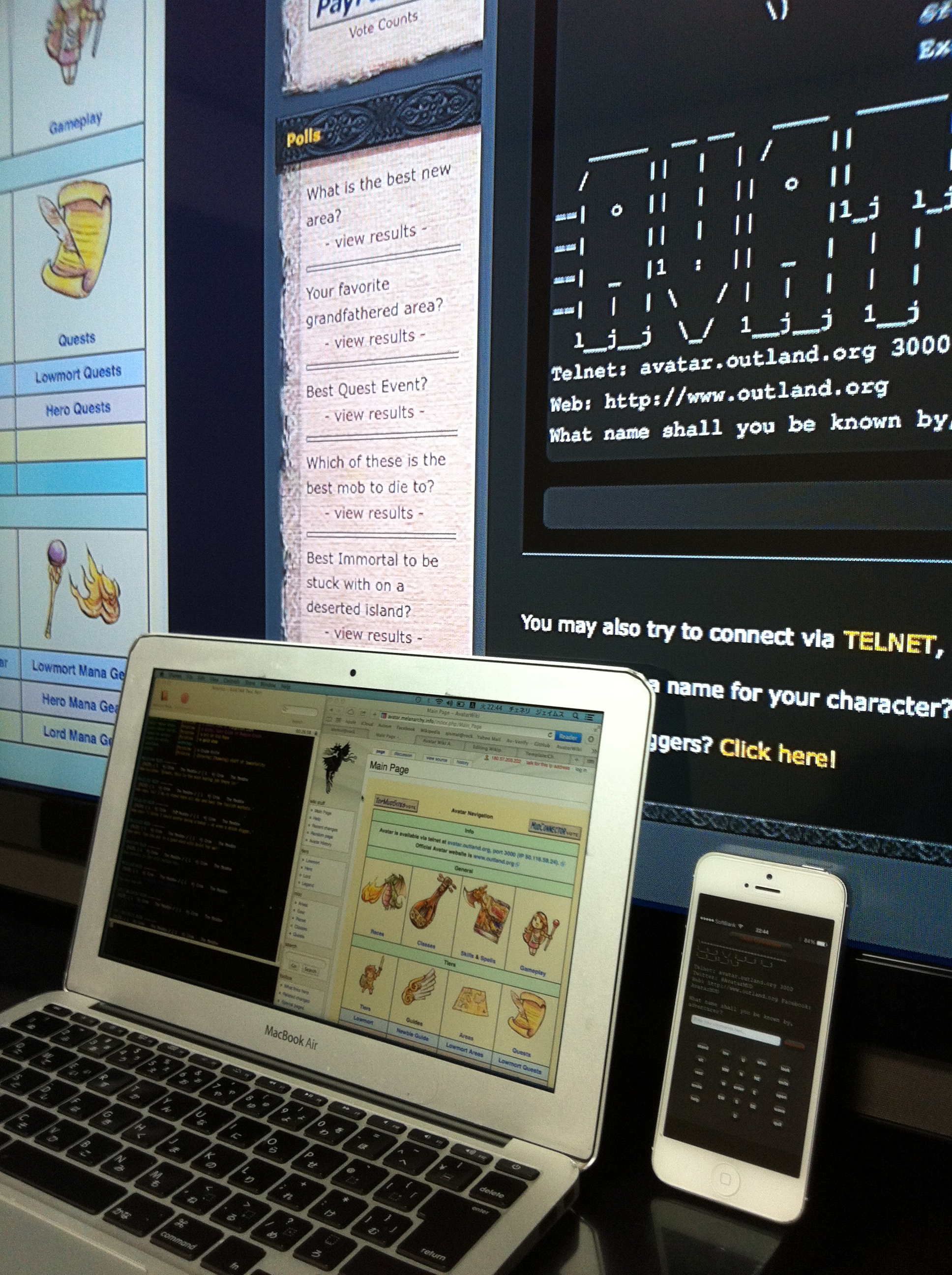
A smartphone, laptop and desktop system connected to AVATAR MUD using different clients. A player-created wiki can also be seen on two of the screens.

The game can be played on various devices (such as smart phones and tablets) and operating systems. A connection to the game server can be established by:

- Opening a web browser window on any internet-connected computer and using the built-in client application on the official website or Facebook.
- Using a web browser or telnet at the command prompt to open a port in Windows, OSX, Linux, etc.
- Downloading a MUD client or TELNET client software for a computer, or an Android or iOS MUD client mobile app for a smartphone or tablet computer

As all game data is stored on the server, players can switch devices.

=== Fantasy setting ===
A.V.A.T.A.R. is set in a fantasy world, which occasionally incorporates elements from other fictional genres, such as steampunk. Combat is primarily conducted through melee, martial arts, and spells, alongside thrown weapons and archery. Most transportation is achieved by "walking" (following directions to an adjacent room), though there are other options including foot ferries, guides, transportation spells, planar travel. and permanent portals. The theme is further reinforced through the use of ASCII art.

=== Parental controls ===
Due to the presence of younger players, the MUD has a strict language policy which is enforced through automatic logging of bad language and monitoring by staff members. In addition to this, players may select the option to censor common vulgar words appearing in communications from other players.

=== Accessibility ===
As a text-based game, it is used by the blind and visually impaired with the assistance of screen reading software, and also the hearing impaired who are not disadvantaged due to the absence of auditory cues.

Playing with a screen reader can also help those with low literacy or learning disabilities to enjoy the game whilst helping them improve their language skills, computer literacy and social skills.

Some MUD clients include customisable user interfaces, such as definable buttons or rollers, which can largely remove the need to manually type commands, which is very helpful for those whose ability to operate a keyboard is impaired. Computer accessibility issues can then be overcome with assistive technologies, such as a footmouse.

=== Education ===
AVATAR has had a connection with education since 1994, when a large group of students from a US school began to play, followed by some staff members, and ultimately resulting in the principal joining the MUD as a staff member. Since then, those chosen to be immortals have often held careers in education, alongside more traditional fields like programming.

Staff noted that their students' literacy skills improved, with academic literature suggesting it is because they found the creative writing and interactive content of the mud compelling to read, and because they needed a certain level of communicative competence to be able to interact with both the computer server running the game and their fellow players to achieve their goals. Through their participation, they were also encouraged to develop collaborative teamwork and social skills in order to overcome the challenges presented to them.

The students, though playing as part of a player community of various ages and nationalities, were impressed that they were taken seriously and treated as competent peers by older members, and thus had the opportunity to create new content or influence the policies and game mechanics of the MUD. Many of these students went on to become staff members themselves, and apply their experiences in the real world.

Having educators involved in the design and development of the game resulted in new features such as the creation of a "Mud School" to train new players in how to interact and play the game, and a new tier of volunteer staff (angels) to care for and assist new and younger players. This is complemented by the MUD's family-friendly policy.

== Gameplay ==
The game is open to anyone and permits multiple connections from the same IP address (as long as each active character is controlled by a separate player).

New characters begin in the "Mudschool" area, which teaches the basic commands, game mechanics and rules of the game. Roleplay on A.V.A.T.A.R. is encouraged but not enforced, so much of a player's activity involves finding mobs (non-player characters) to perform quests for, slay for experience points, or somehow acquire desirable items from, and exploration in order to enjoy the writing and story of an area or discover easter eggs and other secrets. As a social space, the game comprises only half of the attraction of the MUD, with players using various tools such as public and private chat channels, an in-game messaging system and forums to engage one another. Players can buy, sell, and trade gear.

As player characters gain experience points, they will increase in level, slowly rising through the four tiers of the game: Mortal ( 1–50 ), Hero ( 51[1]-51[999] ), Lord ( 125[1]-125[999] ), and Legend ( 250[1]-250[999] ). At each tier, the style of gameplay changes. Players can explore the world solo or in groups.

== In other media ==
The MUD has been examined in the papers and presentations of anthropologist Dr. Mizuko Ito, a thesis by tech entrepreneur Kraettli Epperson, and other papers. It has featured in MUD history articles, Orlando Sentinel's article on TELNET and in a video tutorial and tutorial article about CMD.

An introductory article to A.V.A.T.A.R. was printed in Mensa's RPSIG publication 'Re:Quests!' and also in the 1 October 1994 edition of the "Sunlight Through The Shadows" BBS's electronic magazine, and other publications. After running for a couple of years, Immortal "Asamaro" created the publication "the Farside Gazette" on 15 December 1994, which continued to be regularly published, latterly as "the AVATAR Gazette", until May 2009.
