= The Legend of Aang =

The Legend of Aang may refer to:

- Avatar: The Last Airbender, a 2005 animated television series, known as "Avatar: The Legend of Aang" in some regions
- The Legend of Aang: The Last Airbender, a 2026 animated film, set after the 2005 series

== See also ==
- The Last Airbender (disambiguation)
