= Avatharam =

Avatharam (lit. 'avatar') may refer to:

- Avatharam (1995 film), an Indian Tamil-language film
- Avatharam (2014 Malayalam film), an Indian Malayalam-language film
- Avatharam (2014 Telugu film), an Indian Telugu-language film

== See also ==
- Avatar (disambiguation)
