= Besharam =

Besharam (lit. 'shameless') may refer to:

- Besharam (1978 film), an Indian Hindi-language drama-thriller film by Deven Verma, starring Verma, Amitabh Bachchan, Sharmila Tagore and Amjad Khan
- Besharam (2013 film), an Indian action comedy film by Abhinav Kashyap, starring Ranbir Kapoor and Pallavi Sharda
- Besharam (TV series), a 2016 Pakistani drama serial

== See also ==
- Sharam (disambiguation), shame in Persian
- Besharmi Morcha, an Indian transnational movement
- "Besharmi Ki Height", a song by Benny Dayal and Shalmali Kholgade from the 2014 Indian film Main Tera Hero
