= De Saram =

De Saram is a surname. Notable people with the surname include:

- Carole De Saram, American feminist and women's rights activist
- Fredrick de Saram, Sri Lankan lawyer, cricket captain, and military officer
- Indika de Saram, Sri Lankan cricketer
- John De Saram, Sri Lankan lawyer and diplomat
- Lakshman Joseph de Saram, Sri Lankan composer and musician
- Rohan de Saram, British and Sri Lankan cellist
- Rohan Joseph de Saram, Sri Lankan pianist and conductor
- R. S. de Saram, Sri Lankan educationist and clergyman
