= Carole De Saram =

American feminist and women's rights activist

- Born: February 27, 1939 (age 87); New York City, US
- Known for: women's rights advocate National Organization for Women (NOW)

Carole De Saram (born February 27, 1939) is an American feminist and women's rights activist. She is the former president of the New York chapter of the National Organization for Women (NOW). She was an advocate for women's equality through intersectionality with economics.

== Early life and education ==
De Saram was born on February 27, 1939, in Queens, New York. She attended Grover Cleveland High School in Queens. In a high school music class, De Saram was given a French horn, despite no former formal music training; after intensive training, she auditioned for the All City Orchestra and made second horn, playing a French horn solo at Carnegie Hall.

She earned a Bachelor of Arts in Political Science and Economics from Columbia University.

== Career ==
=== Wall Street ===
After earning her bachelor's degree, De Saram moved to Tribeca to work as a computer analyst at Chemical Bank, and was later appointed as the bank's Assistant Vice President

=== Women's movement ===
De Saram's first protest occurred in 1964, when she sent a full-page letter to Procter & Gamble stating disapproval of an advertisement for Tide and that she would try another brand. In response, she received a full-page letter reply and the company pulled the ad.

While working on Wall Street, a coworker informed De Saram of a National Organization for Women (NOW) meeting in New York. The meeting, De Saram's first, took place in 1970 in the basement of a church as no other place would rent to the women. As a result, she participated in a march down Fifth Avenue in 1970 for women's rights. As she got more involved, De Saram focused on ending credit discrimination against women on the basis of their marital status.

In 1971, De Saram and other members of NOW New York engaged in a zap action when they snuck into the American Stock Exchange, under the guise of a garden club. Once admitted, she and her protest partners held up a banner reading "Woman Power," where each letter matched the size of the balcony windows. They yelled "We can't bear any more bull!" The Stock Exchange essentially shut down, as the brokers stopped their work to boo the protestors. De Saram and her protest partners had previously arranged for a van to drive around Wall Street calling out "Women have taken over Wall Street!" As the protesters left the Stock Exchanged, they marched to the Treasury steps. As a result, many gathered to see the protestors.

She also caused the closure of a Citibank branch by encouraging women to close accounts with them. Upon seeing this, the bank president shut the doors and made all women line up in order to close accounts. De Saram and female protestors held banners outside the bank which was caught on film and used in a movie. As a result of NOW's pressure, Citibank changed their terminology around women and actively campaigned directly to women.

In 1974, De Saram was elected president of the New York chapter of NOW and called a hearing for the New York State Human Rights Commission regarding the practice of firing pregnant women and denying them benefits. De Saram served two terms as president of the New York NOW chapter.

Also in 1974, De Saram testified before the Congressional Banking Commission about discrimination in credit against women. At that time, the US Department of Housing and Urban Development (HUD) required couples with two incomes to prove that the woman had been sterilized. One year later, in 1975, this requirement was banned by federal legislation.

De Saram took on the State Human Rights Commission in 1974 over providing unemployment benefits to pregnant women; her activism ended the practice. She later served on the New York State Human Rights Commission Advisory Council. In that same year she participated with the National Council of Churches on stockholder actions against unfair hiring practices at corporations.

In 1975, De Saram came up with the idea for a Women's Bank and was also a member of the Advisory Board of Directors and worked with a group of women to form a Feminist Credit Union.

De Saram eventually left the bank in 1981 to serve in Mayor Ed Koch's administration as New York City's Commissioner of the Treasury.

In 2009, De Saram resigned as chairperson of Community Board 1's Tribeca Committee but remained on the board. De Saram helped form the Tribeca Community Association (for which she also served as vice president) as well as the Committee for the Washington Market Historic District.

== Personal life ==
De Saram is married to Raymond Erickson, a musician and scholar. She has two children, Lisa and Douglas.
