= Sarum =

Sarum may refer to:

== Places ==
- either of two cities in Wiltshire, England:
  - Salisbury, also known as New Sarum
  - Old Sarum, the ruins of old Salisbury
- Sarum (Newport, Maryland), a historic house in Newport, Maryland, United States
- Sarum Chase, a historic house in London, England
- Sirmaniyah or Sarmin, two villages in Syria identified as the possible birthplace of the Catholic saint John Maron

== Religion ==
- Sarum, an archaic name for the English diocese of Salisbury, still used in some contexts including Archdeacon of Sarum
- Sarum Rite, the major liturgical rite in England prior to the English Reformation

== Other uses ==
- Sarum, The Spirit of Salisbury School
- Sarum (beetle), a genus of beetles in the family Chrysomelidae
- Sarum lectures, at the University of Oxford
- Sarum (novel), a 1987 work of historical fiction
- Sarum, a style of cassock that is double-breasted with three buttons
