= Zone (video games) =

Distinct area of the environment in an online video game

In a MUD or MMO, zone and area are terms used to refer to one of the parts of the shared virtual environment.

They should not be confused with levels (where a player proceeds through a series of stages in a linear or semi-linear manner). Areas may vary in the challenge they present to visiting players, but are typically accessible by characters irrespective of the character's advancement within the game. Where 'levels' are sections of a game, 'areas' are special sections of a virtual environment in which there may or may not be a game at all.

The environments of MUDs and MMOs may be seamlessly sewn together, in which case it may be difficult or impossible for the player to know the precise boundaries of a particular area, or they may be connected by connector zones (such as the classic sight-line blocking z-shaped corridor) or portals. In some games it is possible to note changes in area through different flora and fauna, altered livery of guards, or special skills.

Many MUDs are hybrids, containing sections which are seamlessly stitched together alongside other areas which are only accessible via portals, etc. In MUDs, and other games where characters transiting zones is a trivial server task, connector zones frequently areas in their own right.

Zones are useful for game developers, because they enable the developer to create and modify the game in parts, and online games, such as MUDs can focus their server resources on areas which are populated.

== Communication ==
Methods of communication may be restricted to a zone, part of a zone, a group of zones, or the entire environment. Some parts (rooms/areas/groups of areas) of a MUD's environment may even block some or all types of communications (including non-message communication, such as coded social gestures) from entering, leaving or being performed or perceived).

Illumination (due to day/night cycles, magical/environmental darkness or the presence/possession/use of a light source) can affect whether the identity of the originator of a message can be perceived, in addition to non-area factors like blindness/deafness (due to spell effects, items (e.g. a blindfold), etc.), and invisibility (from spells and affects).

=== An example set ===
The following table is an example set of communication commands for a MUD demonstrating the area-based restrictions. In addition to environmental restrictions, channels of communication can also be socially restricted (e.g. to friend lists, guilds, etc.), position specific (newbie-helper, coder, quest staff, etc.) or advancement restricted (for players of a certain level or higher).

Command	Characters affected
SAY	Visible to players in the same room
YELL	Visible to players in the same area
SHOUT	Visible to all players in the environment
TELL	Visible to a specific player in the environment
{social action}	Visible to a player in the same room
{social action}	Visible to a player in the same area with "From afar, " prefix

== Area design ==
Areas must be considered as part of the greater whole. An area whose rewards are too generous will draw traffic away from other areas.

The creation of areas is referred to as "writing an area" or "building," sometimes earning players or staff who write areas the epithet of "builder."
