= Abatar Rural District =

Rural district in Gilan province, Iran

Abatar Rural District Persian: دهستان اباتر
- Rural District
- Location within Iran
- Coordinates: 37°22′N 49°17′E
- Country: Iran
- Province: Gilan
- County: Sowme'eh Sara
- District: Taher Gurab
- Established: 2021
- Capital: Abatar
- Time zone: UTC+3:30 (IRST)

Abatar Rural District (Persian: دهستان اباتر) is in Taher Gurab District of Sowme'eh Sara County, Gilan province, Iran. Its capital is the village of Abatar, whose population at the time of the 2016 National Census was 1,538 in 552 households.

== History ==
In 2021, Taher Gurab Rural District was separated from the Central District in the formation of Taher Gurab District, and Abatar Rural District was created in the new district.

== Other villages in the rural district ==
- Fatmeh Sar
- Kelid Bar
- Khoshtamdokh
- Kudeh
- Menareh Bazar
- Molla Sara
- Sharam
- Shekar Baghan
- Zarkam
