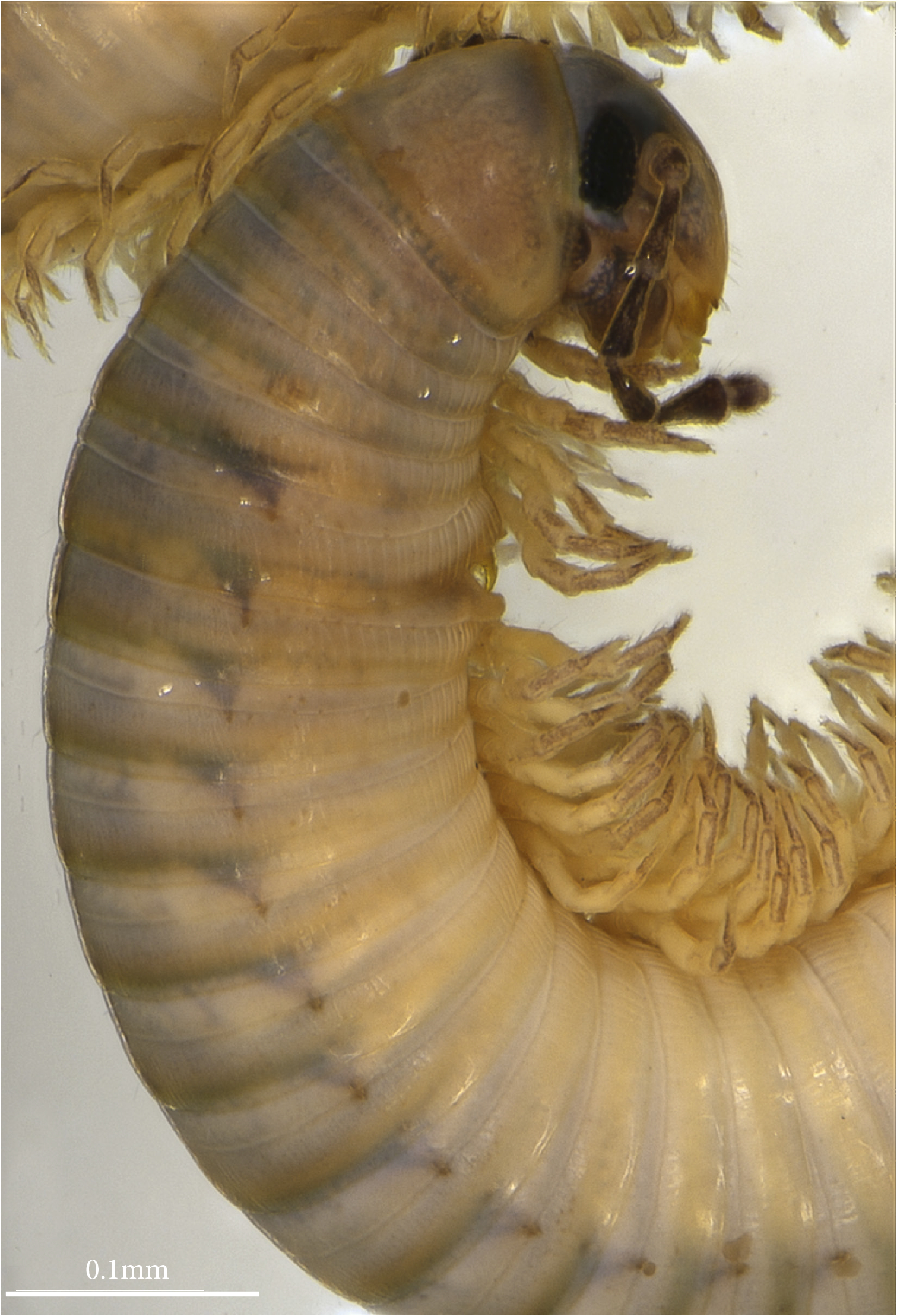

Scientific classification
- Kingdom: Animalia
- Phylum: Arthropoda
- Subphylum: Myriapoda
- Class: Diplopoda
- Order: Julida
- Family: Julidae
- Genus: Ommatoiulus
- Species: O. avatar

Binomial name
- Ommatoiulus avatar Akkari & Enghoff, 2015

= Ommatoiulus avatar =

Species of millipede

Ommatoiulus avatar is a species of European millipede in the family Julidae. Individuals are known from Andalusia, southern Spain. Individuals are 25 to 38 mm (0.98 to 1.50 in) long. Color in alcohol preserved specimens is brownish with yellowish and black marbling on the dorsal surface. O. avatar was described in 2015, with the aid of X-ray microtomography that produced a three-dimensional digital model, becoming the first millipede described from reference to physical type specimens as well as virtual models, known as "cybertypes".

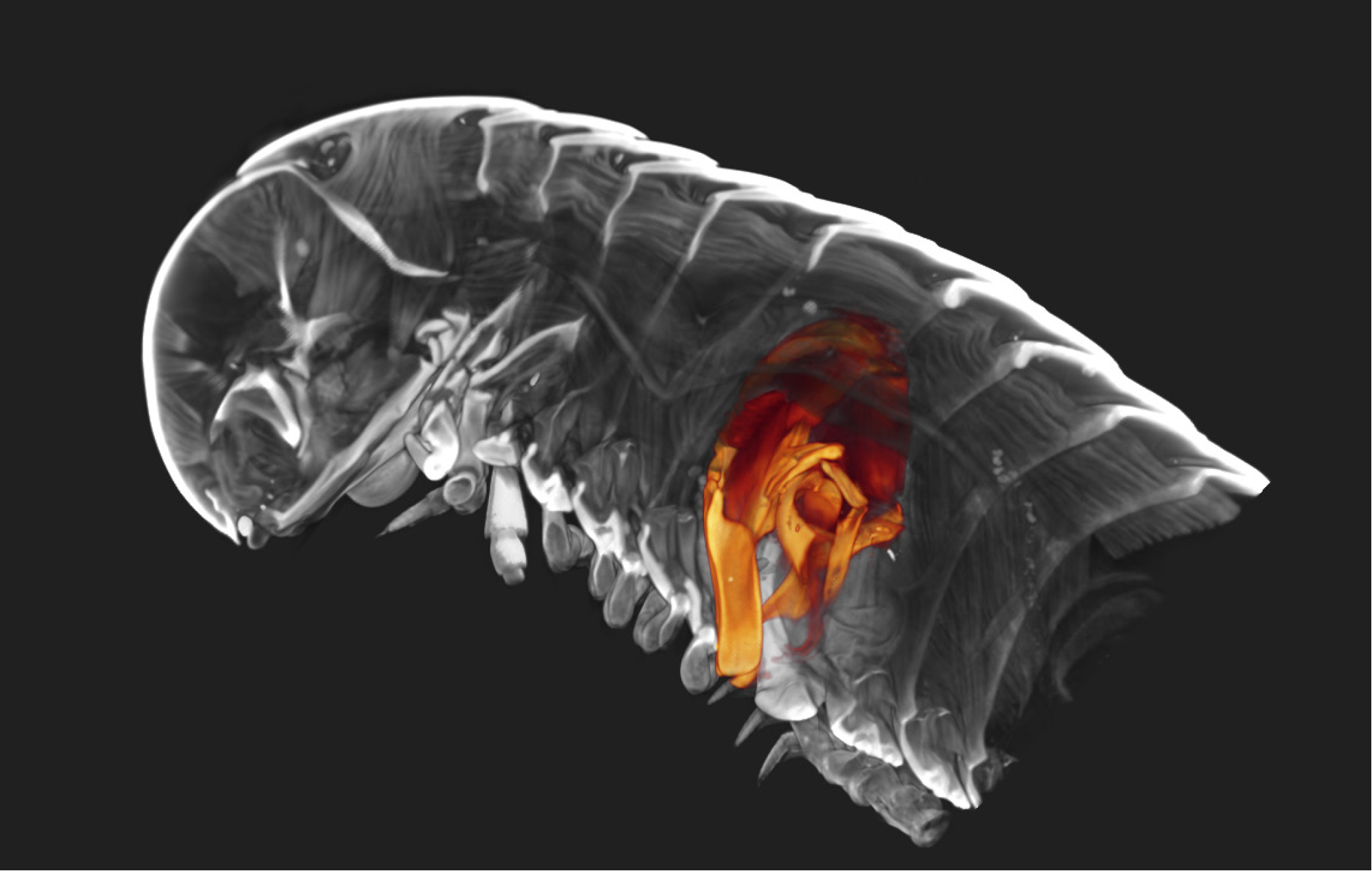
Virtual dissection of a male, with gonopods highlighted

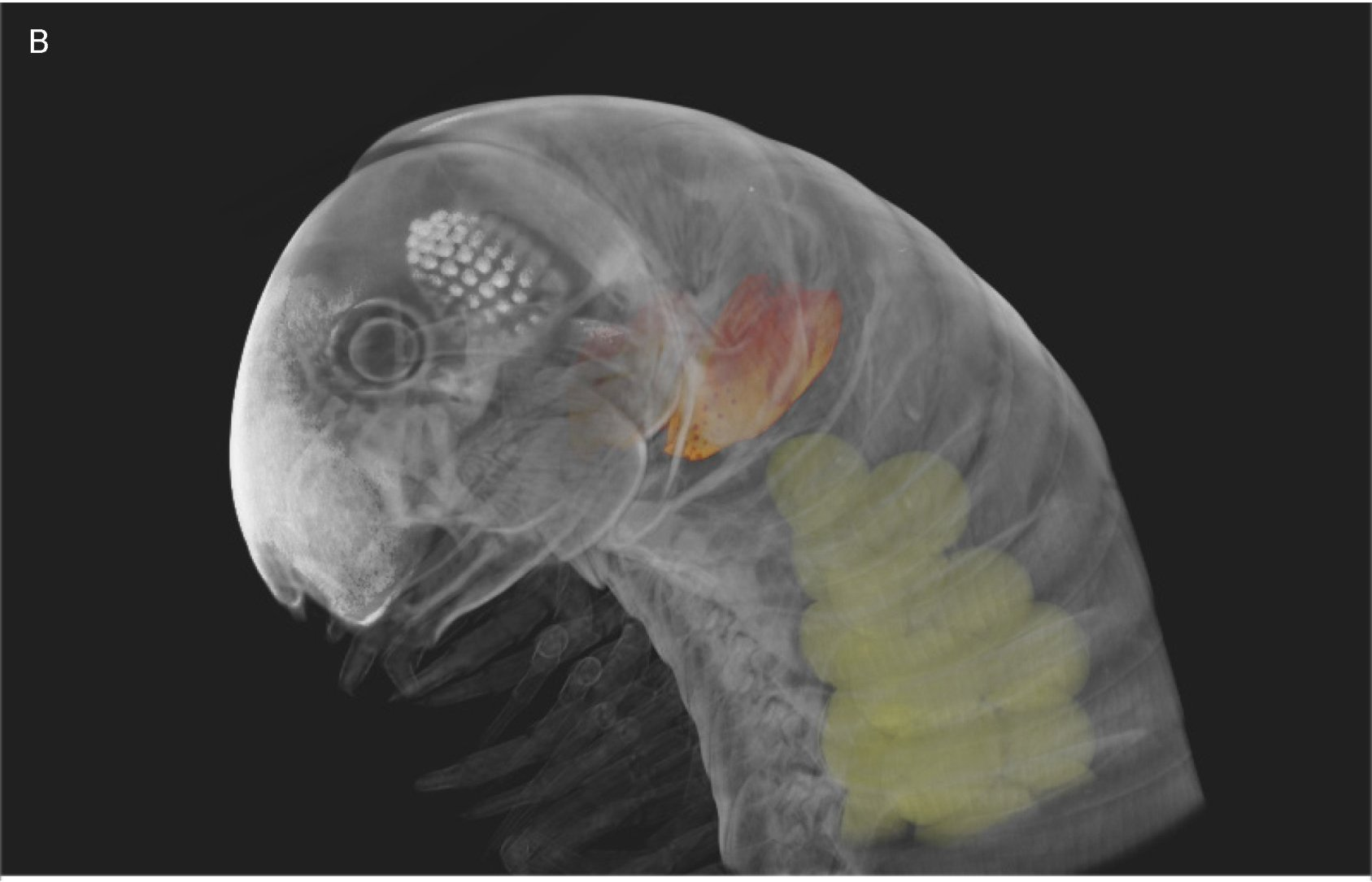
Virtual model of a female, with eggs and vulvae highlighted
