= Puruṣārtha (disambiguation) =

Puruṣārtha (Purushartha) is the object of human pursuit in Hinduism.

It may refer to:

- Puruşārthasiddhyupāya, a major Jain text
- Purushartham, a 1986 Indian film
