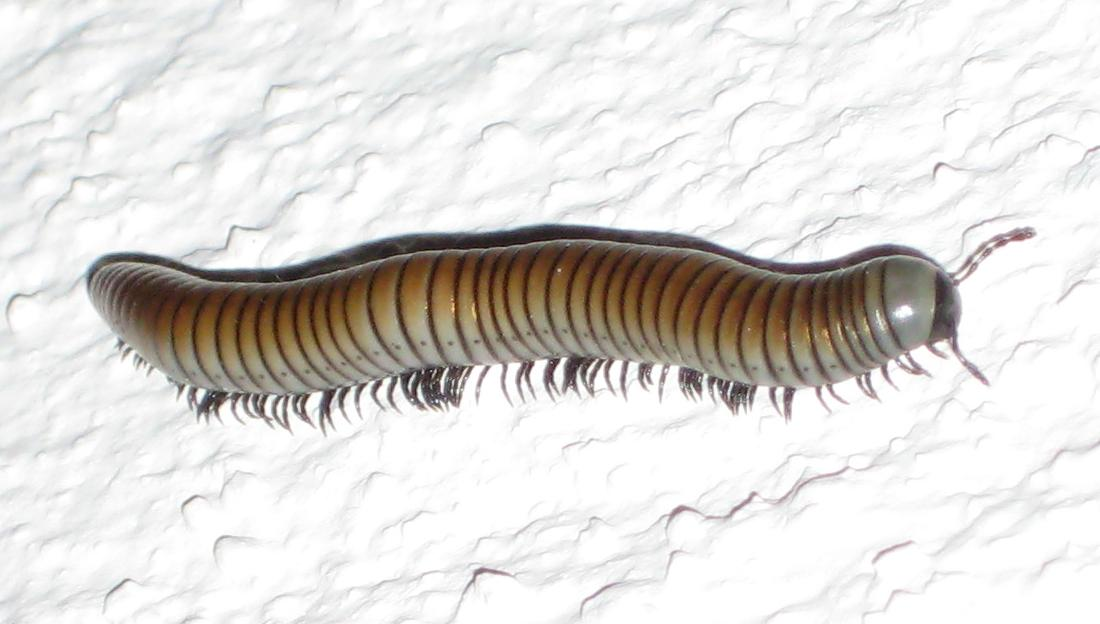
- Ommatoiulus rutilans on snow

Scientific classification
- Kingdom: Animalia
- Phylum: Arthropoda
- Subphylum: Myriapoda
- Class: Diplopoda
- Order: Julida
- Family: Julidae
- Genus: Ommatoiulus; Latzel, 1884

Synonyms
- Schizophyllum

= Ommatoiulus =

Genus of millipedes

Ommatoiulus is a genus of millipedes in the family Julidae.

The taxonomy of the genus has had a complicated history. As it stands now, there are approximately 60 described species, but this is likely to change. At least 10 new species were described in 2012, and those just from Spain. Six new species were described from Portugal in 2017. There are many millipedes known to belong to this genus that do not yet have official names.

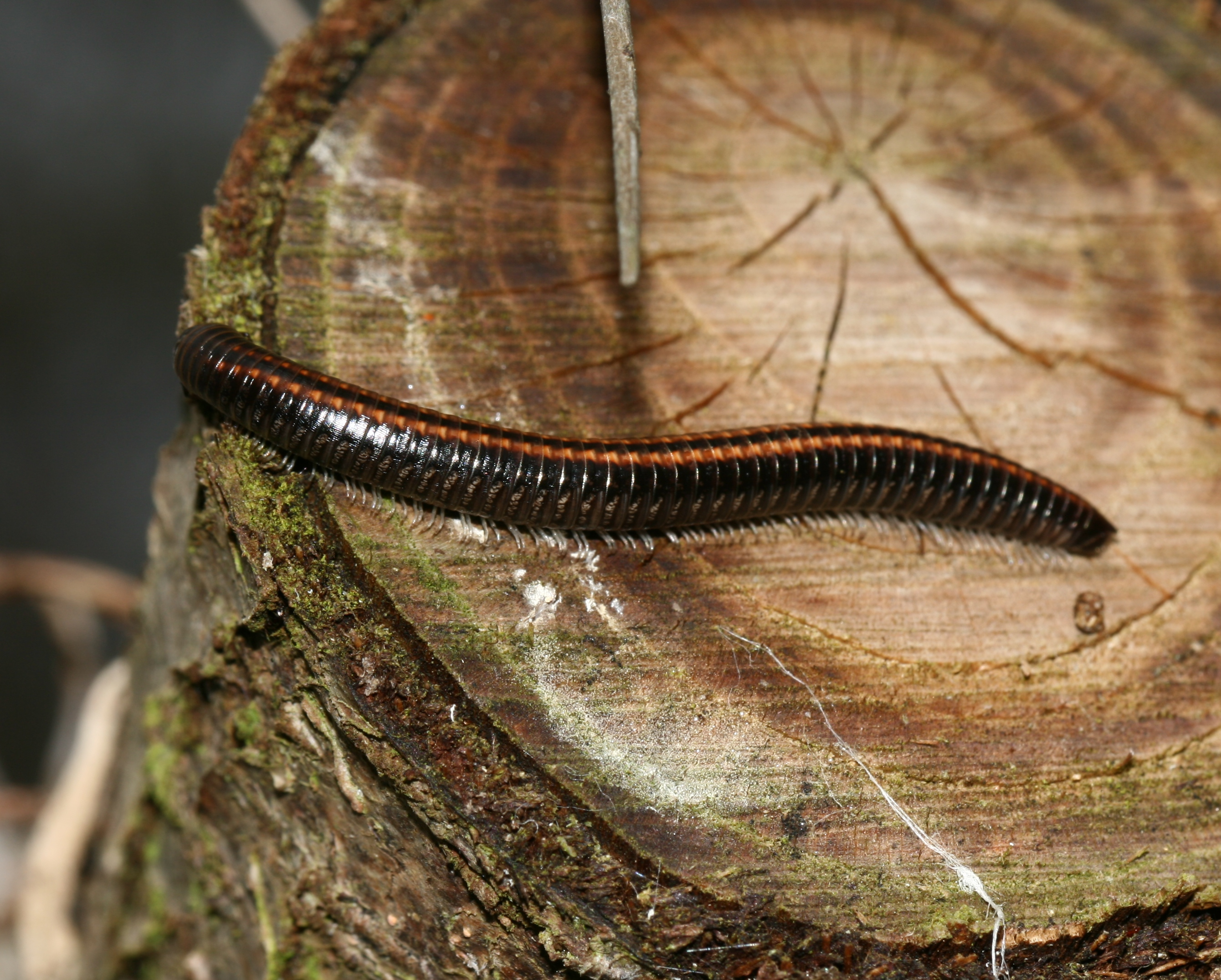
Ommatoiulus sabulosus

This genus is distinguished by the position of the ozopores, the shape of the ocelli and the gonopod legs, the presence of accessory claws on the juveniles, and the presence in males of a large fovea, a cavity where sperm are stored.

Familiar species include the black Portuguese millipede (Ommatoiulus moreletii). It is an invasive species in Australia known for its "plagues", when it emerges in swarms so massive that they stop trains, which crush them in huge numbers and make the rails slippery. Like some other millipedes, it produces a secretion with an obnoxious odor and tendency to stain floors when the swarms invade houses. Another well-known species is the striped millipede (O. sabulosus), which also swarms. In 2002 it flooded the streets of Dąbrowa Górnicza in Poland, "causing panic among the inhabitants". Swarms in France have consisted of "thousands of millions" of individuals, far too many to count. This species has also been known to stop trains.

Species include:

- Ommatoiulus alacygni
- Ommatoiulus andalusius
- Ommatoiulus aurozonatus
- Ommatoiulus avatar
- Ommatoiulus baenai
- Ommatoiulus baileyi
- Ommatoiulus bipartitus
- Ommatoiulus camurus
- Ommatoiulus caspius
- Ommatoiulus cingulatus
- Ommatoiulus denticulatus
- Ommatoiulus diplurus
- Ommatoiulus dorsovittatus
- Ommatoiulus fuentei
- Ommatoiulus fuscounilineatus
- Ommatoiulus hoffmani
- Ommatoiulus ibericus
- Ommatoiulus ilicis
- Ommatoiulus inconspicuus
- Ommatoiulus jaenensis
- Ommatoiulus kessleri
- Ommatoiulus kimei
- Ommatoiulus lapidarius
- Ommatoiulus litoralis
- Ommatoiulus lusitanus
- Ommatoiulus martensi
- Ommatoiulus moreletii
- Ommatoiulus navasi
- Ommatoiulus niger
- Ommatoiulus oliveirae
- Ommatoiulus oxypygus
- Ommatoiulus paralellus
- Ommatoiulus porathi
- Ommatoiulus pseudoflagellatus
- Ommatoiulus punicus
- Ommatoiulus recueroi
- Ommatoiulus reipi
- Ommatoiulus rutilans
- Ommatoiulus sabinarensis
- Ommatoiulus sabulosus
- Ommatoiulus schubarti
- Ommatoiulus staglae
- Ommatoiulus stellaris
- Ommatoiulus tetuanus
- Ommatoiulus vilnensis
