= Cyphopod =

Millipede anatomical structure

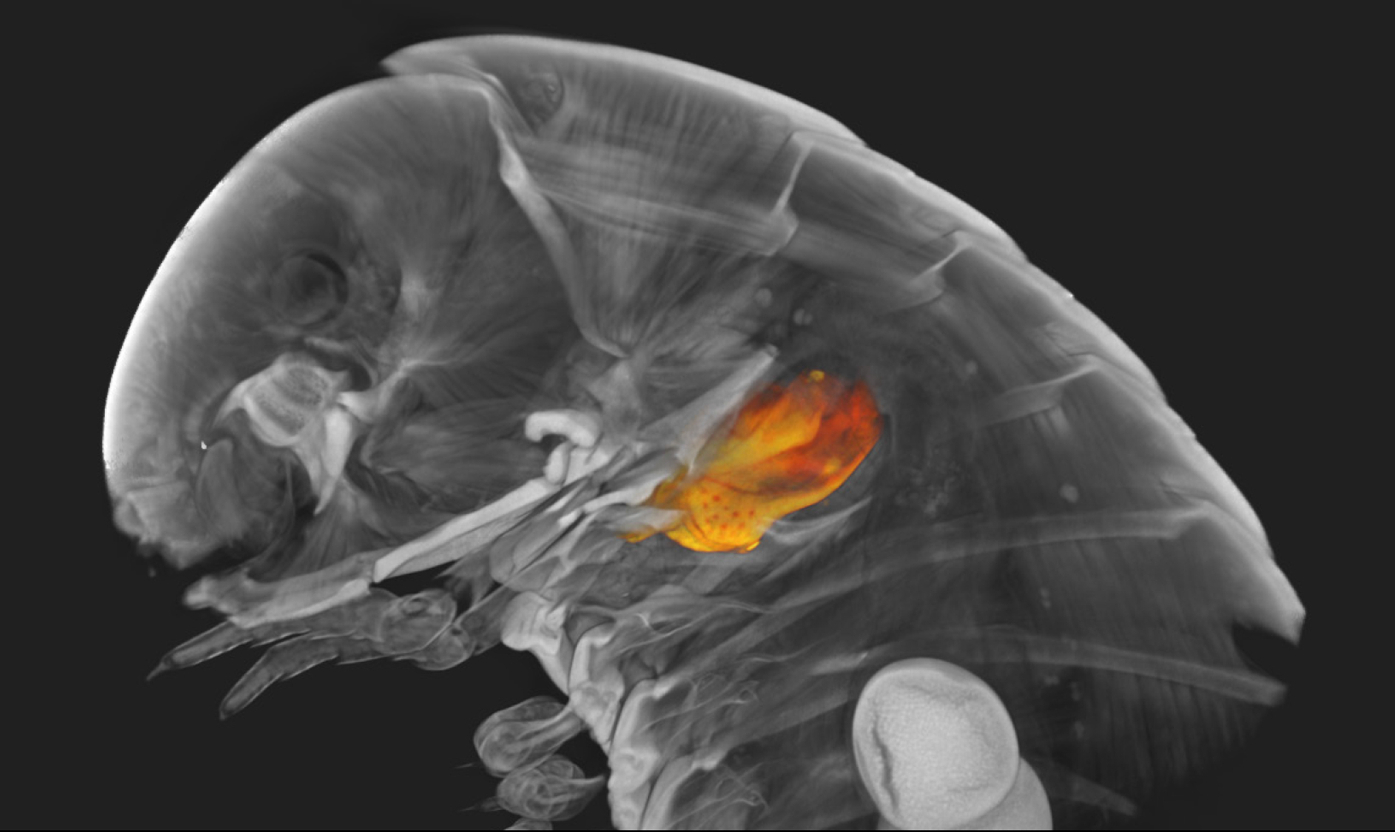
Location of cyphopods (highlighted) in Ommatoiulus avatar

Cyphopods, also known as vulvae, are paired sacs in female millipedes that located on the underside of the third body segment that store sperm and connect to the oviduct. Cyphopods are sclerotized, and usually hidden behind a small opening. Despite the connotation of the suffix -pod (generally referring to legs or feet), cyphopods are not derived from walking legs.

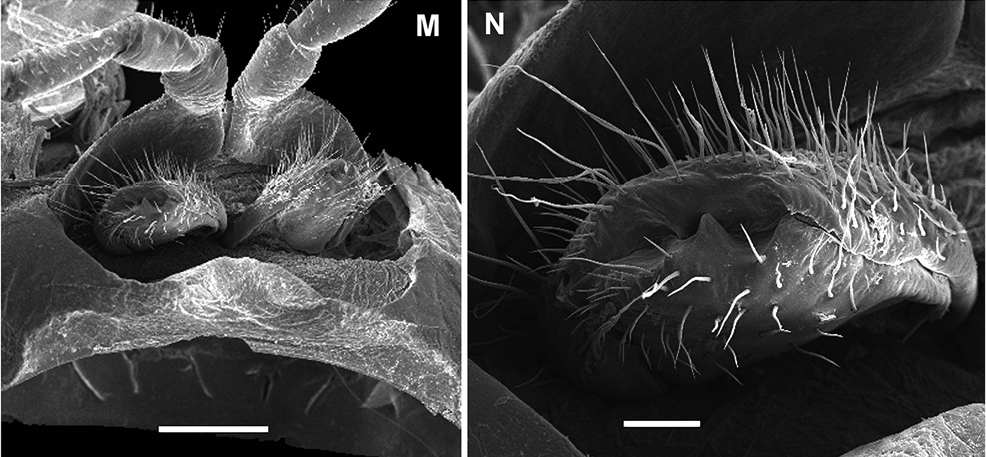
Cyphopd pair (left) and closeup of a single (right) in Eviulisoma
