= Avatar, Iran =

Avatar اواتر
- Village
- Location within Iran
- Coordinates: 36°21′28″N 50°50′24″E
- Country: Iran
- Province: Qazvin
- County: Qazvin
- Bakhsh: Rudbar-e Alamut
- Rural District: Alamut-e Pain

Population (2006)
  - Total: 59
- Time zone: UTC+3:30 (IRST)
  - Summer (DST): UTC+4:30 (IRDT)

Avatar (Persian: اواتر, also Romanized as Avātar) is a village in Alamut-e Pain Rural District, Rudbar-e Alamut District, Qazvin County, Qazvin Province, Iran. At the 2006 census, its population was 59, in 21 families.
