= Taher Gurab Rural District =

Rural district in Gilan province, Iran

Taher Gurab Rural District Persian: دهستان طاهرگوراب
- Rural District
- Location within Iran
- Coordinates: 37°23′N 49°13′E
- Country: Iran
- Province: Gilan
- County: Sowme'eh Sara
- District: Taher Gurab
- Established: 1987
- Capital: Now Kasht

Population (2016)
  - Total: 8,997
- Time zone: UTC+3:30 (IRST)

Taher Gurab Rural District (Persian: دهستان طاهرگوراب) is in Taher Gurab District of Sowme'eh Sara County, Gilan province, Iran. Its capital is the village of Now Kasht. The previous capital of the rural district was the village of Taher Gurab, now a city.

== Demographics ==
=== Population ===
At the time of the 2006 National Census, the rural district's population (as a part of the Central District) was 11,441 in 3,265 households. There were 10,497 inhabitants in 3,329 households at the following census of 2011. The 2016 census measured the population of the rural district as 8,997 in 3,179 households. The most populous of its 24 villages was Abatar (now the capital of Abatar Rural District), with 1,538 people.

In 2021, the rural district was separated from the district in the formation of Taher Gurab District.

=== Other villages in the rural district ===
- Asiab Sar
- Chaman
- Jadeh Kenar
- Khaneh Kenar
- Kolangestan
- Kord Mahalleh
- Mahmud Kian
- Moaf-e Owmandan
- Molk Sar
- Owmandan
- Patavan
- Poshtir
- Rajir
- Visheh Sara
- Ziksar
