= Taher Gurab District =

District in Gilan province, Iran

Taher Gurab District Persian: بخش طاهرگوراب
- District
- Location within Iran
- Coordinates: 37°23′N 49°15′E
- Country: Iran
- Province: Gilan
- County: Sowme'eh Sara
- Established: 2021
- Capital: Taher Gurab
- Time zone: UTC+3:30 (IRST)

Taher Gurab District (Persian: بخش طاهرگوراب) is in Sowme'eh Sara County, Gilan province, Iran. Its capital is the city of Taher Gurab, whose population as a village at the time of the 2016 National Census was 1,168 people in 396 households.

== History ==
In 2021, Taher Gurab Rural District was separated from the Central District in the formation of Taher Gurab District. The village of Taher Gurab was converted to a city in 2023.

== Demographics ==
=== Administrative divisions ===
Taher Gurab District
Administrative Divisions
Abatar RD
Taher Gurab RD
Taher Gurab (city)
RD = Rural District
