= List of cities, towns and villages in Lorestan province =

A list of cities, towns and villages in Lorestan Province of western Iran:

== Alphabetical ==
Cities are in bold text; all others are villages.

=== A ===
Ab Barik | Ab Barik | Ab Barik-e Olya | Ab Barik-e Olya | Ab Barik-e Sofla | Ab Barik-e Sofla | Ab Bariki | Ab Bid Kardakaneh | Ab Bid | Ab Dar | Ab Difeh | Ab Garmag | Ab Garmeh | Ab Gazag | Ab Kaseh | Ab Rahmat | Ab Rizak | Ab Sardeh-ye Alai | Ab Shabandar | Ab Zahreh Pirmar | Abbas Barfi | Abbas Khan | Abbasabad Poshteh | Abbasabad | Abbasabad | Abbasabad | Abbasabad | Abbasabad | Abbasabad-e Kani Kabud | Abbas-e Kalpat | Abbasi | Abbasi | Abchi | Abd ol Hoseyni | Abdal Beygi Mohammadi | Abdolabad | Abdolabad-e Kani Kabud | Abduli Zalyab | Abgarmak-e Olya | Abgarmak-e Olya | Abgarmak-e Sofla | Abkot | Absardeh | Absardeh | Abu ol Vafai | Abulabad-e Gilavand | Abuzar | Adal | Adelabad | Adlabad | Afravandeh | Afrineh | Ahangaran | Ahangaran-e Olya | Ahangaran-e Sofla | Ahangari | Ahmad Hasan | Ahmadabad | Ahmadabad | Ahmadabad | Ahmadabad | Ahmadkhan | Ahmadvand | Aileh | Akbarabad | Akbarabad | Akbarabad | Akbarabad | Akbarabad | Akhowr Khash | Alamabad | Alamabad | Alamabad-e Olya | Alamabad-e Sofla | Alefsaneh | Aleshtar | Ali Asgar | Ali Mahmud | Ali Mehdi | Ali Mirzai-ye Olya | Ali Mirzai-ye Sofla | Ali Mohammad Beygi | Ali Mohammad Zeytun | Aliabad Cheragh | Aliabad Darreh Moshk | Aliabad Jadid | Aliabad Nazar Alivand | Aliabad Parsaneh | Aliabad Piameni | Aliabad | Aliabad | Aliabad | Aliabad | Aliabad | Aliabad | Aliabad | Aliabad | Aliabad | Aliabad | Aliabad-e Bar Aftab | Aliabad-e Bar Anazar | Aliabad-e Chahi | Aliabad-e Gavkosh | Aliabad-e Javanmard | Aliabad-e Olya | Aliabad-e Pirdusti | Aliabad-e Sofla | Aligudarz | Alimorad Khan | Alinabad | Alir | Alishah | Alkabad | Allah Beygi | Almasabad | Almaskhan | Alqasabad | Alun Abbasi | Amar | | Amirabad | Amirabad Cham Gaz | Amirabad Haq Nader | Amirabad | Amirabad | Amirabad | Amirabad-e Nadar | Amir-e Olya | Amir-e Sofla | Anar Rud Borzog | Anardar-e Bala | Anardar-e Pain | Anarestan | Anbarteh-e Sofla | Andikan | Angaz Rustai Shehidarhimi | Angoshteh | Anjirisheh | Anuj-e Olya | Anuj-e Sofla | Aq Bolagh-e Mohammad Vali | Aqa Baba Shiravand | Aqa Mohammad | Aqa Vali | Aqai | Aqai | Aqajan | Aqbolagh | Araban | Araban | Ardesi | Ardudar | Asad Khani | Asad Koshteh | Asadabad | Asadabad | Asadabad | Asadabad | Asadabad-e Chenar | Asadabad-e Olya | Asadabad-e Sofla | Asadabad-e Vosta | Asadabad-e Vosta | Asar Zamin-e Kaliab | Asar | Asemandul | Asgaran | Asgharabad | Asgharabad | Asgharabad | Ashrafabad | Ashrafabad | Ashurabad | Asiavaleh | Aslan Shahi | Aslani Mohammad Reza | Asmahur-e Olya | Asmahur-e Sofla | Aspi Razil | Avareh | Avaseh Amid Ali | Ayazabad | Azad Bakht-e Korreh Pa | Azadabad-e Pir Dusti | Azadkhani | Azadkhani | Aziz Koshteh | Azizabad | Azizabad | Azizabad | Azizabad | Azizabad | Azizabad-e Pain | Azizabad-e Qeytasvand | Azna Mehalmak | Azna | Azna |

=== B ===
Baba Bahram | Baba Bozorg | Baba Dineh | Baba Gerd Ali | Baba Julan | Baba Khani | Baba Khani | Baba Khvarazm-e Karim | Baba Khvarazm-e Mojir | Baba Khvarazm-e Olya | Baba Mahmud-e Olya | Baba Mahmud-e Vosta | Baba Mohammad | Baba Mohammad Sanjabi | Baba Pashman | Baba Qoli | Baba Zeyd | Babaali | Babajan | Bad Bad | Badam Shirin | Badam Shirin | Badarah-ye Olya | Badarah-ye Sofla | Badeh | Badeh | Badiyeh-ye Do | Badiyeh-ye Seh | Badiyeh-ye Yek | Badrabad-e Sofla | Bag Reza | Bagh Ali-ye Olya | Bagh Ali-ye Sofla | Bagh Anab | Bagh Bisheh | Bagh Dai-ye Olya | Bagh Dai-ye Sofla | Bagh Kerah | Bagh Muri | Bagh Pay Astan | Bagh | Bagh-e Gol Gol | Bagh-e Jamal | Bagh-e Latifan | Bagh-e Olya | Bagh-e Sofla | Baghelah-ye Olya | Baghelah-ye Sofla | Bagverdi-ye Olya | Bagverdi-ye Sofla | Bagverdi-ye Vosta | Baharabad | Baharkar | Bahram Beyg | Bahram Kosh-e Mirza | Bahramabad | Bahramabad-e Olya | Bahramabad-e Sofla | Bahrami | Bahramju | Bakbarabad-e Pir Dusti | Bakhshi Varz | Balavan | Balut Bazeh | Balut Beyg | Balutban | Bamsar-e Bala | Bana Zardeh | Band Jub-e Do | Baneh | Bang Puleh | Bang | Bapir Vali Allah | Baqerabad | Baqla Kuh | Bar Aftab | Bar Aftab-e Ali Asgar | Bar Aftab-e Deraz | Bar Aftab-e Ghazal | Bar Aftab-e Humeh | Bar Bar Marg Sar | Barafi | Baraftab | Baraftab-e Seyd Mohammad | Barakatabad | Bardastemal | Bardbol | Bardbol | Bardbol | Bardeh Gar-e Do Vark | Bardeh Sareh | Bardeh-ye Fateh | Bareh Anar | Bareh Jula | Bareh Kalak | Bareh Kheyreh | Bareh Sheykhali | Bareh Tork | Bareh-ye Seyyed Ahmad | Bargalan Sukhteh | Barg-e Najaf | Barikeh | Barkhvordar | Barzan | Barzeh | Basat Beygi | Basatabad | Basatabad | Bavaki-ye Amir Bakhtiar | Bavileh | Bavlin | Bayatan | Bayatan | Bayranshahr | Bazabad | Bazgir | Bazvandi | Behdaq | Behzadabad | Belilvand | Benarkabud-e Do | Benarkabud-e Seh | Benarkabud-e Yek | Benjufeyzi | Benruteleh | Berahma | Beralikeh | Berekeh | Beshteh Var | Besri | Betaki | Bichun-e Pain | Bid Gijeh | Bid Hal | Bid Kalmeh | Bid Qatar-e Olya | Bid Qatar-e Sofla | Bidestan | Bidestaneh | Bisheh Khazan | Bisheh Zardeh | Bisheh | Bizhanvand | Boluran | Bomarsheh | Bon Abbas | Bon Abbas Gol Bag Mir | Bon Karreh-ye Kohzadvand | Bon Keshkeh | Bon Lar | Bon Mazraeh | Bon Tuman-e Seh | Bon Tuman-e Yek | Bonakabad | Bondizeh | Boneh Ju | Boneh Lasheh | Boneh Var-e Yaqub | Bontang | Bord Luseh | Borj-e Kabud | Borjeleh | Borm | Bornabad | Borujerd | Bostan Rud Sharaf | Bovaki | Boz Hal | Bozab | Bozdash | Boz-e Azna | Budineh | Buganeh Razbashi | Bukeh Dar | Bun Pahneh | Burbur-e Olya | Burbur-e Sofla | Burbur-e Vosta | Buryabaf

=== C ===
Chafteh Darreh-ye Olya | Chafteh Darreh-ye Sofla | Chafteh Darreh-ye Vosta | Chaghal Kan | Chah Cheragh | Chah Kheyr | Chah Qazi | Chah Reza | Chahar Ab | Chahar Afshar-e Sofla | Chahar Barreh | Chahar Cheshmeh-ye Nazem | Chahar Gush | Chahar Meleh Gel Sorkheh | Chahar Qaleh-ye Barani | Chahar Qaleh-ye Olya | Chahar Qaleh-ye Sadat | Chahar Qaleh-ye Sofla | Chahar Qaleh-ye Vosta | Chahar Takhteh | Chah-e Zu ol Faqar | Chahzal | Chakan Hoseynabad | Chak-e Sabz Olya | Chal Ab Morad Ali | Chal Ashkuh | Chal Bardin | Chal Duguneh | Chal Gerd | Chal Gerd-e Keshtvarzeh | Chal Gharu | Chal Qaleh | Chal Seyl | Chal Seyyed Ali | Chal Suz | Chal Tella | Chalanchulan | Chaleh Chaleh | Chaleh Pahreh | Chaleh | Chaleh | Chaleh-ye Kamalvand | Chalgaz | Chalkal-e Sofla | Chalshir | Cham Anjir | Cham Anjir | Cham Bagh | Cham Bagh-e Sofla | Cham Borreh | Cham Chareh Du | Cham Chareh Seh | Cham Chit | Cham Choqa | Cham Choqal-e Sofla | Cham Chul | Cham Davud | Cham Deylavand-e Olya | Cham Deylavand-e Sofla | Cham Gaz | Cham Gerdab | Cham Gerdeleh-ye Olya | Cham Gerdeleh-ye Sofla | Cham Geredeleh-ye Vosta | Cham Hesar | Cham Kabud | Cham Kabud-e Olya | Cham Kabud-e Vosta | Cham Karim | Cham Khusheh | Cham Khusheh Safar Ali | Cham Kushk-e Tulabi | Cham Mehr-e Bala | Cham Mehr-e Pain | Cham Mokhtar | Cham Palak | Cham Puneh | Cham Qabrestan | Cham Qabrestan | Cham Qaleh | Cham Qaleh | Cham Qamar | Cham Qoroq | Cham Rastamian | Cham Sangar | Cham Seyl | Cham Seyyedi-ye Olya | Cham Seyyedi-ye Sofla | Cham Seyyedi-ye Vosta | Cham Shahi | Cham Shateh-ye Sofla | Cham Shekar | Cham Takleh-ye Olya | Cham Takleh-ye Sofla | Cham Zel-e Shahali | Cham Zereshk | Chaman Buleh | Chaman Jafar Beyg | Chaman Soltan | Cham-e Aqamordeh | Cham-e Astan | Cham-e Borzu | Cham-e Divan | Cham-e Gorgali | Cham-e Heydar | Cham-e Heydar | Cham-e Latur | Cham-e Mir Beyg | Cham-e Murt | Cham-e Murt | Cham-e Qahreman | Cham-e Qalandar | Cham-e Qalateh | Cham-e Shahran | Cham-e Vazir | Chamnar | Changai | Chapdar | Chapit-e Olya | Chapit-e Sofla | Chaqa Bahram | Chaqabal | Chaqabol | Chaqabol | Chaqabol | Chaqalvand Rud-e Olya | Chaqalvand Rud-e Sofla | Chaqataram | Charaghabad Pir Dusti | Charaki | Charkhestan | Charkhestaneh | Charkhestaneh | Charkhestaneh | Charu Gereh | Chegini Kosh | Chel Riz | Chelan | Chelehban | Chenar Bagali | Chenar Gerit | Chenar Hamam | Chenar Heyl | Chenar Khatun | Chenar Kheyri | Chenar Khoshkeh | Chenar Kol | Chenar Shureh | Chenar | Chenar | Chenar | Chenaran | Chenar-e Bala | Chenar-e Dom Chehr Qoralivand | Chenar-e Golaban | Chenar-e Kaliab | Chenar-e Mishakhvor | Chenar-e Modvi-e Bala | Chenar-e Modvi-e Pain | Chenar-e Pain | Chenar-e Razbashi | Chenar-e Sofla | Chenareh | Chenareh-ye Olya | Chenareh-ye Sofla | Chenarestan | Cheqa Gorg | Cheqa Vaqfi | Cheragh | Cheraghabad Cham Nus | Cheraghabad | Cheraghabad-e Olya | Cheraghabad-e Sofla | Cherbas | Cherush-e Itivand | Cheshmeh Ali | Cheshmeh Barad | Cheshmeh Barani | Cheshmeh Barqi | Cheshmeh Bid Cheng Baradeh | Cheshmeh Bid | Cheshmeh Borjali | Cheshmeh Dara | Cheshmeh Dargah | Cheshmeh Darreh | Cheshmeh Gasheh | Cheshmeh Gush Latif | Cheshmeh Jamileh | Cheshmeh Kabud | Cheshmeh Kabud | Cheshmeh Kabud | Cheshmeh Kabud | Cheshmeh Kabud | Cheshmeh Kabud | Cheshmeh Kalan | Cheshmeh Kamareh | Cheshmeh Kareh | Cheshmeh Khani | Cheshmeh Khani | Cheshmeh Khani-ye Olya | Cheshmeh Khani-ye Sofla | Cheshmeh Kuh Hoseynabad | Cheshmeh Kuzan-e Olya | Cheshmeh Mirza | Cheshmeh Murineh | Cheshmeh Par | Cheshmeh Paryan | Cheshmeh Rashnow | Cheshmeh Saleh | Cheshmeh Sardeh | Cheshmeh Sardeh-ye Olya | Cheshmeh Sarnajeh | Cheshmeh Sefid | Cheshmeh Sefid | Cheshmeh Sefid-e Olya | Cheshmeh Sefid-e Sofla | Cheshmeh Soltan | Cheshmeh Sorkheh | Cheshmeh Sorkheh Mohammadi | Cheshmeh Sorkheh Seyyed Reza | Cheshmeh Tala | Cheshmeh Tala | Cheshmeh Zalikha | Cheshmeh-ye Ali Akbar | Cheshmeh-ye Cheragh Ali | Cheshmeh-ye Hajji Mohammad | Cheshmeh-ye Mirza Hoseyn | Cheshmeh-ye Papi | Cheshmeh-ye Shah Qoli | Cheshmeh-ye Zamzam | Cheyabel | Chiabaleh | Chiabaleh Pain | Chin Zal | Chiti | Chiyeh | Chogha Darmian | Chogha Darmian Duan Shir | Chogha Horushi | Chogha Sabz-e Khoda Nazar | Chogha Soleyman | Choqa Khandaq | Choqa Mushan | Choqa Sabz-e Naqd-e Ali | Choqabdar | Choqapur Aliabad | Chub Bor | Chub Tarash Mian Golal | Chub Tarash | Chubdar-e Olya | Chubdar-e Pain | Chub-e Arjaneh | Chughadun | Chujar | Chul | Chulan Deym | Chulan-e Abi | Chutash-e Yekshanbeh | Chyasvareh Sheykh Ahmad

=== D ===
Dadagolab | Dah Baradar | Dahleh Sufian | Dahleh | Daichi | Dakamavand-e Olya | Dakamavand-e Sofla | Dalab-e Bala | Dalab-e Pain | Dam Bagh Yusefabad | Dam Dam | Damgar | Danah Misi | Dangi-ye Akbarabad | Dar Aghol Begir-e Latif | Dar Balut-e Olya | Dar Balut-e Sofla | Dar Eshgaft-e Baba Bahram | Dar Gel-e Kheyrali | Dar Howz | Dar Kul | Dar Kul | Dar Numeh | Dar Pir Abbas | Dar Tang-e Olya | Dar Tang-e Sofla | Darabi | Darah Serah Bavineh | Darai | Daramru | Darazamstani Gadarkeh | Darbagheh | Darband | Darband-e Kamalvand | Darb-e Astaneh | Darb-e Astaneh Khalid Ebn Ali | Darb-e Chah | Darb-e Gonbad | Darber-e Razbashi | Darbid Haft Cheshmeh-e Olya | Darbid Haft Cheshmeh-e Sofla | Darbid-e Olya | Darbid-e Sofla | Darbid-e Vosta | Darbid-e Zangivand | Dardamel-e Hoseynali | Dareshgaft | Dareshgeft | Dareshgeft | Daricheh | Darkubi | Darmahi | Darmareh | Darmian | Darreh Bagh | Darreh Bagh | Darreh Bagh | Darreh Besar | Darreh Bidad-e Olya | Darreh Bidad-e Sofla | Darreh Chapi | Darreh Cheh | Darreh Chin | Darreh Dang | Darreh Deh | Darreh Deraz | Darreh Duzdan | Darreh Esbar | Darreh Garm | Darreh Garm | Darreh Giri | Darreh Hadavand | Darreh Hendian | Darreh Heydar | Darreh Kabud | Darreh Khazineh | Darreh Khvoshi | Darreh Lir | Darreh Mahi Olya | Darreh Mahi Sofla | Darreh Morad | Darreh Naqdi | Darreh Naqi | Darreh Naru | Darreh Rahmaneh | Darreh Saki | Darreh Saki | Darreh Saki-ye Olya | Darreh Saki-ye Sofla | Darreh Seydi | Darreh Seyyed | Darreh Shureh | Darreh Takht | Darreh Tang | Darreh Tarik | Darreh Yadegar | Darreh Zagheh-ye Bala | Darreh Zhan-e Bala | Darreh Zhan-e Pain | Darreh Zuleh | Darreh-ye Abbas | Darreh-ye Badam | Darreh-ye Bizhan-e Olya | Darreh-ye Bizhan-e Sofla | Darreh-ye Bizhan-e Vosta | Darreh-ye Dah Pahlavan | Darreh-ye Mohammad Qoli | Darreh-ye Qasem Ali | Darsafeh | Darsidgol | Darsun | Darti | Darti | Dartil | Darvaz Now | Darvazeh | Darvishabad | Darvishabad | Darvishabad | Darvishan Sarbisheh | Daryab | Dast Bezanu | Dastgerd | Dastgerd | Davarijan | Davud Rashid | Davudak | Davud-e Peyghambar | Davudkhatar | Defkandar | Deh Ali Qoli | Deh Darvishan | Deh Firuzvand-e Bala | Deh Firuzvand-e Pain | Deh Firuzvand-e Vosta | Deh Gorzeh | Deh Jani | Deh Kabud-e Chovari | Deh Khosrow | Deh Kord | Deh Mahmud Hoseyn | Deh Mirza Qoli | Deh Nasar | Deh Now Pirjed | Deh Now | Deh Now | Deh Now | Deh Now | Deh Now | Deh Now-e Karam Ali | Deh Now-ye Moqaddasi | Deh Par | Deh Qadi | Deh Riz | Deh Sefid Darvish | Deh Sefid Karim | Deh Sefid | Deh Sefid | Deh Sefid-e Olya | Deh Sefid-e Sofla | Deh Sefid-e Vosta | Deh Seyd-e Kesht Varzeh | Deh Shahi | Deh Sorkheh | Deh Sorkheh | Deh Tushmal | Deh Yusefan-e Olya | Deh Yusefan-e Sofla | Deh-e Aqa | Deh-e Baqer | Deh-e Borzu | Deh-e Bozorg | Deh-e Bozorg | Deh-e Hajji | Deh-e Hasanali | Deh-e Mohsen | Deh-e Nasir | Deh-e Now | Deh-e Now | Deh-e Now-e Abdolvand | Deh-e Nowruz | Deh-e Rahm | Deh-e Salman | Deh-e Sefid Kan Sorkh | Deh-e Sefid Salianeh | Deh-e Seyyed | Deh-e Sheykhan | Deh-e Torkan | Deh-e Yusof Ali | Dehgah | Dehgah | Dehgah | Dehlich | Dehmennatali | Dehnow Aligar | Dehnow | Dehnow | Del Suran | Delbar Sadat | Delbar-e Rok Rok | Deli Zal Beyg | Deliabad | Delyan | Depeh | Derakht Chaman | Derazi | Derj | Deyvand | Dimandul | Dinarabad | Dinarvand-e Olya | Dinarvand-e Sofla | Do Ab | Do Bolukan | Do Khvaharan | Do Kuheh-ye Rashnow | Do Sar | Doab-e Zali | Dom Darreh Humian | Dom Kamar | Dom Qaleh | Dom Rustan | Dom Zalab | Domrud-e Amir-e Olya | Domrud-e Amir-e Sofla | Domrud-e Amir-e Vosta | Domrud-e Olya | Domrud-e Sofla | Dorcheh | Dorud | Dorudgaran | Dow Ab-e Zivdar | Dow Dangeh | Dowlatabad | Dowlatabad | Dowlatshahi | Dul Bid | Dul Gaz-e Rajabali | Dul Qabarstan | Dulabi-ye Badamak | Dul-e Gap | Duliskan-e Olya | Duliskan-e Sofla | Duliskan-e Vosta | Durak | Durak | Duran Darreh | Dust Mohammad | Duzan

=== E ===
Ebrahimabad | Emamqoli | Emamzadeh Mohammad Hasan | Emamzadeh Qasem | Emarat | Eshaqabad | Eshtareh-ye Gol Gol | Eskin-e Olya | Eskin-e Sofla | Eslamabad Barg Beydi | Eslamabad Gamasyab Olya | Eslamabad Gamasyab Sofla | Eslamabad Mahmud Hoseyn | Eslamabad | Eslamabad | Eslamabad | Eslamabad | Eslamabad-e Olya | Eslamabad-e Olya | Eslamabad-e Sofla | Esmailabad | Eylar | Eynatan | Eyvandar | Eyvani | Eyvashan Golestan | Eyvashan Seyl

=== F ===
Fahreh | Fakhrabad-e Olya | Falak od Din | Farah Kosh-e Olya | Farah Kosh-e Sofla | Faraj Alahi | Farengeh | Farhadabad | Farhadabad | Farmanabad | Farrokhabad-e Olya | Farrokhabad-e Olya | Farrokhabad-e Sofla | Farsesh | Farzali | Farzian | Fathabad | Fathabad | Fathabad | Fathallahabad | Fathiabad-e Chaleh Chaleh | Fattahabad | Fazelabad | Feyzabad | Fial | Fila | Fiqan | Firuzabad

=== G ===
Gach Bandi | Gach Keykhvah | Gachi | Gadpuk | Galeh Bardar | Galeh Mu | Galeh Yar | Galeh | Galleh Gah | Galleh Kur | Gallehvand | Gand Ab | Gandab | Gandabeh | Gandabeh | Gandabeh | Gandom Ban Habib Vand | Gandomineh | Ganj Darreh-ye Olya | Ganj Darreh-ye Sofla | Ganjali | Ganjali-e Sofla | Ganjineh | Ganjineh-ye Zaruni | Garab Kuchek | Garab | Garab | Garazh | Garazh | Gardangah-e Shahali | Gardel Mehr | Gareh | Gareh | Garehimageh | Gari Babakhan | Gari Eslamabad | Gari Sarab | Garisan | Garkan-e Olya | Garkan-e Sofla | Garkhashab | Garm Khani | Garmabalah-ye Olya | Garmabalah-ye Sofla | Garmeh Khani | Garmeh Khani | Garmurt-e Nosrati | Garmut-e Ramazanabad | Garvazir | Gasehabad | Gashur-e Aliabad | Gashur-e Amirabad | Gashur-e Qaleh Mohammad | Gav Bazeh | Gav Kosh-e Olya | Gav Kosh-e Sofla | Gav Kosh-e Vosta | Gav Koshteh | Gavarsaleh | Gavbar-e Sofla | Gavdaneh Pa | Gavgir-e Chamdaneh | Gavmer | Gavrah Zakar | Gaygan | Gazeh | Gazleh | Gelam Kabud | Gel-e Gurchak | Geligerd | Gelvaran-e Bala | Gelvaran-e Pain | Gerdab | Gerdakaneh Sanjabi | Gerdakaneh | Gerehbid | Gheybi | Gholamabad-e Khayyat | Gholaman-e Olya | Gholaman-e Sofla | Gijali-ye Bala | Gijali-ye Pain | Gilan | Gilavand | Girchan | Girchan | Girj Gerdeh | Godarpahan | Gol Baghi | Gol Besar | Gol Darreh | Gol Darreh | Gol Dulatshahi | Gol Gol-e Olya | Gol Gol-e Sofla | Gol Nazar | Gol Sefid | Gol Zard | Gol Zard | Gol Zard | Gol Zard-e Bala | Gol Zard-e Pain | Golagheh Mordeh | Golah Veys | Golam Bahri | Golbahar-e Atabaki | Golbahar-e Olya | Golbahar-e Sheykh Miri | Golbahar-e Sofla | Golbahar-e Yusefabad | Golchehran | Goldasht | Gol-e Zard | Golestan | Golestanak | Golestaneh | Golestaneh | Golgiyi | Goli Chas | Golzar | Gombeh | Gombeleh | Gonarvand | Gondal Gilan | Gorg Aliabad | Gorgalan | Gori Balmak | Goriran-e Olya | Goriran-e Sofla | Gorji | Gorz Kol | Gowhar Gush | Gruni Mahdi Fuladvand | Gulab-e Sofla | Gulab-e Vosta | Gur Mavali | Gur Mohammad | Gurahan-e Cham Shahivand | Guran | Guri Sabz | Guri Sabz Babakhan | Gusheh | Gusheh-ye Mohsen Ebn-e Ali | Gusheh-ye Pol | Guyzheh-ye Bala |

=== H ===
Hadiabad | Haft Cheshmeh | Haft Cheshmeh | Haft Cheshmeh | Haft Cheshmeh | Haft Cheshmeh | Haft Khvani | Hajatan | Hajj Khadijeh | Hajjali | Hajji Morad | Hajji Morad | Hajjiabad Beshaq | Hajjiabad Darvish | Hajjiabad | Hajjiabad | Hajjiabad | Hajjiabad | Hajjiabad | Hajjiabad | Hajjiabad | Hajjiabad-e Jadid | Hajjiabad-e Yarahmadi | Halak Dar Khadarham | Halakadar | Halkan | Halush | Hamvar-e Kulivand | Hamyaneh | Hamzeh Ali | Hapelaneh | Har Kuh | Hareh Bagh-e Khayyat | Harrafteh | Harshir-e Imani | Hasan Bagi-ye Rika | Hasan Beyg Mordeh | Hasanabad Bey Baba | Hasanabad Dermeni | Hasanabad | Hasanabad | Hasanabad | Hasanabad | Hasanabad | Hasanabad-e Gilavand | Hasanabad-e Sanjabi | Hashem Beg | Hashemabad | Hashvid | Hashvid | Hastak | Hatamabad | Hatamabad | Haveh | Havilan | Hayat ol Gheyb | Hayyeh | Hemmatabad | Hemmatabad | Hendi | Hendileh | Heraskah | Heshmatabad | Heshmatabad | Heydar Kar | Heydarabad | Heydarabad | Heydarabad | Heydarabad | Heydarabad | Heydarabad-e Chenareh | Heydarabad-e Marali | Heydarabad-e Saki | Heydarali | Heydarik | Heydarkhani | Heygeh-e Kaliab | Hezar Jerib | Hezar Khani | Hezar Mani | Hirab | Homa | Hondor | Horin Khalifeh | Horrabad-e Olya | Horrabad-e Sofla | Hoseyn Aliabad | Hoseyn Talai | Hoseynabad Shahivand | Hoseynabad | Hoseynabad | Hoseynabad | Hoseynabad | Hoseynabad | Hoseynabad | Hoseynabad | Hoseynabad-e Amiri | Hoseynabad-e Hendi Olya | Hoseynabad-e Khayyat | Hoseynabad-e Olya | Hoseynkhan | Hoseyvand | Hudar | Huki | Hulandasht | Hush

=== I ===
Ilard | Imanabad | Imanabad-e Sofla | Iran Shahi | Iranshah | Irman | Irveh | Istgah-e Bisheh | Istgah-e Keshvar | Istgah-e Tang-e Haft | Istgah-e-Cham Sanger | Ivaj | Ivandeh

=== J ===
Jadow Ab | Jafarabad | Jafarabad | Jafarabad | Jafarabad | Jafarabad | Jafarabad | Jafarabad-e Olya | Jafarabad-e Olya | Jafarabad-e Sofla | Jafarbagi-ye Olya | Jafarbagi-ye Sofla | Jafarkhan | Jafarkhan-e Zeytun | Jagirabad | Jahan Khvosh | Jahanabad | Jahanabad | Jahanabad | Jahanabad | Jahanabad | Jahangir | Jahangirabad | Jai Hatam | Jaleh | Jaleh | Jamshidabad | Jamshidabad | Jamshidabad | Jamshidabad-e Heydar | Jamshidabad-e Mirza | Janbolaq | Jarusan | Jashinvand | Javadabad | Javadabad | Javanabad | Jelogir | Jirgah | Jolgeh-ye Khalaj-e Olya | Jolgeh-ye Khalaj-e Sofla | Jorjor | Jowkar | Jowz | Judel Del | Jujeh Heydar | Jula Kamar | Junu | Jushan | Juzir

=== K ===
Kabud Ban | Kabudeh-ye Abu ol Vafai | Kabudeh-ye Hasanabad | Kabudlar | Kabutarlan | Kachalvand | Kaduney-e Sofla | Kaduney-e Vosta | Kafraj | Kafshgiran | Kagelestan | Kagelestan-e Bar Aftab | Kagheh | Kahriz Gizhian | Kahriz | Kahriz | Kahriz | Kahriz | Kahriz-e Jadid | Kahriz-e Sefid | Kahriz-e Sorkh | Kahriz-e Varvasht | Kahzadvand | Kakareza-ye Amid Ali | Kakareza-ye Olya | Kakareza-ye Sofla | Kakareza-ye Vosta | Kakavand | Kal Ab Ti | Kal Gah | Kal Gavrah | Kalak Bisheh-ye Asad | Kalak Bisheh-ye Qahramani | Kalak Bisheh-ye Sadiq | Kalak | Kalali | Kalan | Kalanganeh | Kalarcheh Shureh | Kalash Garan | Kalat | Kalateh Absardeh | Kaleh Ban | Kaleh Ban 1 | Kaleh Jub | Kaleh Kaleh Olya | Kalkaleh | Kalleh Ju | Kalleh Jub | Kalleh Jub-e Hajj Ali | Kalleh | Kamalvand-e Gholam Ali | Kamalvand-e Iman Ali | Kamalvand-e Mohammad Hoseyn Parvaneh | Kamandan | Kamaneh | Kamaneh-ye Mirzabeygi | Kamar Baleh | Kamar Gap | Kamar Siah | Kamareh | Kamareh-ye Bala | Kamareh-ye Hashem Beg | Kamareh-ye Heshmatabad | Kamareh-ye Mishnan | Kamari | Kamcheh Kola | Kamian-e Bala | Kamir Malmir | Kan Khan-e Masumeh | Kan Khan-e Yaqub | Kan Sorkh | Kanak Serakh Darab Pir | Kangar Zard | Kanuleh-ye Pain | Kapar Judaki | Kapargah | Kapargah-e Alireza | Kapargah-e Aqa Hoseyn | Kar Nowkar | Kara | Karam Alahi | Karamabad Haq Nader | Karamabad | Karamabad | Karamabad | Karamabad | Karamalahi | Karamjanabad | Karbustan | Karehgah-ye Pain | Kareh-ye Mian Rud-e Zaruni | Karfaleh | Karfaleh-ye Lavan | Karfeleh-ye Imanabad | Karganeh | Kargaz | Karim | Karimabad | Karimabad Nurali | Karimabad Qadim | Karimabad | Karimabad | Karimvand | Karkan-e Olya | Karkar | Karkhaneh Sefid Kan | Karkhaneh-ye Hakim | Karkikhan | Kartabad | Kartilan | Karvaneh | Karvansara-ye Olya | Karvansara-ye Sofla | Kas Ali Mirzayi | Kashkak | Kasian-e Rostam Khani | Katal | Katkan | Kaveh Kali | Kaveh-ye Olya | Kaveh-ye Olya | Kaveh-ye Sofla | Kaveh-ye Vosta | Kay Baraftab | Kazemabad | Kazemabad | Kazemabad | Kazemabad | Kazemabad | Kazemi | Kerchian | Keryeh Sheykh Ali Khodadad | Keryeh-ye Abdolah Shiravand | Keshavardeh-ye Sofla | Keshavarzeh-ye Olya | Kesmat | Key Kam Dar | Keydan | Keyvareh | Keznar | Khadarhem Zeytun | Khak Beh Tiyeh | Khakabad | Khaki Branazar | Khaki | Khaki-ye Olya | Khaki-ye Shekarabad | Khaki-ye Sofla | Khaki-ye Vosta | Khalaj Darreh | Khalifehabad | Khalil Akbar | Khalilabad | Khalilan-e Olya | Khalilan-e Sofla | Khan Amir | Khan Jan Khani | Khan Verdi | Khanabad | Khanabad | Khanabad | Khanabad | Khanegeh | Khaneh Chubi | Khaneh Sorkh | Khanqah | Khar Eshgaft | Khargalu | Khargush Khani | Kharzar | Khas Morad | Khasali | Khatereh | Khatunabad | Khayan | Kherreh Siah | Khers Dar | Khersdar Darreh Dimeh | Khersdar-e Kakamorad | Khersdar-e Olya | Khersdar-e Sofla | Khersian | Kheshtianak | Kheyrabad | Kheyrabad | Kheyrabad-e Olya | Kheyrabad-e Sofla | Kheyran Bareh | Khiaran | Khirdarar | Khoda Dadkosh-e Sofla | Khoda Vardi | Khomeh Olya | Khomeh Sofla | Khomestan | Khomsianeh | Khomsianeh-ye Musaabad | Khomsianeh-ye Pain | Khomsianeh-ye Rish Sefid | Khorramabad | Khorusan | Khoshaki | Khoshkeh Rud | Khosrow Khani | Khosrow Khani | Khosrowabad | Khosrowabad | Khosrowabad | Khvoabad | Khvorheh | Khvoshnam | Kian Baraftab | Kian-e Nesar | Kicheh | Kigeh Olya | Kileh | Kiru | Kish Galeh Bid | Kish Olya | Kivarz-e Olya | Kivarz-e Sofla | Kizan Darreh | Kodivar | Kolah Hil | Kolah Kaj | Kolang Sar | Kolbor | Kol-e Sorkh Yeydi | Koleh Jub-e Sofla | Koleh Ney | Koleh Ney | Kolehu | Kolivand | Konar Balut | Kondor | Kordabad-e Olya | Kordabad-e Sofla | Korkor | Kuamineh | Kuchakan | Kuchekeh Shiravand | Kugan Baraftab | Kugan Nasar | Kuhdasht | Kul Badam-e Nurmorad | Kul Badam-e Yavar | Kul Chap | Kul Marz Olya | Kul Marz Sofla | Kul Nabi Sahara | Kulabad | Kulageh | Kulband | Kuleh Nab | Kulu | Kumas | Kunani | Kunkareh | Kur Shurab-e Alishah | Kurabeh | Kurdasht-e Olya | Kureh Chi | Kushk | Kushk | Kushki | Kushki | Kushki-ye Olya | Kushki-ye Sofla | Kutuleh Hasan | Kutuleh-ye Aziz Khan | Kutuleh-ye Baba Karam |

=== L ===
Laban-e Olya | Laban-e Sofla | Lajam Gir | Lalabad | Lalari Do | Lalari Yek | Lalvand | Lam-e Darish | Lanjabad | Lareh Sabzi | Larkeh | Latif | Latifabad | Latvand-e Baraftab | Lazgireh | Leylan Cham | Liqenab | Liruk | Lit Bar-e Zivdar |

=== M ===
Madabeh | Magasan-e Olya | Mahdi Khan | Mahi | Mahi Lan | Mahki | Mahmudabad Shahab | Mahmudabad | Mahmudvand | Mahrokhi Kalleh Jub | Majeshti | Makineh Hakumti | Makineh Nasiri | Mal Gasheh | Malavi | Malek Ali | Malek Alus | Malek Mirzacham Dashti | Malekabad | Malekabad | Malekabad | Malekabad | Malekabad | Malekabad | Malekabad-e Somaq | Malekayad | Malia | Malicheh | Malimdul | Malmijan | Mamu | Mamulah | Mamulan | Maqsudabad | Marg Sar | Margad Sar | Marreh | Maru | Marvak | Marzian | Mashhadi Barag Jar | Mashhadi Hoseyn | Mashhadi Juzi | Masi Mordeh | Masudabad | Masumabad | Masur | Masur-e Abi | Mavedyn Vamhajryn | Mehdiabad | Mehr Alikhani | Mehrabad-e Tudehrud | Mehraban | Mehtar | Melaharbeyg | Meleh Chah Shureh | Meleh Kabud-e Olya | Meleh Kabud-e Sofla | Meleh Sorkheh | Meleh-ye Amiri | Meleh-ye Balut | Meleh-ye Posht-e Sar Takht | Meleh-ye Shabanan | Melhu Azim Khan | Mesgari | Meydan | Meydanak | Meydan-e Bozorg | Meykushkan | Mian Choqa | Mian Kharan | Mian Maleh Abbasabad | Mian Rudan | Mian Rud-e Zaruni | Mian Tagan | Mian Volan-e Olya | Mian Volan-e Sofla | Mian Volan-e Vosta | Miangaran | Miantang-e Olya | Miantang-e Sofla | Mileh Khan | Milmilak | Mina Parian | Mineh | Minu | Mir Ahmadi | Mir Ahmadi | Mirabad | Mirabad | Mirali | Mirandeh | Mireh va Ahmad | Mirmalegeh Olya | Mirzaabad | Mirzaabad-e Khayyat | Mirzai-ye Ahangari | Mirzajan | Misheh Kisheh | Mishkar | Misown | Mivaleh Sofla | Mobarakabad | Modabad | Moghanak-e Olya | Moghanak-e Sofla | Mohammad Ali Kushki | Mohammad Aliabad | Mohammad Kal | Mohammad Karim Kushki | Mohammad Mirzai | Mohammad Shahabad | Mohammad Tip | Mohammad Zaki Kushki | Mohammadabad | Mohammadabad | Mohammadabad | Mohammadabad | Mohammadabad-e Garavand | Mohammadhasanvand | Mohammadjan-e Falak ol Din | Mohreh Nar Mohammad | Mohuk Yek | Mokhtarabad | Mokhtavai | Molla Qorbani | Molla Taleb | Momenabad | Morad Ali | Morad Jan | Morad Khan | Moradabad Nurali | Moradabad | Moradabad | Moradabad | Moradabad | Moradabad | Moradabad | Moradabad-e Gol Gol | Moradabad-e Mirakhur | Moradabad-e Pirdusti | Mordeh Shureh-ye Posht Tang | Morgh Mohsen-e Tai | Moridabad | Morshedabad | Mosaddeqabad | Moshkak | Movelah | Mowmenabad | Mowmenabad | Muareh | Mucherella | Mulish | Munak | Murani | Murat | Muraz-e Musa | Mus | Musa Vand | Musaabad | Musaabad-e Olya | Musaabad-e Sofla | Mushleh

=== N ===
Nabiabad | Nabivand | Najaf Qoli | Najafabad | Najafabad | Nam Kul | Namaklan-e Olya | Namaklan-e Sofla | Namdar | Namju | Naqareh-ye Naveh Kesh | Naqiabad-e Nadar | Nargeseh | Nariman | Nasarkhasiabad | Naser ol Din | Naservand | Naservand | Naservand-e Rahimi | Nasirabad | Nasirabad | Nasrabad | Naveh Kesh | Nay Angiz | Nazar Khan | Nazarabad | Nazarabad | Nel Khvast-e Olya | Nematabad | Ni Badar | Niazabad | Nileh Safid | Nileh | Nokhvodkar Dermeni | Nosratabad | Nosratabad | Nosratabad-e Olya | Nosratabad-e Sofla | Nosrati-ye Sar Anbar | Now Deh | Nowmaleh | Nowmaleh-ye Sofla | Nowruzabad | Nowruzabad | Nur Alivand Kar | Nur Mohammadi Zamaneh | Nurabad | Nurabad-e Cheshmeh Barqi | Nurabad-e Nadar | Nushabad | Nuzi Shahsavarvand

=== O ===
Oshtorinan | Owlad-e Darbandkabud | Owlad-e Naqiabad

=== P ===
Pa Alam | Pa Pulak | Pa Qaleh | Pa Takht-e Do | Pa Takht-e Seh | Pa Takht-e Yek | Pachal | Padarvand-e Olya | Padarvand-e Sofla | Padarvand-e Vosta | Pahalat | Pahlavan Kal | Pain Ab-e Olya | Pain Ab-e Sofla Sharqi | Pakabud | Pakhimeh Gah | Panbeh Kar | Panbeh Kar | Pandaki | Panesar-e Tashkan | Panj Zowj | Pankabad | Papadindar-e Olya | Papadindar-e Sofla | Papi Ahmad | Papi Khaldar-e Olya | Papi Khaldar-e Sofla | Papiabad Kalivand | Papol-e Madian Rud | Par Vazin | Parah Puneh | Paran Parviz | Parcheh Balut | Parcheh Sorkheh | Parchel | Pareh Aleh | Parek | Paresk | Pari Mordeh-ye Bala | Pariab-e Seyd-e Mohammad | Parian-e Allah Morad | Partapil | Pas Fidaneh | Pasgolam | Pasham | Pasil | Pa-ye Astan | Pay-e Borj | Paykabud | Paytaf | Pazardalu | Pel Hava | Peleh-ye Baba Hoseyn | Pelkan-e Olya | Pelkan-e Sofla | Perchestan | Peyvast | Pez-e Olya | Pez-e Sofla | Pez-e Vosta | Pilehgah | Pineh Kuh | Pir Dezgah | Pir Emam | Pir Hayati | Pir Mahi | Pir Mohammad Baba Hoseyn | Pir Mohammad Shah | Pir Morad | Pir Samadin | Pir Sharif | Pirabad | Pireh Bar | Piri Reza | Pirijed | Pirjad-e Pain | Pirjed | Pirkeh-ye Olya | Pirkeh-ye Sofla | Pol Eshkeneh | Pol Haru | Pol Mamun | Polchi | Pol-e Dokhtar | Pol-e Shurab | Posht Ju | Posht Koreh | Posht Kyu Vareh Zard | Posht Kyubadam | Posht Meleh | Posht Meleh | Posht Qaleh | Posht Tang-e Chameshk | Posht Tang-e Dar Vazneh | Posht Tang-e Dustali | Posht Tang-e Khushab | Posht Tang-e Kordali | Posht Tang-e Mishvand | Posht Tang-e Parian | Posht Tang-e Sofla Rahim Khan | Posht Tang-e Sofla Seyyed Reza | Posht Tappeh | Posht-e Meleh Sangar | Posht-e Tang-e Chenar | Posht-e Tang-e Firuzabad | Posht-e Tang-e Gol Gol | Posht-e Zarrin Choqa | Poshteh Jazayeri | Poshteh-ye Olya | Poshteh-ye Sari | Poshteh-ye Sofla | Push Kashan

=== Q ===
Qabr-e Mohammad | Qabr-e Musa | Qabr-e Ramezan | Qaderabad | Qadian | Qaed Taher | Qala Zanjir | Qalandar | Qalandar | Qalebi-ye Olya | Qalebi-ye Sofla | Qaleh Ali Morad Khan | Qaleh Bardi | Qaleh Joghd | Qaleh Kazem | Qaleh Nar | Qaleh Nasir | Qaleh Now | Qaleh Now-ye Hakim | Qaleh Now-ye Showkati | Qaleh Ochaq | Qaleh Sangi | Qaleh Shekar | Qaleh-ye Abd ol Reza | Qaleh-ye Absardeh | Qaleh-ye Ali | Qaleh-ye Baha ol Din | Qaleh-ye Bahador | Qaleh-ye Dustan | Qaleh-ye Hadi Chakmeh Siah | Qaleh-ye Hajji Rahmatollah | Qaleh-ye Hatam | Qaleh-ye Jahan Bakhsh | Qaleh-ye Jahangir | Qaleh-ye Kamohammad Reza | Qaleh-ye Kasian | Qaleh-ye Khalileh | Qaleh-ye Khanjan | Qaleh-ye Mansur | Qaleh-ye Mir Ali | Qaleh-ye Mirza Ali | Qaleh-ye Mishvand | Qaleh-ye Mohammad Zia | Qaleh-ye Nashin Shahi | Qaleh-ye Naveh Kesh | Qaleh-ye Qanbar | Qaleh-ye Rahim | Qaleh-ye Rostam | Qaleh-ye Samur Khan | Qaleh-ye Shamsi | Qaleh-ye Sheykh | Qanatabad | Qanat-e Kasian | Qanbar Ali-ye Olya | Qapanvari | Qarah Din | Qarah Khan | Qarah Malek | Qarah Su | Qasem Beygi | Qasemabad | Qasemabad | Qasemabad-e Cheshmeh Barqi | Qasemali-ye Bar Aftab | Qataat | Qazi Khani | Qaziabad | Qaziabad | Qebleh | Qeshlaq | Qeshlaq-e Ganjeh | Qeshlaq-e Posht Qala | Qeshlaq-e Tahsaran | Qetel Yum | Qisur | Qisurabad | Qolian | Qomish | Qoroq

=== R ===
Rabiabad | Radez | Rah Band-e Olya | Rah Band-e Sofla | Rahim Hatami-ye Do | Rahim Hatami-ye Yek | Rahimabad Du | Rahimabad Seh | Rahimabad | Rahimabad | Rahimabad-e Yek | Rahmanabad-e Zagheh-ye Lalvand | Rahmatabad | Rahmatabad | Raisvand | Rajabad | Raken-e Olya | Raken-e Sofla | Ramavand Piruz Ali | Ramavandi-ye Sofla | Ramazanabad | Rangin Ban | Rangin Ban | Rangrazan-e Olya | Rangrazan-e Sofla | Rangrazan-e Vosta | Rashidabad | Rashidi | Rashnudeh | Razan | Raziabad | Razvar | Redeveh | Reza Khan | Rezaabad | Rezaabad | Rezaabad | Rezaabad | Rezaabad | Rezaabad | Rezaabad-e Mian Volan | Rezaabad-e Reza Veys | Rezayi | Rezgah | Ridar | Rig Sefid | Rig Sefid | Rig-e Sefid | Rikhan | Rikhan-e Do | Rikhan-e Seh | Rikhan-e Yek | Rikhteh Kuh | Rimaleh | Rish Vand | Robat-e Namaki | Roknabad | Rostam Khan Judaki | Rostamabad Jamshidi | Rostamabad | Ruband-e Jolgeh-ye Khalaj | Rudbar Hoseyn Beyg | Rumeshteh | Rumeshteh Mowmenabad | Rumiani | Ruz Gireh | Ruzmianki

=== S ===
Sabandan | Sabur | Sabzeh Khani | Sabzevar | Sadeqabad | Safarabad | Safarabad | Safarabad | Sal Hamid | Salahvarzi | Salanjeh Zaruni | Salar Dul | Salari | Saleh Safir | Salehabad Amid Ali | Salehabad | Salianeh | Salianeh | Sali-ye Bozorg | Sali-ye Kuchek | Samaqaha | Sandarkan | Sang Kor | Sang Tarashan | Sangar | Sang-e Sefid | Sang-e Sefid | Sang-e Sefid | Sanj Dan | Sanj | Sankarik | Sar Bisheh | Sar Chaqa | Sar Dasht | Sar Gandab-e Sofla | Sar Kamareh | Sar Kyu | Sar Marang | Sar Margh-e Olya | Sar Margh-e Sofla | Sar Poleh-ye Baba Hoseyn | Sar Qabrestan-e Olya Shamal | Sar Qabrestan-e Sofla Shamal | Sar Qaleh Sofla | Sar Qaleh | Sar Qaleh | Sar Qaleh | Sar Rag | Sar Takht-e Qadam Kheyr | Sar Tang Mahi | Sar Tang-e Bid Gijeh | Sar Tang-e Leyshan | Sar Tappeh | Sar Tappeh | Sar Taq | Sar Zanguleh | Sarab Chenar-e Olya | Sarab Chenar-e Sofla | Sarab Ghazanfar | Sarab Hammam | Sarab Mahmudvand | Sarab Pardeh | Sarab Sorkheh Ahmadabad | Sarab Sorkheh Sadeqabad | Sarabad Bar Aftab | Sarab-e Abd ol Ali | Sarab-e Ahmadvand | Sarab-e Alinaqi | Sarab-e Bardin | Sarab-e Cheggeh | Sarab-e Darab | Sarab-e Darai | Sarab-e Dowreh | Sarab-e Elyas | Sarab-e Ganj Ali | Sarab-e Ganj Ali | Sarab-e Honam | Sarab-e Humian | Sarab-e Jahangir | Sarab-e Jaldan | Sarab-e Key Mirzavand Du | Sarab-e Key Mirzavandbak | Sarab-e Kian | Sarab-e Maleki | Sarab-e Molla Qorbani | Sarab-e Panbeh | Sarab-e Papi | Sarab-e Pardeh Chahi | Sarab-e Pirdusti | Sarab-e Rajab | Sarab-e Robat | Sarab-e Rofteh Khan | Sarab-e Sandal | Sarab-e Saqqa | Sarab-e Seyah Push | Sarab-e Seyyed Ali | Sarab-e Shahbaz | Sarab-e Sheykh Ali | Sarab-e Sheykh Musa | Sarab-e Suri | Sarab-e Talkh | Sarab-e Yas | Sarab-e Zarem | Sarabisheh | Saramad | Saranbar-e Kalantari | Saranjeh-e Qolayi | Sarastan | Sarastaneh | Saravand | Sarchak-e Dadabad | Sarcheshmeh Zaruni | Sarcheshmeh-ye Kamalvand | Sard | Sardarabad | Sardarabad | Sarenjeh-ye Zivdar | Sarfarash | Sargerefteh-ye Sofla | Sargrefteh | Sarguizheh | Sargul-e Namak | Sarhalat | Sari Kuchakeh | Sari Kuh Olya | Sari Miri | Sarkaneh | Sarkaneh Abbasabad | Sarlak | Sarmar | Sarnaveh Changizi | Sartang-e Barzeh | Sarur | Sarzaman | Sarzan | Sefid Ab | Sefid Darkhat | Sefid Dasht | Sefid Khani Ahmedvand | Sefid Khani | Sefid Khani | Sefid Khani-ye Jadid | Sefid Khani-ye Kuchek | Sefid Qoleh Zaruni | Seh Asiab | Seh Gor | Seh Korreh | Seh Ran Bala | Seh Ran Pain | Seh Suk | Sepiddasht | Sepideh-ye Gol Gol | Sey Gar Azim Khan | Seyavel | Seyd Abbas | Seyd-e Nar | Seyfabad | Seyfabad | Seykavand-e Chavari | Seyl Cheshmeh-ye Olya | Seyl Cheshmeh-ye Sofla | Seyl Gorgi | Seyl Kabud | Seyl Karim | Seyl Mish-e Olya | Seyl Mish-e Sofla | Seyl Molla Qorbani | Seyl Nazar | Seyl Reza | Seyl-e Habil | Seyyed Abbas | Seyyed Ahmad Shah | Seyyed Ali | Seyyed Ali | Seyyed Heshmat | Seyyed Hoseyn Kalah Fatah Ali | Seyyed Hoseyn Kushki | Seyyed Karim-e Kushki | Seyyed Ziba Mohammad | Seyyedabad | Seyyedhasan | Shab Mah | Shaban Kosh | Shaban | Shabandar | Shabi Khun Meleh Sorkheh | Shah Makan | Shah Makan-e Sefer | Shah Nazar-e Mirian | Shah Pahneh | Shah Parvarmordeh | Shah Qoli | Shah Qoliabad | Shah Reza | Shah Rezaabad | Shah Valeh | Shah Viran-e Bala | Shah Viran-e Pain | Shahabad | Shahanshah | Shahbaz Bek | Shah-e Bozorg | Shahivand Ali Morad | Shahnabad | Shahpurabad | Shahpurabad | Shahrak Emam | Shahrak Emam Khomeyni | Shahrak-e Almahdi | Shahrak-e Baba Abbas | Shahrak-e Bornabad | Shahrak-e Emam Khomeyni | Shahrak-e Shahid Moḩammad-e Borujerdi | Shahriar | Shahrud | Shahvali | Shakargaravand | Shams ol Din | Shamsabad | Sharaf Bag | Sharafabad-e Bala | Sharafabad-e Pain | Sharifabad | Sharvand | Shater | Shayileh | Shekarabad | Shekarabad | Shekarabad | Shelal-e Ali | Shengan | Shesh Narm | Sheyfan Sofla | Sheykh Gol | Sheykh Heydar | Sheykh Miri-ye Kalhor | Sheykh Miri-ye Sadat | Sheykh Morad | Sheykhabad Sheykheh | Sheykhabad | Sheykhabad | Sheykhabad-e Zangivand | Sheykhali | Sheykhan-e Davud Khuni | Sheyun | Shineh-ye Olya | Shineh-ye Sofla | Shir Khani | Shiran Bisheh | Shiravand Gandabeh | Shiravand Naveh | Shiravand | Shiravand | Shirvan | Shisheh | Shojaabad | Shor Shoreh | Shotor Khoft | Shotor Mel | Shotor Mel-e Olya-ye Rahmat | Shulehabad-e Olya | Shulehabad-e Sofla | Shur Shureh | Shurabad | Shurab-e Mahmudvand | Shurab-e Najm-e Soheyli | Shurab-e Olya | Shurabeh-ye Karim Khan | Shurabeh-ye Sofla Do | Shurabeh-ye Sofla Yek | Shurabeh-ye Vosta | Shurabeh-ye Vosta Shahmorad | Shurcheh | Siah Chal | Siah Cham | Siah Cheshmeh | Siah Dul-e Olya | Siah Gel | Siah Gel-e Shah Abbas | Siah Kalleh | Siah Kamareh Zali | Siah Pelah-ye Ommid Olya | Siavashabad | Silav | Sinabad | Sirak | Sirdar-e Bala | Sirdar-e Pain | Sireh-ye Olya | Sireh-ye Sofla | Sirinjeh | Sirkaneh | Sirom | Sirom-e Olya | Sirom-e Sofla | Siruleh Zarun | Sirzar | Siveleh | Siyahleya | Sizan | Sohbatabad | Soheyl Beygi | Sohrababad | Sokaneh | Soranjeh | Soranjeh | Soranjeh | Sorkh Dom-e Khushnamvand | Sorkh Dom-e Laki | Sorkh Mal Nazanin | Sorkhanjub-e Olya | Sorkhanjub-e Sofla | Sorkheh Deh-e Olya | Sorkheh Deh-e Sofla | Sorkheh Lizeh | Sorkheh Lizheh Karim Ali | Sorkvareh Owlad Qobad | Sormeh | Sowl Marjan | Sukeh | Suki-ye Olya | Sur | Suran | Suyi | Suzar

=== T ===
Tabarijan | Taftafineh Shams Ali | Taheriabad | Taj Amir | Tajareh Sadat | Tajareh Sar Ab-e Sadat | Tajareh-ye Galehdar | Taju-ye Sofla | Taju-ye Vosta | Takaneh | Takdarkhat | Takht Ab | Takht Ab-e Gerdkaneh | Takiyeh Owlad Qobad | Talekstan | Taleqan | Taleqan-ye Do | Taleqan-ye Yek | Tall Jem | Tall-e Amanollah | Tall-e Mohammad Yusof | Tall-e Morad Khani | Tall-e Nemat | Tall-e Salar | Taluri-ye Olya | Taluri-ye Sofla | Tang Qaleh | Tang Taf | Tang-e Darab-e Rika | Tang-e Goraz | Tang-e Kabud | Tang-e Khushab | Tang-e Loreh | Tang-e Mohammad Haji | Tang-e Musa | Tang-e Namak | Tang-e Pari Olya | Tang-e Sistan | Tang-i-Panj | Tanjur | Tanur Dar | Tappeh Dar | Tappeh Goji | Tappeh Mowla | Tappeh Shir Khan | Taq Rezaleh-ye Mohammad Aqa | Taq-e Abbasali | Taq-e Pol | Taqiabad | Taqiabad | Taqiabad-e Kan Kot | Tarhani-ye Sofla | Tarik Aviz | Tarikeh-ye Rangrazan | Tarom | Tarveh Maratzi | Tashkan-e Sadat | Tavbor | Tayab | Tazan | Tazarah | Tazeh Ran | Tazehabad Bahram | Tazehabad Golestaneh | Tazehabad | Tazehabad | Tazehabad | Tehmasabi | Telih | Temeliyeh | Tetrabad | Tey | Teymur Golam Bahri | Teymur Suri-ye Olya | Teymur Suri-ye Sofla | Teymurabad | Teymurabad | Tian | Tian | Tidar | Tindar | Tir Bazar | Tiran | Tirnan | Titkan | Tombak | Tork Amir | Torshab | Tovah Khoshkeh | Towhid Suri | Tudar | Tudar-e Shah Karami | Tudeh Zan | Tuh Tangeh | Tulabi Baraftab | Tuna | Tunab | Tushkeh | Tut | Tutdar | Tut-e Chehreh | Tut-e Rudab |

=== U ===
Ud-e Molla

=== V ===
Vajihabad | Valad Kosh | Valanjerd | Valashan | Valiabad Khosrow Khani | Valiabad | Valiabad-e Shiri | Valian | Valieasr | Vali-ye Asr | Vanab | Vanai | Vanayi-ye Olya | Vanayi-ye Sofla | Vanu | Varak | Varedeh | Vareh Zard | Vareh Zardi | Vareh Zardi | Varmeleh | Varnamad | Varnameh | Varpol | Varvandi | Varvandi-ye Kuchak | Vashian-e Cheshmeh Shirin | Vashian-e Karim Hoseyn | Vashian-e Nasir Tappeh | Vashian-e Nosrati | Vashian-e Takht Shir | Vazirabad | Veysian | Vezmedar |

=== Y ===
Yadegar | Yar Ali | Yar Hoseynabad | Yarabad Mirbeyg | Yarabad | Yarali-ye Olya | Yarali-ye Sofla | Yaramushi | Yar-e Hoseyn | Yariabad | Yarvaliabad | Yazdgerd | Yehrezegi | Yek Borji | Yek Dang | Yengeh Hoseyn | Yusefabad Cham Chal | Yusefabad | Yusefabad | Yusefabad-e Abdolmeni

=== Z ===
Zafarabad | Zafarabad | Zagheh | Zagheh | Zahedshir | Zahrakar | Zahrakar-e Nesardeleh | Zakhli Tireh | Zaliab | Zaliab | Zaliabad | Zaliabad Yarnazir | Zamgah Zich | Zanganeh Ganjeh | Zangi Bon | Zanguldar | Zardabad | Zardalu Sofla | Zardeh Savar | Zardeh Savar | Zardeh Savar | Zarem | Zargaran | Zargaran-e Olya | Zargaran-e Sofla | Zarnan | Zarrin Choqa Shahid Jabari | Zarrin Choqa-ye Olya | Zarrin Choqa-ye Sofla | Zarrin Ju | Zarrin Jub | Zarrin Khani | Zarrinabad | Zarrin-e Chaqa | Zaruni Hamat Beyg | Zavarijan | Zazam | Zeq | Zereshgeh | Zeynali | Zhan | Zherizhban | Zhiryan | Ziba | Zich | Zir Anbar-e Zivdar | Zir Kamareh | Zir Tang | Zir Tang-e Khayyat | Zir Taq Doab | Zircheshmeh | Zirkul | Zirrah Amirqoli | Zirtang-e Chameshk | Ziveh Dar | Zolivar | Zuleh | Zuran Tal-e Zivdar | Zuran Tall | Zurancham | Zurandul |
