= Mirmalegeh Olya =

Mirmalegeh Olya ميرمالگه عليا
- Village
- Location within Iran
- Coordinates: 34°09′27″N 47°39′36″E
- Country: Iran
- Province: Lorestan
- County: Delfan
- Bakhsh: Kakavand
- Rural District: Kakavand-e Sharqi

Population (2006)
  - Total: 32
- Time zone: UTC+3:30 (IRST)
  - Summer (DST): UTC+4:30 (IRDT)

Mirmalegeh Olya (Persian: ميرمالگه عليا, also Romanized as Mīrmālegeh ʿOlyā; also known as Mīrmālegeh) is a village in Kakavand-e Sharqi Rural District, Kakavand District, Delfan County, Lorestan Province, Iran. At the 2006 census, its population was 32, in 7 families.
