= Zanguldar =

Zanguldar زنگولدر
- Village
- Location within Iran
- Coordinates: 33°15′39″N 48°46′02″E
- Country: Iran
- Province: Lorestan
- County: Khorramabad
- Bakhsh: Papi
- Rural District: Gerit

Population (2006)
  - Total: 27
- Time zone: UTC+3:30 (IRST)
  - Summer (DST): UTC+4:30 (IRDT)

Zanguldar (Persian: زنگولدر, also Romanized as Zangūldar and Zangūl Dar; also known as Zangūlvār) is a village in Gerit Rural District, Papi District, Khorramabad County, Lorestan Province, Iran. At the 2006 census, its population was 27, in 4 families.
