= Molla Qorbani =

Molla Qorbani ملاقرباني
- Village
- Location within Iran
- Coordinates: 33°36′12″N 48°32′46″E
- Country: Iran
- Province: Lorestan
- County: Khorramabad
- Bakhsh: Bayravand
- Rural District: Beyranvand-e Jonubi

Population (2006)
  - Total: 52
- Time zone: UTC+3:30 (IRST)
  - Summer (DST): UTC+4:30 (IRDT)

Molla Qorbani (Persian: ملاقرباني, also Romanized as Mollā Qorbānī; also known as Sarāb-e Mollā Qorbānī and Seyl Mollā Qorbānī) is a village in Beyranvand-e Jonubi Rural District, Bayravand District, Khorramabad County, Lorestan Province, Iran. At the 2006 census, its population was 52, in 12 families.
