= Kurabeh =

Kurabeh كورابه
- village
- Location within Iran
- Coordinates: 33°20′00″N 48°30′00″E
- Country: Iran
- Province: Lorestan
- County: Khorramabad
- Bakhsh: Central
- Rural District: Kakasharaf

Population (2006)
  - Total: 25
- Time zone: UTC+3:30 (IRST)
  - Summer (DST): UTC+4:30 (IRDT)

Kurabeh (Persian: كورابه, also Romanized as Kūrābeh) is a village in Kakasharaf Rural District, in the Central District of Khorramabad County, Lorestan Province, Iran. At the 2006 census, its population was 25, in 5 families.
