= Gadpuk =

Gadpuk گدپوك
- Village
- Location within Iran
- Coordinates: 33°10′31″N 48°44′16″E
- Country: Iran
- Province: Lorestan
- County: Khorramabad
- Bakhsh: Papi
- Rural District: Chamsangar

Population (2006)
  - Total: 24
- Time zone: UTC+3:30 (IRST)
  - Summer (DST): UTC+4:30 (IRDT)

Gadpuk (Persian: گدپوك, also Romanized as Gadpūk; also known as Gowdeh-ye Yūk) is a village in Chamsangar Rural District, Papi District, Khorramabad County, Lorestan Province, Iran. At the 2006 census, its population was 24, in 4 families.
