= Tushkeh =

Tushkeh توئيشكه
- Village
- Location within Iran
- Coordinates: 33°46′52″N 48°34′55″E
- Country: Iran
- Province: Lorestan
- County: Khorramabad
- Bakhsh: Bayravand
- Rural District: Beyranvand-e Shomali

Population (2006)
  - Total: 60
- Time zone: UTC+3:30 (IRST)
  - Summer (DST): UTC+4:30 (IRDT)

Tushkeh (Persian: توئيشكه, also Romanized as Tūshkeh and Tūshgeh) is a village in Beyranvand-e Shomali Rural District, Bayravand District, Khorramabad County, Lorestan Province, Iran. At the 2006 census, its population was 60, in 12 families.
