= Nowmaleh-ye Sofla =

Nowmaleh-ye Sofla نوماله سفلي
- Village
- Location within Iran
- Coordinates: 33°30′43″N 48°47′07″E
- Country: Iran
- Province: Lorestan
- County: Khorramabad
- Bakhsh: Zagheh
- Rural District: Qaedrahmat

Population (2006)
  - Total: 39
- Time zone: UTC+3:30 (IRST)
  - Summer (DST): UTC+4:30 (IRDT)

Nowmaleh-ye Sofla (Persian: نوماله سفلي, also Romanized as Nowmāleh-ye Soflá; also known as Nīm Allāh, Noh Māleh, and Now Māleh) is a village in Qaedrahmat Rural District, Zagheh District, Khorramabad County, Lorestan Province, Iran. At the 2006 census, its population was 39, in 7 families.
