= Cham-e Aqamordeh =

Cham-e Aqamordeh چم اقامرده
- Village
- Location within Iran
- Coordinates: 33°08′27″N 48°49′53″E
- Country: Iran
- Province: Lorestan
- County: Khorramabad
- Bakhsh: Papi
- Rural District: Chamsangar

Population (2006)
  - Total: 30
- Time zone: UTC+3:30 (IRST)
  - Summer (DST): UTC+4:30 (IRDT)

Cham-e Aqamordeh (Persian: چم اقامرده, also Romanized as Cham-e Āqāmordeh and Cham Āqā Mordeh) is a village in Chamsangar Rural District, Papi District, Khorramabad County, Lorestan Province, Iran. At the 2006 census, its population was 30, in 5 families.
