= Cheshmeh-ye Hajji Mohammad =

Cheshmeh-ye Hajji Mohammad چشمه حاجي محمد
- Village
- Location within Iran
- Coordinates: 34°14′26″N 47°46′39″E
- Country: Iran
- Province: Lorestan
- County: Delfan
- Bakhsh: Kakavand
- Rural District: Kakavand-e Sharqi

Population (2006)
  - Total: 87
- Time zone: UTC+3:30 (IRST)
  - Summer (DST): UTC+4:30 (IRDT)

Cheshmeh-ye Hajji Mohammad (Persian: چشمه حاجي محمد, also Romanized as Cheshmeh-ye Ḩājjī Moḩammad and Cheshmeh-ye Ḩājj Moḩammad) is a village in Kakavand-e Sharqi Rural District, Kakavand District, Delfan County, Lorestan Province, Iran. At the 2006 census, its population was 87, in 21 families.
