= Misheh Kisheh =

Village in Lorestan Province, Iran

Misheh Kisheh میشه کشه
- Village
- Country: Iran
- Province: Lorestan
- County: Delfan
- Bakhsh: Kakavand
- Rural District: Kakavand-e Gharbi

Population (2006)
  - Total: 43
- Time zone: UTC+3:30 (IRST)
  - Summer (DST): UTC+4:30 (IRDT)

Misheh Kisheh (Persian: میشه کشه, also Romanized as Mīsheh Kisheh) is a village in Kakavand-e Gharbi Rural District, Kakavand District, Delfan County, Lorestan Province, Iran. At the 2006 census, its population was 43, in five families.

The literal translation of Misheh Kisheh is "Gets Closer".

== Geography ==
Misheh Kisheh is located in western Iran, southwest of the capital, Tehran, in the Zagros Mountains.
