= Zahedshir =

Zahedshir زاهدشير
- Village
- Location within Iran
- Coordinates: 33°28′20″N 48°27′03″E
- Country: Iran
- Province: Lorestan
- County: Khorramabad
- Bakhsh: Central
- Rural District: Dehpir

Population (2006)
  - Total: 339
- Time zone: UTC+3:30 (IRST)
  - Summer (DST): UTC+4:30 (IRDT)

Zahedshir (Persian: زاهدشير, also Romanized as Zāhedshīr and Zāhed Shīr; also known as Deh-e Zāhed, Deh Zāhid, and Zāhedshīn) is a village in Dehpir Rural District, in the Central District of Khorramabad County, Lorestan Province, Iran. At the 2006 census, its population was 339, in 79 families.
