= Bahram Kosh-e Mirza =

Bahram Kosh-e Mirza بهرام كش ميرزا
- Village
- Location within Iran
- Coordinates: 33°18′44″N 48°24′57″E
- Country: Iran
- Province: Lorestan
- County: Khorramabad
- Bakhsh: Central
- Rural District: Koregah-e Sharqi

Population (2006)
  - Total: 30
- Time zone: UTC+3:30 (IRST)
  - Summer (DST): UTC+4:30 (IRDT)

Bahram Kosh-e Mirza (Persian: بهرام كش ميرزا, also Romanized as Bahrām Kosh-e Mīrzā and Bahrām Kosh Mīrzā; also known as Bahrām Kosh) is a village in Koregah-e Sharqi Rural District, in the Central District of Khorramabad County, Lorestan Province, Iran. At the 2006 census, its population was 30, in 5 families.
