= Kalleh Ju =

Kalleh Ju كله جو
- Village
- Location within Iran
- Coordinates: 33°37′21″N 48°17′17″E
- Country: Iran
- Province: Lorestan
- County: Khorramabad
- Bakhsh: Central
- Rural District: Robat

Population (2006)
  - Total: 125
- Time zone: UTC+3:30 (IRST)
  - Summer (DST): UTC+4:30 (IRDT)

Kalleh Ju (Persian: كله جو, also Romanized as Kalleh Jū) is a village in Robat Rural District, in the Central District of Khorramabad County, Lorestan Province, Iran. At the 2006 census, its population was 125, in 28 families.
