= Bid Gijeh =

Bid Gijeh بيدگيجه
- Village
- Location within Iran
- Coordinates: 33°34′40″N 48°43′59″E
- Country: Iran
- Province: Lorestan
- County: Khorramabad
- Bakhsh: Zagheh
- Rural District: Qaedrahmat

Population (2006)
  - Total: 164
- Time zone: UTC+3:30 (IRST)
  - Summer (DST): UTC+4:30 (IRDT)

Bid Gijeh (Persian: بيدگيجه, also Romanized as Bīd Gījeh and Bīd Kījeh) is a village in Qaedrahmat Rural District, Zagheh District, Khorramabad County, Lorestan Province, Iran. At the 2006 census, its population was 164, in 33 families.
