= Beshteh Var =

Beshteh Var بشته وار
- Village
- Country: Iran
- Province: Lorestan
- County: Delfan
- Bakhsh: Kakavand
- Rural District: Kakavand-e Gharbi

Population (2006)
  - Total: 28
- Time zone: UTC+3:30 (IRST)
  - Summer (DST): UTC+4:30 (IRDT)

Beshteh Var (Persian: بشته وار, also Romanized as Beshteh Vār) is a village in Kakavand-e Gharbi Rural District, Kakavand District, Delfan County, Lorestan Province, Iran. At the 2006 census, its population was 28, in 7 families.
