= Chenar Heyl =

Chenar Heyl چنارهيل
- Village
- Location within Iran
- Coordinates: 34°03′36″N 47°42′36″E
- Country: Iran
- Province: Lorestan
- County: Delfan
- Bakhsh: Kakavand
- Rural District: Kakavand-e Gharbi

Population (2006)
  - Total: 42
- Time zone: UTC+3:30 (IRST)
  - Summer (DST): UTC+4:30 (IRDT)

Chenar Heyl (Persian: چنارهيل, also Romanized as Chenār Heyl; also known as Chenar) is a village in Kakavand-e Gharbi Rural District, Kakavand District, Delfan County, Lorestan Province, Iran. At the 2006 census, its population was 42, in 7 families.
