= Ali Mohammad Beygi =

Ali Mohammad Beygi علي محمدبيگي
- Village
- Location within Iran
- Coordinates: 33°27′40″N 48°18′10″E
- Country: Iran
- Province: Lorestan
- County: Khorramabad
- Bakhsh: Central
- Rural District: Koregah-e Gharbi

Population (2006)
  - Total: 88
- Time zone: UTC+3:30 (IRST)
  - Summer (DST): UTC+4:30 (IRDT)

Ali Mohammad Beygi (Persian: علي محمدبيگي, also Romanized as ‘Alī Moḩammad Beygī and ‘Alī Moḩammad Bekī) is a village in Koregah-e Gharbi Rural District, in the Central District of Khorramabad County, Lorestan Province, Iran. At the 2006 census, its population was 88, in 16 families.
