= Lazgireh =

Lazgireh لازگيره
- Village
- Location within Iran
- Coordinates: 33°15′10″N 48°52′21″E
- Country: Iran
- Province: Lorestan
- County: Khorramabad
- Bakhsh: Papi
- Rural District: Sepiddasht

Population (2006)
  - Total: 47
- Time zone: UTC+3:30 (IRST)
  - Summer (DST): UTC+4:30 (IRDT)

Lazgireh (Persian: لازگيره, also Romanized as Lāzgīreh; also known as Lārīzeh and Lāzīreh) is a village in Sepiddasht Rural District, Papi District, Khorramabad County, Lorestan Province, Iran. At the 2006 census, its population was 47, in 6 families.
