= Barg-e Najaf =

Barg-e Najaf برگنجف
- Village
- Location within Iran
- Coordinates: 33°16′01″N 48°42′49″E
- Country: Iran
- Province: Lorestan
- County: Khorramabad
- Bakhsh: Papi
- Rural District: Gerit

Population (2006)
  - Total: 122
- Time zone: UTC+3:30 (IRST)
  - Summer (DST): UTC+4:30 (IRDT)

Barg-e Najaf (Persian: برگنجف, also Romanized as Barg-e Najaft; also known as Najaft) is a village in Gerit Rural District, Papi District, Khorramabad County, Lorestan Province, Iran. At the 2006 census, its population was 122, across 23 families.
