= Darreh-ye Qasem Ali =

Darreh-ye Qasem Ali دره قاسمعلي
- Village
- Location within Iran
- Coordinates: 33°34′05″N 48°27′03″E
- Country: Iran
- Province: Lorestan
- County: Khorramabad
- Bakhsh: Central
- Rural District: Dehpir-e Shomali

Population (2006)
  - Total: 70
- Time zone: UTC+3:30 (IRST)
  - Summer (DST): UTC+4:30 (IRDT)

Darreh-ye Qasem Ali (Persian: دره قاسمعلي, also Romanized as Darreh-ye Qāsem 'Alī) is a village in Dehpir-e Shomali Rural District, in the Central District of Khorramabad County, Lorestan province, Iran. At the 2006 census, its population was 70, in 16 families.
