= Cheshmeh-ye Papi =

Cheshmeh-ye Papi چشمه پاپي
- Village
- Location within Iran
- Coordinates: 33°32′05″N 48°29′01″E
- Country: Iran
- Province: Lorestan
- County: Khorramabad
- Bakhsh: Central
- Rural District: Dehpir-e Shomali

Population (2006)
  - Total: 263
- Time zone: UTC+3:30 (IRST)
  - Summer (DST): UTC+4:30 (IRDT)

Cheshmeh-ye Papi (Persian: چشمه پاپي, also Romanized as Cheshmeh-ye Pāpī; also known as Cheshmeh-ye Pā’ī) is a village in Dehpir-e Shomali Rural District, in the Central District of Khorramabad County, Lorestan province, Iran. At the 2006 census, its population was 263, in 49 families.
