= Pir Mahi =

Pir Mahi پيرماهي
- Village
- Location within Iran
- Coordinates: 33°42′16″N 48°27′18″E
- Country: Iran
- Province: Lorestan
- County: Khorramabad
- Bakhsh: Bayravand
- Rural District: Beyranvand-e Shomali

Population (2006)
  - Total: 112
- Time zone: UTC+3:30 (IRST)
  - Summer (DST): UTC+4:30 (IRDT)

Pir Mahi (Persian: پيرماهي, also Romanized as Pīr Māhī) is a village in Beyranvand-e Shomali Rural District, Bayravand District, Khorramabad County, Lorestan Province, Iran. At the 2006 census, its population was 112, in 21 families.
