= Pineh Kuh, Lorestan =

Pineh Kuh پينه كوه
- Village
- Location within Iran
- Coordinates: 33°34′48″N 48°19′48″E
- Country: Iran
- Province: Lorestan
- County: Khorramabad
- Bakhsh: Central
- Rural District: Robat

Population (2006)
  - Total: 39
- Time zone: UTC+3:30 (IRST)
  - Summer (DST): UTC+4:30 (IRDT)

Pineh Kuh (Persian: پينه كوه, also Romanized as Pīneh Kūh) is a village in Robat Rural District, in the Central District of Khorramabad County, Lorestan Province, Iran. At the 2006 census, its population was 39, in 9 families.
