= Pakabud =

Pakabud پاكبود
- Village
- Location within Iran
- Coordinates: 33°10′31″N 48°50′43″E
- Country: Iran
- Province: Lorestan
- County: Khorramabad
- Bakhsh: Papi
- Rural District: Sepiddasht

Population (2006)
  - Total: 93
- Time zone: UTC+3:30 (IRST)
  - Summer (DST): UTC+4:30 (IRDT)

Pakabud (Persian: پاكبود, also Romanized as Pāḵabūd) is a village in Sepiddasht Rural District, Papi District, Khorramabad County, Lorestan Province, Iran. At the 2006 census, its population was 93, in 17 families.
