= Girj Gerdeh =

Girj Gerdeh گيرج گرده
- Village
- Location within Iran
- Coordinates: 33°22′44″N 48°27′58″E
- Country: Iran
- Province: Lorestan
- County: Khorramabad
- Bakhsh: Central
- Rural District: Koregah-e Sharqi

Population (2006)
  - Total: 51
- Time zone: UTC+3:30 (IRST)
  - Summer (DST): UTC+4:30 (IRDT)

Girj Gerdeh (Persian: گيرج گرده, also Romanized as Grīj Gerdeh; also known as Kach Kardeh, Gīj Gardan, Gīj Gerdeh, and Gīrj Gereh) is a village in Koregah-e Sharqi Rural District, in the Central District of Khorramabad County, Lorestan Province, Iran. At the 2006 census, its population was 51, in 12 families.
