= Cheshmeh Kuh Hoseynabad =

Cheshmeh Kuh Hoseynabad چشمه کوه حسين آباد
- Village
- Country: Iran
- Province: Lorestan
- County: Delfan
- Bakhsh: Kakavand
- Rural District: Kakavand-e Sharqi

Population (2006)
  - Total: 31
- Time zone: UTC+3:30 (IRST)
  - Summer (DST): UTC+4:30 (IRDT)

Cheshmeh Kuh Hoseynabad (Persian: چشمه کوه حسين آباد, also Romanized as Cheshmeh Kūh Hoseynābād) is a village in Kakavand-e Sharqi Rural District, Kakavand District, Delfan County, Lorestan Province, Iran. At the 2006 census, its population was 31, in 6 families.
