= Melhu Azim Khan =

Melhu Azim Khan ملهوعظيم خان
- Village
- Country: Iran
- Province: Lorestan
- County: Delfan
- Bakhsh: Kakavand
- Rural District: Kakavand-e Gharbi

Population (2006)
  - Total: 35
- Time zone: UTC+3:30 (IRST)
  - Summer (DST): UTC+4:30 (IRDT)

Melhu Azim Khan (Persian: ملهوعظيم خان, also Romanized as Melhū ʿAẓīm Khān) is a village in Kakavand-e Gharbi Rural District, Kakavand District, Delfan County, Lorestan Province, Iran. At the 2006 census, its population was 35, in 8 families.
