= Cheshmeh Kamareh =

Cheshmeh Kamareh چشمه كمره
- Village
- Location within Iran
- Coordinates: 34°09′00″N 47°48′48″E
- Country: Iran
- Province: Lorestan
- County: Delfan
- Bakhsh: Central
- Rural District: Nurabad

Population (2006)
  - Total: 22
- Time zone: UTC+3:30 (IRST)
  - Summer (DST): UTC+4:30 (IRDT)

Cheshmeh Kamareh (Persian: چشمه كمره) is a village in Nurabad Rural District, in the Central District of Delfan County, Lorestan Province, Iran. At the 2006 census, its population was 22, in 7 families.
