= Seyl Reza =

Seyl Reza سيل رضا
- Village
- Location within Iran
- Coordinates: 33°33′51″N 48°46′51″E
- Country: Iran
- Province: Lorestan
- County: Khorramabad
- Bakhsh: Zagheh
- Rural District: Qaedrahmat

Population (2006)
  - Total: 105
- Time zone: UTC+3:30 (IRST)
  - Summer (DST): UTC+4:30 (IRDT)

Seyl Reza (Persian: سيل رضا, also Romanized as Seyl Reẕā) is a village in Qaedrahmat Rural District, Zagheh District, Khorramabad County, Lorestan Province, Iran. At the 2006 census, its population was 105, in 18 families.
