= Shabi Khun Meleh Sorkheh =

Shabi Khun Meleh Sorkheh شبی‌خون مله‌سرخه
- Village
- Country: Iran
- Province: Lorestan
- County: Khorramabad
- Bakhsh: Central
- Rural District: Robat

Population (2006)
  - Total: 49
- Time zone: UTC+3:30 (IRST)
  - Summer (DST): UTC+4:30 (IRDT)

Shabi Khun Meleh Sorkheh (Persian: شبی‌خون مله‌سرخه, also Romanized as Shabī Khūn Meleh Sorkheh) is a village in Robat Rural District, in the Central District of Khorramabad County, Lorestan Province, Iran. At the 2006 census, its population was 49, in 9 families.
