= Bord Luseh =

Bord Luseh بردلوسه
- Village
- Location within Iran
- Coordinates: 33°08′23″N 48°49′52″E
- Country: Iran
- Province: Lorestan
- County: Khorramabad
- Bakhsh: Papi
- Rural District: Chamsangar

Population (2006)
  - Total: 72
- Time zone: UTC+3:30 (IRST)
  - Summer (DST): UTC+4:30 (IRDT)

Bord Luseh (Persian: بردلوسه, also Romanized as Bord Lūseh) is a village in Chamsangar Rural District, Papi District, Khorramabad County, Lorestan Province, Iran. At the 2006 census, its population was 72, in 14 families.
