= Teymur Golam Bahri =

Teymur Golam Bahri تيمورگلام بهري
- Village
- Country: Iran
- Province: Lorestan
- County: Delfan
- Bakhsh: Central
- Rural District: Nurali

Population (2006)
  - Total: 185
- Time zone: UTC+3:30 (IRST)
  - Summer (DST): UTC+4:30 (IRDT)

Teymur Golam Bahri (Persian: تيمورگلام بهري, also Romanized as Teymūr Golām Bahrī) is a village in Nurali Rural District, in the Central District of Delfan County, Lorestan Province, Iran. At the 2006 census, its population was 185, in 42 families.
