= Bukeh Dar =

Bukeh Dar بوكدر
- Village
- Location within Iran
- Coordinates: 33°12′31″N 48°53′18″E
- Country: Iran
- Province: Lorestan
- County: Khorramabad
- Bakhsh: Papi
- Rural District: Sepiddasht

Population (2006)
  - Total: 136
- Time zone: UTC+3:30 (IRST)
  - Summer (DST): UTC+4:30 (IRDT)

Bukeh Dar (Persian: بوكدر, also Romanized as Būkeh Dar) is a village in Sepiddasht Rural District, Papi District, Khorramabad County, Lorestan Province, Iran. At the 2006 census, its population was 136, in 23 families.
