= Tuh Tangeh =

Tuh Tangeh توه تنگه
- Village
- Country: Iran
- Province: Lorestan
- County: Khorramabad
- Bakhsh: Central
- Rural District: Koregah-e Gharbi

Population (2006)
  - Total: 44
- Time zone: UTC+3:30 (IRST)
  - Summer (DST): UTC+4:30 (IRDT)

Tuh Tangeh (Persian: توه تنگه, also Romanized as Tūh Tangeh) is a village in Koregah-e Gharbi Rural District, in the Central District of Khorramabad County, Lorestan Province, Iran. At the 2006 census, its population was 44, in 9 families.
