= Sal Hamid =

Sal Hamid سال حميد
- Village
- Location within Iran
- Coordinates: 33°01′25″N 48°40′10″E
- Country: Iran
- Province: Lorestan
- County: Khorramabad
- Bakhsh: Papi
- Rural District: Tang-e Haft

Population (2006)
  - Total: 35
- Time zone: UTC+3:30 (IRST)
  - Summer (DST): UTC+4:30 (IRDT)

Sal Hamid (Persian: سال حميد, also Romanized as Şāl Ḩamīd; also known as Şāleḩ Ḩamīd) is a village in Tang-e Haft Rural District, Papi District, Khorramabad County, Lorestan Province, Iran. At the 2006 census, its population was 35, in 8 families.
