= Mokhtavai =

Mokhtavai مختوائي
- Village
- Location within Iran
- Coordinates: 33°38′00″N 48°32′00″E
- Country: Iran
- Province: Lorestan
- County: Khorramabad
- Bakhsh: Bayravand
- Rural District: Beyranvand-e Jonubi

Population (2006)
  - Total: 161
- Time zone: UTC+3:30 (IRST)
  - Summer (DST): UTC+4:30 (IRDT)

Mokhtavai (Persian: مختوائي, also Romanized as Mokhtavā’ī; also known as Mokhtābādī, Mokhtavāy, and Mokhtavāy-ye ‘Olyā) is a village in Beyranvand-e Jonubi Rural District, Bayravand District, Khorramabad County, Lorestan Province, Iran. At the 2006 census, its population was 161, in 34 families.
