= Sarab-e Darai =

Sarab-e Darai سراب دارائي
- Village
- Location within Iran
- Coordinates: 33°35′52″N 48°32′10″E
- Country: Iran
- Province: Lorestan
- County: Khorramabad
- Bakhsh: Bayravand
- Rural District: Beyranvand-e Jonubi

Population (2006)
  - Total: 36
- Time zone: UTC+3:30 (IRST)
  - Summer (DST): UTC+4:30 (IRDT)

Sarab-e Darai (Persian: سراب دارائي, also Romanized as Sarāb-e Dārā’ī; also known as Sarsarāb-e Dārā’ī) is a village in Beyranvand-e Jonubi Rural District, Bayravand District, Khorramabad County, Lorestan Province, Iran. In 2006, its population was 36, in 8 families.
