= Tutdar =

Tutdar توتدر
- Village
- Location within Iran
- Coordinates: 33°09′00″N 48°45′00″E
- Country: Iran
- Province: Lorestan
- County: Khorramabad
- Bakhsh: Papi
- Rural District: Chamsangar

Population (2006)
  - Total: 48
- Time zone: UTC+3:30 (IRST)
  - Summer (DST): UTC+4:30 (IRDT)

Tutdar (Persian: توتدر, also Romanized as Tūtdar) is a village in Chamsangar Rural District, Papi District, Khorramabad County, Lorestan Province, Iran. At the 2006 census, its population was 48, in 8 families.
