= Gasehabad =

Gasehabad گسه اباد
- Village
- Location within Iran
- Coordinates: 33°25′42″N 48°37′55″E
- Country: Iran
- Province: Lorestan
- County: Khorramabad
- Bakhsh: Central
- Rural District: Azna

Population (2006)
  - Total: 78
- Time zone: UTC+3:30 (IRST)
  - Summer (DST): UTC+4:30 (IRDT)

Gasehabad (Persian: گسه اباد, also Romanized as Gasehābād, Kasehābād, and Kasāābād) is a village in Azna Rural District, in the Central District of Khorramabad County, Lorestan Province, Iran. At the 2006 census, its population was 78, in 18 families.
