= Rajabad =

Rajabad رج آباد
- Village
- Location within Iran
- Coordinates: 33°15′39″N 48°42′50″E
- Country: Iran
- Province: Lorestan
- County: Khorramabad
- Bakhsh: Papi
- Rural District: Gerit

Population (2006)
  - Total: 22
- Time zone: UTC+3:30 (IRST)
  - Summer (DST): UTC+4:30 (IRDT)

Rajabad (Persian: رج آباد, also Romanized as Rajābād; also known as Deh Kaleh) is a village in Gerit Rural District, Papi District, Khorramabad County, Lorestan Province, Iran. At the 2006 census, its population was 22, in 4 families.
