= Muraz-e Musa =

Muraz-e Musa مورازموسي
- Village
- Location within Iran
- Coordinates: 33°08′19″N 48°50′28″E
- Country: Iran
- Province: Lorestan
- County: Khorramabad
- Bakhsh: Papi
- Rural District: Chamsangar

Population (2006)
  - Total: 51
- Time zone: UTC+3:30 (IRST)
  - Summer (DST): UTC+4:30 (IRDT)

Muraz-e Musa (Persian: مورازموسي, also Romanized as Mūrāz-e Mūsá) is a village in Chamsangar Rural District, Papi District, Khorramabad County, Lorestan Province, Iran. At the 2006 census, its population was 51, in 9 families.
