= Bang Puleh =

Bang Puleh بنگ پيله
- Village
- Location within Iran
- Coordinates: 33°16′28″N 48°43′32″E
- Country: Iran
- Province: Lorestan
- County: Khorramabad
- Bakhsh: Papi
- Rural District: Gerit

Population (2006)
  - Total: 29
- Time zone: UTC+3:30 (IRST)
  - Summer (DST): UTC+4:30 (IRDT)

Bang Puleh (Persian: بنگ پيله, also Romanized as Bang Pūleh) is a village in Gerit Rural District, Papi District, Khorramabad County, Lorestan Province, Iran. At the 2006 census, its population was 29, in 5 families.
