= Khoshaki =

Khoshaki خشكي
- Village
- Location within Iran
- Coordinates: 33°11′51″N 48°51′38″E
- Country: Iran
- Province: Lorestan
- County: Khorramabad
- Bakhsh: Papi
- Rural District: Sepiddasht

Population (2006)
  - Total: 60
- Time zone: UTC+3:30 (IRST)
  - Summer (DST): UTC+4:30 (IRDT)

Khoshaki (Persian: خشكي, also Romanized as Khoshakī; also known as Cham Khoshkeh) is a village in Sepiddasht Rural District, Papi District, Khorramabad County, Lorestan Province, Iran. At the 2006 census, its population was 60, in 10 families.
