= Qaleh-ye Hadi Chakmeh Siah =

Qaleh-ye Hadi Chakmeh Siah قلعه هادي چكمه سياه
- Village
- Location within Iran
- Coordinates: 33°28′45″N 48°48′24″E
- Country: Iran
- Province: Lorestan
- County: Khorramabad
- Bakhsh: Zagheh
- Rural District: Qaedrahmat

Population (2006)
  - Total: 120
- Time zone: UTC+3:30 (IRST)
  - Summer (DST): UTC+4:30 (IRDT)

Qaleh-ye Hadi Chakmeh Siah (Persian: قلعه هادي چكمه سياه, also Romanized as Qal‘eh-ye Hādī Chakmeh Sīāh and Qal‘eh Ḩadī Chakmeh Seyāh; also known as Chakmeh Seyāh, Chakmeh Sīāh, and Qal‘eh-ye Hādī) is a village in Qaedrahmat Rural District, Zagheh District, Khorramabad County, Lorestan Province, Iran. At the 2006 census, its population was 120, in 25 families.
