= Majeshti =

Majeshti مجشتي
- Village
- Location within Iran
- Coordinates: 34°09′38″N 47°33′49″E
- Country: Iran
- Province: Lorestan
- County: Delfan
- Bakhsh: Kakavand
- Rural District: Kakavand-e Gharbi

Population (2006)
  - Total: 43
- Time zone: UTC+3:30 (IRST)
  - Summer (DST): UTC+4:30 (IRDT)

Majeshti (Persian: مجشتي, also Romanized as Majeshtī, Machasht, Māchashtī , Mah Jashtī, Mahjeshti, Majashti, and Majestī) is a village in Kakavand-e Gharbi Rural District, Kakavand District, Delfan County, Lorestan Province, Iran. At the 2006 census, its population was 43, in 8 families.
