= Sar Kyu =

Sar Kyu سركيو
- Village
- Country: Iran
- Province: Lorestan
- County: Khorramabad
- Bakhsh: Papi
- Rural District: Chamsangar

Population (2006)
  - Total: 45
- Time zone: UTC+3:30 (IRST)
  - Summer (DST): UTC+4:30 (IRDT)

Sar Kyu (Persian: سركيو, also Romanized as Sar Kyū) is a village in Chamsangar Rural District, Papi District, Khorramabad County, Lorestan Province, Iran. At the 2006 census, its population was 45, in 5 families.
