= Bavlin =

Bavlin باولين
- Village
- Country: Iran
- Province: Lorestan
- County: Delfan
- Bakhsh: Kakavand
- Rural District: Kakavand-e Gharbi

Population (2006)
  - Total: 18
- Time zone: UTC+3:30 (IRST)
  - Summer (DST): UTC+4:30 (IRDT)

Bavlin (Persian: باولين, also Romanized as Bāvlīn; also known as Emamzadegan Ahmed va Mahmud (Persian: امامزادگان احمد و محمود), also Romanized as Emāmzādegān Āḥmed va Maḥmūd) is a village in Kakavand-e Gharbi Rural District, Kakavand District, Delfan County, Lorestan Province, Iran. At the 2006 census, its population was 18, in 4 families.
