= Darsun =

Darsun درسون
- Village
- Location within Iran
- Coordinates: 33°12′49″N 48°54′53″E
- Country: Iran
- Province: Lorestan
- County: Khorramabad
- Bakhsh: Papi
- Rural District: Sepiddasht

Population (2006)
  - Total: 50
- Time zone: UTC+3:30 (IRST)
  - Summer (DST): UTC+4:30 (IRDT)

Darsun (Persian: درسون, also Romanized as Darsūn and Darreh Sūn) is a village in Sepiddasht Rural District, Papi District, Khorramabad County, Lorestan Province, Iran. At the 2006 census, its population was 50 consisting of 8 families.

== Geography ==
Darsun is found in western Iran, a region dominated by the Zagros Mountains. The village's terrain is primarily rugged, resulting in cooler climates and access to mountain springs and streams. Such geography shapes the agricultural and animal husbandry practices in the area.
