= Bardastemal =

Bardastemal بردستمال
- Village
- Country: Iran
- Province: Lorestan
- County: Khorramabad
- Bakhsh: Papi
- Rural District: Tang-e Haft

Population (2006)
  - Total: 15
- Time zone: UTC+3:30 (IRST)
  - Summer (DST): UTC+4:30 (IRDT)

Bardastemal (Persian: بردستمال, also Romanized as Bardastemāl) is a village in Tang-e Haft Rural District, Papi District, Khorramabad County, Lorestan Province, Iran. At the 2006 census, its population was 15, in 4 families.
