= Mordeh Shureh-ye Posht Tang =

Mordeh Shureh-ye Posht Tang مرده شور پشت تنگ
- Village
- Location within Iran
- Coordinates: 34°16′15″N 47°48′37″E
- Country: Iran
- Province: Lorestan
- County: Delfan
- Bakhsh: Kakavand
- Rural District: Kakavand-e Sharqi

Population (2006)
  - Total: 80
- Time zone: UTC+3:30 (IRST)
  - Summer (DST): UTC+4:30 (IRDT)

Mordeh Shureh-ye Posht Tang (Persian: مرده شور پشت تنگ, also Romanized as Mordeh Shūreh-ye Posht Tang; also known as Mordeh Shūr Khāneh) is a village in Kakavand-e Sharqi Rural District, Kakavand District, Delfan County, Lorestan Province, Iran. At the 2006 census, its population was 80, in 16 families.
