= Beralikeh =

Beralikeh براليكه
- Village
- Location within Iran
- Coordinates: 33°40′32″N 48°19′34″E
- Country: Iran
- Province: Lorestan
- County: Khorramabad
- Bakhsh: Central
- Rural District: Robat

Population (2006)
  - Total: 64
- Time zone: UTC+3:30 (IRST)
  - Summer (DST): UTC+4:30 (IRDT)

Beralikeh (Persian: براليكه, also Romanized as Berālīkeh and Barālīkeh) is a village in Robat Rural District, in the Central District of Khorramabad County, Lorestan Province, Iran. At the 2006 census, its population was 64, in 17 families.
