= Bagh Kerah =

Bagh Kerah باغ كره
- Village
- Location within Iran
- Coordinates: 34°03′00″N 47°34′00″E
- Country: Iran
- Province: Lorestan
- County: Delfan
- Bakhsh: Kakavand
- Rural District: Kakavand-e Gharbi

Population (2006)
  - Total: 153
- Time zone: UTC+3:30 (IRST)
  - Summer (DST): UTC+4:30 (IRDT)

Bagh Kerah (Persian: باغ كره, also Romanized as Bāgh Kerah) is a village in Kakavand-e Gharbi Rural District, Kakavand District, Delfan County, Lorestan Province, Iran. At the 2006 census, its population was 153, in 31 families.
