= Baba Mohammad Sanjabi =

Baba Mohammad Sanjabi بابا محمد سنجابي
- Village
- Location within Iran
- Coordinates: 34°09′14″N 47°56′36″E
- Country: Iran
- Province: Lorestan
- County: Delfan
- Bakhsh: Central
- Rural District: Nurali

Population (2006)
  - Total: 201
- Time zone: UTC+3:30 (IRST)
  - Summer (DST): UTC+4:30 (IRDT)

Baba Mohammad Sanjabi (Persian: بابا محمد سنجابي, also Romanized as Bābā Moḩammad Sanjābī; also known as Bābā Moḩammad) is a village in Nurali Rural District, in the Central District of Delfan County, Lorestan Province, Iran. At the 2006 census, its population was 201, in 42 families.
