= Sarab-e Bardin =

Sarab-e Bardin سراببردين
- Village
- Location within Iran
- Coordinates: 33°37′14″N 48°19′47″E
- Country: Iran
- Province: Lorestan
- County: Khorramabad
- Bakhsh: Central
- Rural District: Robat

Population (2006)
  - Total: 140
- Time zone: UTC+3:30 (IRST)
  - Summer (DST): UTC+4:30 (IRDT)

Sarab-e Bardin (Persian: سراببردين, also Romanized as Sarāb-e Bardīn and Sarābardīn) is a village in Robat Rural District, in the Central District of Khorramabad County, Lorestan Province, Iran. At the 2006 census, its population was 140, in 25 families.
