= Seyl Karim =

Seyl Karim سيل كريم
- Village
- Location within Iran
- Coordinates: 33°34′10″N 48°46′04″E
- Country: Iran
- Province: Lorestan
- County: Khorramabad
- Bakhsh: Zagheh
- Rural District: Qaedrahmat

Population (2006)
  - Total: 100
- Time zone: UTC+3:30 (IRST)
  - Summer (DST): UTC+4:30 (IRDT)

Seyl Karim (Persian: سيل كريم, also Romanized as Seyl Karīm) is a village in Qaedrahmat Rural District, Zagheh District, Khorramabad County, Lorestan Province, Iran. At the 2006 census, its population was 100, in 20 families.
