= Qaleh-ye Hajji Rahmatollah =

Village in Lorestan, Iran

Qaleh-ye Hajji Rahmatollah قلعه حاجي رحمت اله
- Village
- Location within Iran
- Coordinates: 33°32′04″N 48°42′20″E
- Country: Iran
- Province: Lorestan
- County: Khorramabad
- Bakhsh: Zagheh
- Rural District: Zagheh

Population (2006)
  - Total: 76
- Time zone: UTC+3:30 (IRST)
  - Summer (DST): UTC+4:30 (IRDT)

Qaleh-ye Hajji Rahmatollah (Persian: قلعه حاجي رحمت اله, also Romanized as Qal‘eh-ye Ḩājjī Raḩmatollāh; also known as Qal‘eh-ye Jūjeh Sī, Qal‘eh-ye Jūjeh Sīh, Qal‘eh-ye Raḩmatollāh, and Qal‘eh Jūjeh Sīh) is a village in Zagheh Rural District, Zagheh District, Khorramabad County, Lorestan Province, Iran. At the 2006 census, its population was 76, in 21 families.
