= Musa Vand =

Musa Vand موسيوند
- Village
- Location within Iran
- Coordinates: 33°38′36″N 48°31′21″E
- Country: Iran
- Province: Lorestan
- County: Khorramabad
- Bakhsh: Bayravand
- Rural District: Beyranvand-e Jonubi

Population (2006)
  - Total: 16
- Time zone: UTC+3:30 (IRST)
  - Summer (DST): UTC+4:30 (IRDT)

Musa Vand (Persian: موسيوند, also Romanized as Mūsá Vand, Mūsá Vandī, and Mūsīvand; also known as Sarab-e Mūsá Valadī and Sarab-e Mūsīvardī) is a village in Beyranvand-e Jonubi Rural District, Bayravand District, Khorramabad County, Lorestan Province, Iran. At the 2006 census, its population was 16, in 5 families.
