= Avaseh Amid Ali =

Avaseh Amid Ali اوسه اميدعلي
- Village
- Country: Iran
- Province: Lorestan
- County: Khorramabad
- Bakhsh: Papi
- Rural District: Tang-e Haft

Population (2006)
  - Total: 29
- Time zone: UTC+3:30 (IRST)
  - Summer (DST): UTC+4:30 (IRDT)

Avaseh Amid Ali (Persian: اوسه اميدعلي, also Romanized as Āvaseh Āmīd ʿAlī) is a village in Tang-e Haft Rural District, Papi District, Khorramabad County, Lorestan Province, Iran. At the 2006 census, its population was 29, in 4 families.
