= Nabivand =

Nabivand نبي وند
- Village
- Location within Iran
- Coordinates: 34°09′01″N 48°00′03″E
- Country: Iran
- Province: Lorestan
- County: Delfan
- Bakhsh: Central
- Rural District: Nurali

Population (2006)
  - Total: 387
- Time zone: UTC+3:30 (IRST)
  - Summer (DST): UTC+4:30 (IRDT)

Nabivand (Persian: نبي وند, also Romanized as Nabīvand; also known as Banīvand) is a village in Nurali Rural District, in the Central District of Delfan County, Lorestan Province, Iran. At the 2006 census, its population was 387, in 97 families.
