= Khalaj Darreh =

Khalaj Darreh خلج دره
- Village
- Location within Iran
- Coordinates: 33°32′16″N 48°44′49″E
- Country: Iran
- Province: Lorestan
- County: Khorramabad
- Bakhsh: Zagheh
- Rural District: Qaedrahmat

Population (2006)
  - Total: 135
- Time zone: UTC+3:30 (IRST)
  - Summer (DST): UTC+4:30 (IRDT)

Khalaj Darreh (Persian: خلج دره) is a village in Qaedrahmat Rural District, Zagheh District, Khorramabad County, Lorestan Province, Iran. At the 2006 census, its population was 135, in 29 families.
