= Nowmaleh =

Nowmaleh نوماله
- Village
- Location within Iran
- Coordinates: 33°31′10″N 48°46′44″E
- Country: Iran
- Province: Lorestan
- County: Khorramabad
- Bakhsh: Zagheh
- Rural District: Qaedrahmat

Population (2006)
  - Total: 41
- Time zone: UTC+3:30 (IRST)
  - Summer (DST): UTC+4:30 (IRDT)

Nowmaleh (Persian: نوماله, also Romanized as Nowmāleh; also known as Nowmāleh-ye ‘Olyā) is a village in Qaedrahmat Rural District, Zagheh District, Khorramabad County, Lorestan Province, Iran. At the 2006 census, its population was 41, in 9 families.
