= Gorz Kol =

Gorz Kol گرزكل
- Village
- Location within Iran
- Coordinates: 33°35′35″N 48°36′03″E
- Country: Iran
- Province: Lorestan
- County: Khorramabad
- Bakhsh: Bayravand
- Rural District: Beyranvand-e Jonubi

Population (2006)
  - Total: 33
- Time zone: UTC+3:30 (IRST)
  - Summer (DST): UTC+4:30 (IRDT)

Gorz Kol (Persian: گرزكل, also Romanized as Gorz Gol) is a village in Beyranvand-e Jonubi Rural District, Bayravand District, Khorramabad County, Lorestan Province, Iran. At the 2006 census, its population was 33, in 9 families.
