= Band Jub-e Do =

Band Jub-e Do بندجوب دو
- Village
- Location within Iran
- Coordinates: 33°38′52″N 48°35′30″E
- Country: Iran
- Province: Lorestan
- County: Khorramabad
- Bakhsh: Bayravand
- Rural District: Beyranvand-e Jonubi

Population (2006)
  - Total: 49
- Time zone: UTC+3:30 (IRST)
  - Summer (DST): UTC+4:30 (IRDT)

Band Jub-e Do (Persian: بندجوب دو, also Romanized as Band Jūb-e Do, meaning "Band Jub 2"; also known as Band-e Jūb, Bandjūb, and Band Jūb-e Chahār Borjī-ye Do) is a village in Beyranvand-e Jonubi Rural District, Bayravand District, Khorramabad County, Lorestan Province, Iran. At the 2006 census, its population was 49, in 10 families.
