= Eyvashan Golestan =

Eyvashan Golstan ايوشان گلستان
- Village
- Location within Iran
- Coordinates: 33°30′11″N 48°52′26″E
- Country: Iran
- Province: Lorestan
- County: Khorramabad
- Bakhsh: Zagheh
- Rural District: Qaedrahmat

Population (2006)
  - Total: 48
- Time zone: UTC+3:30 (IRST)
  - Summer (DST): UTC+4:30 (IRDT)

Eyvashan Golstan (Persian: ايوشان گلستان, also Romanized as Eyvashān Golestān; also known as Eyvashān, ‘Eyvashān Seyl, ‘Eyvashān Sīl, and Yebāsūn) is a village in Qaedrahmat Rural District, Zagheh District, Khorramabad County, Lorestan Province, Iran. At the 2006 census, its population was 48, in 9 families.
