= Cheshmeh Paryan =

Cheshmeh Paryan چشمه پريان
- Village
- Location within Iran
- Coordinates: 33°19′56″N 48°54′12″E
- Country: Iran
- Province: Lorestan
- County: Khorramabad
- Bakhsh: Papi
- Rural District: Sepiddasht

Population (2006)
  - Total: 148
- Time zone: UTC+3:30 (IRST)
  - Summer (DST): UTC+4:30 (IRDT)

Cheshmeh Paryan (Persian: چشمه پريان, also Romanized as Cheshmeh Paryān and Cheshmeh-ye Paryān; also known as Cham Paryān) is a village in Sepiddasht Rural District, Papi District, Khorramabad County, Lorestan Province, Iran. At the 2006 census, its population was 148, in 27 families.
