= Shir Khani =

Shir Khani شيرخاني
- Village
- Location within Iran
- Coordinates: 33°29′05″N 48°34′44″E
- Country: Iran
- Province: Lorestan
- County: Khorramabad
- Bakhsh: Zagheh
- Rural District: Zagheh

Population (2006)
  - Total: 93
- Time zone: UTC+3:30 (IRST)
  - Summer (DST): UTC+4:30 (IRDT)

Shir Khani (Persian: شيرخاني, also Romanized as Shīr Khānī) is a village in Zagheh Rural District, Zagheh District, Khorramabad County, Lorestan Province, Iran. At the 2006 census, its population was 80, in 16 families.
