= Qaleh-ye Mir Ali =

Qaleh-ye Mir Ali قلعه ميرعلي
- Village
- Location within Iran
- Coordinates: 33°20′32″N 48°42′16″E
- Country: Iran
- Province: Lorestan
- County: Khorramabad
- Bakhsh: Papi
- Rural District: Gerit

Population (2006)
  - Total: 32
- Time zone: UTC+3:30 (IRST)
  - Summer (DST): UTC+4:30 (IRDT)

Qaleh-ye Mir Ali (Persian: قلعه ميرعلي, also Romanized as Qal‘eh-ye Mīr Ālī and Qal‘eh-ye Mīr‘Alī) is a village in Gerit Rural District, Papi District, Khorramabad County, Lorestan Province, Iran. At the 2006 census, its population was 32, in 8 families.
