= Kanuleh-ye Pain =

Kanuleh-ye Pain كنوله پايين
- Village
- Location within Iran
- Coordinates: 34°08′58″N 47°37′02″E
- Country: Iran
- Province: Lorestan
- County: Delfan
- Bakhsh: Kakavand
- Rural District: Kakavand-e Gharbi

Population (2006)
  - Total: 33
- Time zone: UTC+3:30 (IRST)
  - Summer (DST): UTC+4:30 (IRDT)

Kanuleh-ye Pain (Persian: كنوله پايين, also Romanized as Kanūleh-ye Pā’īn; also known as Kanūleh) is a village in Kakavand-e Gharbi Rural District, Kakavand District, Delfan County, Lorestan Province, Iran. At the 2006 census, its population was 33, in 4 families.
