= Gazleh =

Gazleh گزله
- Village
- Location within Iran
- Coordinates: 33°34′39″N 48°17′21″E
- Country: Iran
- Province: Lorestan
- County: Khorramabad
- Bakhsh: Central
- Rural District: Robat

Population (2006)
  - Total: 52
- Time zone: UTC+3:30 (IRST)
  - Summer (DST): UTC+4:30 (IRDT)

Gazleh (Persian: گزله, also known as Qazleh and Qezeleh) is a village in Robat Rural District in the Central District of Khorramabad County, Lorestan Province, Iran. At the 2006 census its population was 52, in 10 families.
