= Jashinvand =

Jashinvand جشينوند
- Village
- Country: Iran
- Province: Lorestan
- County: Delfan
- Bakhsh: Central
- Rural District: Nurali

Population (2006)
  - Total: 85
- Time zone: UTC+3:30 (IRST)
  - Summer (DST): UTC+4:30 (IRDT)

Jashinvand (Persian: جشينوند, also Romanized as Jashīnvand) is a village in Nurali Rural District, in the Central District of Delfan County, Lorestan Province, Iran. At the 2006 census, its population was 85, in 16 families.
