= Sarchak-e Dadabad =

Sarchak-e Dadabad سرچك داداباد
- Village
- Location within Iran
- Coordinates: 33°17′39″N 48°12′27″E
- Country: Iran
- Province: Lorestan
- County: Khorramabad
- Bakhsh: Central
- Rural District: Koregah-e Gharbi

Population (2006)
  - Total: 130
- Time zone: UTC+3:30 (IRST)
  - Summer (DST): UTC+4:30 (IRDT)

Sarchak-e Dadabad (Persian: سرچك داداباد, also Romanized as Sarchak-e Dādābād; also known as Sarchak-e Dādābād-e ‘Olyā, Dādābād-e ‘Olyā, and Mīr Kūchak‘alī-ye Dādābād) is a village in Koregah-e Gharbi Rural District, in the Central District of Khorramabad County, Lorestan Province, Iran. At the 2006 census, its population was 130, in 24 families.
