= Sar Poleh-ye Baba Hoseyn =

Sar Poleh-ye Baba Hoseyn سرپله باباحسين
- Village
- Location within Iran
- Coordinates: 33°23′00″N 48°26′00″E
- Country: Iran
- Province: Lorestan
- County: Khorramabad
- Bakhsh: Central
- Rural District: Koregah-e Sharqi

Population (2006)
  - Total: 43
- Time zone: UTC+3:30 (IRST)
  - Summer (DST): UTC+4:30 (IRDT)

Sar Poleh-ye Baba Hoseyn (Persian: سرپله باباحسين, also Romanized as Sar Poleh-ye Babā Ḩoseyn) is a village in Koregah-e Sharqi Rural District, in the Central District of Khorramabad County, Lorestan Province, Iran. At the 2006 census, its population was 43, in 8 families.
