= Sarab Talkh =

Sarab Talkh سراب تلخ
- Village
- Location within Iran
- Coordinates: 33°36′41″N 48°21′12″E
- Country: Iran
- Province: Lorestan
- County: Khorramabad
- Bakhsh: Central
- Rural District: Robat

Population (2006)
  - Total: 115
- Time zone: UTC+3:30 (IRST)
  - Summer (DST): UTC+4:30 (IRDT)

Sarab Talkh (Persian: سراب تلخ, also Romanized as Sarāb-e Talkh and Sarāb Talkh) is a village in Robat Rural District, in the Central District of Khorramabad County, Lorestan Province, Iran. At the 2006 census, its population was 115, in 26 families.
