= Talekstan =

Coordinates: 33.3361°N 48.9450°E

Talekstan تلكستان
- Village
- Interactive map of Talekstan
- Country: Iran
- Province: Lorestan
- County: Khorramabad
- Bakhsh: Papi
- Rural District: Sepiddasht

Population (2006)
  - Total: 90
- Time zone: UTC+3:30 (IRST)
  - Summer (DST): UTC+4:30 (IRDT)

Talekstan (Persian: تلكستان, also Romanized as Taleḵstān) is a village in Sepiddasht Rural District, Papi District, Khorramabad County, Lorestan Province, Iran. At the 2006 census, its population was 90, in 17 families.
