= Samaqaha =

Samaqaha سماقها
- Village
- Country: Iran
- Province: Lorestan
- County: Khorramabad
- Bakhsh: Papi
- Rural District: Sepiddasht

Population (2006)
  - Total: 33
- Time zone: UTC+3:30 (IRST)
  - Summer (DST): UTC+4:30 (IRDT)

Samaqaha (Persian: سماقها, also Romanized as Samāqahā) is a village in Sepiddasht Rural District, Papi District, Khorramabad County, Lorestan Province, Iran. At the 2006 census, its population was 33, in 4 families.
