= Sarastan =

Sarastan سراستان
- Village
- Location within Iran
- Coordinates: 33°31′34″N 48°23′09″E
- Country: Iran
- Province: Lorestan
- County: Khorramabad
- Bakhsh: Central
- Rural District: Dehpir-e Shomali

Population (2006)
  - Total: 20
- Time zone: UTC+3:30 (IRST)
  - Summer (DST): UTC+4:30 (IRDT)

Sarastan (Persian: سراستان, also Romanized as Sarāstān; also known as Sar Āstān-e Do) is a village in Dehpir-e Shomali Rural District, in the Central District of Khorramabad County, Lorestan Province, Iran. At the 2006 census, its population was 20, in 6 families.
