= Cham-e Gorgali =

Cham-e Gorgali چم گرگعلي
- Village
- Location within Iran
- Coordinates: 33°46′00″N 47°59′00″E
- Country: Iran
- Province: Lorestan
- County: Selseleh
- Bakhsh: Firuzabad
- Rural District: Qalayi

Population (2006)
  - Total: 76
- Time zone: UTC+3:30 (IRST)
  - Summer (DST): UTC+4:30 (IRDT)

Cham-e Gorgali (Persian: چم گرگعلي, also Romanized as Cham-e Gorg‘alī) is a village in Qalayi Rural District, Firuzabad District, Selseleh County, Lorestan province, Iran. At the 2006 census, its population was 76, in 14 families.
