= Abulabad-e Gilavand =

Abulabad-e Gilavand ابول‌آباد گيلاوند
- Village
- Location within Iran
- Coordinates: 33°22′01″N 48°35′40″E
- Country: Iran
- Province: Lorestan
- County: Khorramabad
- Bakhsh: Central
- Rural District: Azna

Population (2006)
  - Total: 86
- Time zone: UTC+3:30 (IRST)
  - Summer (DST): UTC+4:30 (IRDT)

Abulabad-e Gilavand (Persian: ابول‌آباد گيلاوند, also Romanized as Abūlābād-e Gīlāvand and Abolābād-e Gīlāvand; also known as Abūlābād) is a village in Azna Rural District, in the Central District of Khorramabad County, Lorestan Province, Iran. At the 2006 census, its population was 86, in 16 families.
