= Pankabad =

Pankabad پنك اباد
- Village
- Location within Iran
- Coordinates: 33°20′34″N 48°33′17″E
- Country: Iran
- Province: Lorestan
- County: Khorramabad
- Bakhsh: Central
- Rural District: Kakasharaf

Population (2006)
  - Total: 64
- Time zone: UTC+3:30 (IRST)
  - Summer (DST): UTC+4:30 (IRDT)

Pankabad (Persian: پنك اباد, also Romanized as Panḵābād and Pangābād) is a village in Kakasharaf Rural District, in the Central District of Khorramabad County, Lorestan Province, Iran. At the 2006 census, its population was 64, in 12 families.
