= Sarhalat =

Sarhalat سرهلت
- Village
- Location within Iran
- Coordinates: 33°27′52″N 48°14′26″E
- Country: Iran
- Province: Lorestan
- County: Khorramabad
- Bakhsh: Central
- Rural District: Koregah-e Gharbi

Population (2006)
  - Total: 144
- Time zone: UTC+3:30 (IRST)
  - Summer (DST): UTC+4:30 (IRDT)

Sarhalat (Persian: سرهلت, also Romanized as Sarḩalat and Sarḩallat) is a village in Koregah-e Gharbi Rural District, in the Central District of Khorramabad County, Lorestan Province, Iran. At the 2006 census, its population was 144, in 26 families.
