= Defkandar =

Defkandar دفكاندر
- Village
- Location within Iran
- Coordinates: 33°10′25″N 48°37′32″E
- Country: Iran
- Province: Lorestan
- County: Khorramabad
- Bakhsh: Papi
- Rural District: Keshvar

Population (2006)
  - Total: 37
- Time zone: UTC+3:30 (IRST)
  - Summer (DST): UTC+4:30 (IRDT)

Defkandar (Persian: دفكاندر, also Romanized as Defkāndar; also known as Defkūndar and Defqāndar) is a village in Keshvar Rural District, Papi District, Khorramabad County, Lorestan Province, Iran. At the 2006 census, its population was 37, in 9 families.
