= Eyvani =

Eyvani ایوانی
- Village
- Location within Iran
- Coordinates: 33°30′49″N 48°46′39″E
- Country: Iran
- Province: Lorestan
- County: Khorramabad
- Bakhsh: Zagheh
- Rural District: Qaedrahmat

Population (2006)
  - Total: 164
- Time zone: UTC+3:30 (IRST)
  - Summer (DST): UTC+4:30 (IRDT)

Eyvani (Persian: ایوانی, also Romanized as Eyvānī; also known as Ḩabvānī, Haiwāni, and Ḩeyvānī) is a village in Qaedrahmat Rural District, Zagheh District, Khorramabad County, Lorestan Province, Iran. At the 2006 census, its population was 164, in 31 families.
