= Dast Bezanu =

Dast Bezanu دستبزانو
- Village
- Location within Iran
- Coordinates: 33°26′37″N 48°17′23″E
- Country: Iran
- Province: Lorestan
- County: Khorramabad
- Bakhsh: Central
- Rural District: Koregah-e Gharbi

Population (2006)
  - Total: 127
- Time zone: UTC+3:30 (IRST)
  - Summer (DST): UTC+4:30 (IRDT)

Dast Bezanu (Persian: دستبزانو, also Romanized as Dast Bezānū) is a village in Koregah-e Gharbi Rural District, in the Central District of Khorramabad County, Lorestan Province, Iran. At the 2006 census, its population was 127, in 21 families.
