= Jorjor =

Jorjor جرجر
- Village
- Location within Iran
- Coordinates: 33°12′59″N 48°53′30″E
- Country: Iran
- Province: Lorestan
- County: Khorramabad
- Bakhsh: Papi
- Rural District: Sepiddasht

Population (2006)
  - Total: 100
- Time zone: UTC+3:30 (IRST)
  - Summer (DST): UTC+4:30 (IRDT)

Jorjor (Persian: جرجر, also known as Jorjor Darsūn) is a village in Sepiddasht Rural District, Papi District, Khorramabad County, Lorestan Province, Iran. At the 2006 census, its population was 100, in 17 families.
