= Shah-e Bozorg =

Shah-e Bozorg شاه بزرگ
- Village
- Country: Iran
- Province: Lorestan
- County: Khorramabad
- Bakhsh: Papi
- Rural District: Keshvar

Population (2006)
  - Total: 39
- Time zone: UTC+3:30 (IRST)
  - Summer (DST): UTC+4:30 (IRDT)

Shah-e Bozorg (Persian: شاه بزرگ, also Romanized as Shāh-e Bozorg) is a village in Keshvar Rural District, Papi District, Khorramabad County, Lorestan Province, Iran. At the 2006 census, its population was 39, in 10 families.
