= Qaleh Joghd =

Qaleh Joghd قلعه جغد
- Village
- Location within Iran
- Coordinates: 33°36′13″N 48°23′50″E
- Country: Iran
- Province: Lorestan
- County: Khorramabad
- Bakhsh: Central
- Rural District: Robat

Population (2006)
  - Total: 101
- Time zone: UTC+3:30 (IRST)
  - Summer (DST): UTC+4:30 (IRDT)

Qaleh Joghd (Persian: قلعه جغد, also Romanized as Qalʿeh Joghd) is a village in Robat Rural District, in the Central District of Khorramabad County, Lorestan Province, Iran. At the 2006 census, its population was 101, in 22 families.
