= Sarab-e Molla Qorbani =

Sarab-e Molla Qorbani سراب ملاقرباني
- Village
- Location within Iran
- Coordinates: 33°36′12″N 48°32′46″E
- Country: Iran
- Province: Lorestan
- County: Khorramabad
- Bakhsh: Bayravand
- Rural District: Beyranvand-e Jonubi

Population (2006)
  - Total: 117
- Time zone: UTC+3:30 (IRST)
  - Summer (DST): UTC+4:30 (IRDT)

Sarab-e Molla Qorbani (Persian: سراب ملاقرباني, also Romanized as Sarāb-e Mollā Qorbānī) is a village in Beyranvand-e Jonubi Rural District, Bayravand District, Khorramabad County, Lorestan Province, Iran. At the 2006 census, its population was 117, in 19 families.
