= Chahar Afshar-e Sofla =

Chahar Afshar-e Sofla چهارافشارسفلي
- Village
- Location within Iran
- Coordinates: 34°16′41″N 47°47′42″E
- Country: Iran
- Province: Lorestan
- County: Delfan
- Bakhsh: Kakavand
- Rural District: Kakavand-e Sharqi

Population (2006)
  - Total: 164
- Time zone: UTC+3:30 (IRST)
  - Summer (DST): UTC+4:30 (IRDT)

Chahar Afshar-e Sofla (Persian: چهارافشارسفلي, also Romanized as Chahār Afshār-e Soflá) is a village in Kakavand-e Sharqi Rural District, Kakavand District, Delfan County, Lorestan Province, Iran. At the 2006 census, its population was 164, in 37 families.
