= Cham Qoroq =

Cham Qoroq چم قرق
- Village
- Location within Iran
- Coordinates: 33°26′35″N 48°16′07″E
- Country: Iran
- Province: Lorestan
- County: Khorramabad
- Bakhsh: Central
- Rural District: Koregah-e Gharbi

Population (2006)
  - Total: 396
- Time zone: UTC+3:30 (IRST)
  - Summer (DST): UTC+4:30 (IRDT)

Cham Qoroq (Persian: چم قرق, also Romanized as Cham Ghoraq; also known as Cham Foroq) is a village in Koregah-e Gharbi Rural District, in the Central District of Khorramabad County, Lorestan Province, Iran. At the 2006 census, its population was 396, in 72 families.
