= Gerehbid =

Gerehbid گره بيد
- Village
- Location within Iran
- Coordinates: 33°20′00″N 48°13′00″E
- Country: Iran
- Province: Lorestan
- County: Khorramabad
- Bakhsh: Central
- Rural District: Koregah-e Gharbi

Population (2006)
  - Total: 94
- Time zone: UTC+3:30 (IRST)
  - Summer (DST): UTC+4:30 (IRDT)

Gerehbid (Persian: گره بيد, also Romanized as Gerehbīd; also known as Ḩājj ‘Alī-ye Gerehbīd) is a village in Koregah-e Gharbi Rural District, in the Central District of Khorramabad County, Lorestan Province, Iran. At the 2006 census, its population was 94, in 22 families.
