= Varvandi =

Varvandi وروندي
- Village
- Location within Iran
- Coordinates: 33°37′08″N 48°32′24″E
- Country: Iran
- Province: Lorestan
- County: Khorramabad
- Bakhsh: Bayravand
- Rural District: Beyranvand-e Jonubi

Population (2006)
  - Total: 52
- Time zone: UTC+3:30 (IRST)
  - Summer (DST): UTC+4:30 (IRDT)

Varvandi (Persian: وروندي, also Romanized as Varvandī) is a village in Beyranvand-e Jonubi Rural District, Bayravand District, Khorramabad County, Lorestan Province, Iran. At the 2006 census, its population was 52, in 11 families.
