= Bon Lar =

Village in Lorestan province, Iran

Bon Lar Persian: بن لار
- Village
- Location within Iran
- Coordinates: 33°20′45″N 47°45′51″E
- Country: Iran
- Province: Lorestan
- County: Mamulan
- District: Central
- Rural District: Zivdar

Population (2016)
  - Total: 1,008
- Time zone: UTC+3:30 (IRST)

Bon Lar (Persian: بن لار) (Note: Also romanized as Bon Lār; also known as Boneh-ye Lār, Būnelār, Būnhalār, Būnlār, and Būnneh Lār) is a village in, and the capital of, Zivdar Rural District in the Central District (Note: Formerly Mamulan District of Pol-e Dokhtar County) of Mamulan County, Lorestan province, Iran.

== Demographics ==
=== Population ===
At the time of the 2006 National Census, the village's population was 1,041 in 195 households, when it was in Afrineh Rural District of Mamulan District (Note: Renamed the Central District of Mamulan County) in Pol-e Dokhtar County. The following census in 2011 counted 1,103 people in 261 households. The 2016 census measured the population of the village as 1,008 people in 277 households.

In 2023, the district was separated from the county in the establishment of Mamulan County and renamed the Central District. The rural district was transferred to the new Afrineh District, and Bon Lar was transferred to Zivdar Rural District created in the Central District.
