= Zuran Tall-e Zivdar =

Village in Lorestan province, Iran

Zuran Tall-e Zivdar Persian: زورانتل زيودار
- Village
- Location within Iran
- Coordinates: 33°18′37″N 47°50′03″E
- Country: Iran
- Province: Lorestan
- County: Mamulan
- District: Central
- Rural District: Zivdar

Population (2016)
  - Total: 481
- Time zone: UTC+3:30 (IRST)

Zuran Tall-e Zivdar (Persian: زورانتل زيودار) (Note: Also romanized as Zuran Tal-e Zivdar, Zūrān Tal-e Zīvdār, and Zūrān Tall-e Zīvdār) is a village in Zivdar Rural District of the Central District (Note: Formerly Mamulan District of Pol-e Dokhtar County) in Mamulan County, Lorestan province, Iran.

== Demographics ==
=== Population ===
At the time of the 2006 National Census, the village's population was 460 in 99 households, when it was in Afrineh Rural District of Mamulan District (Note: Renamed the Central District of Mamulan County) in Pol-e Dokhtar County. The following census in 2011 counted 295 people in 76 households. The 2016 census measured the population of the village as 481 people in 134 households.

In 2023, the district was separated from the county in the establishment of Mamulan County and renamed the Central District. The rural district was transferred to the new Afrineh District, and Zuran Tall-e Zivdar was transferred to Zivdar Rural District created in the Central District.
