= Zir Anbar-e Zivdar =

Village in Lorestan province, Iran

Zir Anbar-e Zivdar Persian: زيرانبارزيودار
- Village
- Location within Iran
- Country: Iran
- Province: Lorestan
- County: Mamulan
- District: Central
- Rural District: Zivdar

Population (2016)
  - Total: 127
- Time zone: UTC+3:30 (IRST)

Zir Anbar-e Zivdar (Persian: زيرانبارزيودار) (Note: Also romanized as Zīr Anbār-e Zīvdār; also known as Zīr Anbār) is a village in Zivdar Rural District of the Central District (Note: Formerly Mamulan District of Pol-e Dokhtar County) in Mamulan County, Lorestan province, Iran.

== Demographics ==
=== Population ===
At the time of the 2006 National Census, the village's population was 134 in 28 households, when it was in Afrineh Rural District of Mamulan District (Note: Renamed the Central District of Mamulan County) in Pol-e Dokhtar County. The following census in 2011 counted 140 people in 33 households. The 2016 census measured the population of the village as 127 people in 38 households.

In 2023, the district was separated from the county in the establishment of Mamulan County and renamed the Central District. The rural district was transferred to the new Afrineh District, and Zir Anbar-e Zivdar was transferred to Zivdar Rural District created in the Central District.
