= Sarenjeh-ye Zivdar =

Village in Lorestan province, Iran

Sarenjeh-ye Zivdar Persian: سرنجه زيودار
- Village
- Location within Iran
- Coordinates: 33°19′35″N 47°47′19″E
- Country: Iran
- Province: Lorestan
- County: Mamulan
- District: Central
- Rural District: Zivdar

Population (2016)
  - Total: 565
- Time zone: UTC+3:30 (IRST)

Sarenjeh-ye Zivdar (Persian: سرنجه زيودار) (Note: Also romanized as Sarenjeh-ye Zīvdār; also known as Sarenjeh-ye Zeyvehdār, Sīrīnjeh, and Zeyvehdār) is a village in Zivdar Rural District of the Central District (Note: Formerly Mamulan District of Pol-e Dokhtar County) in Mamulan County, Lorestan province, Iran.

== Demographics ==
=== Population ===
At the time of the 2006 National Census, the village's population was 641 in 132 households, when it was in Afrineh Rural District of Mamulan District (Note: Renamed the Central District of Mamulan County) in Pol-e Dokhtar County. The following census in 2011 counted 599 people in 155 households. The 2016 census measured the population of the village as 565 people in 153 households.

In 2023, the district was separated from the county in the establishment of Mamulan County and renamed the Central District. The rural district was transferred to the new Afrineh District, and Sarenjeh-ye Zivdar was transferred to Zivdar Rural District created in the Central District.
