= Lit Bar-e Zivdar =

Village in Lorestan province, Iran

Lit Bar-e Zivdar Persian: ليت برزيودار
- Village
- Location within Iran
- Coordinates: 33°19′23″N 47°47′12″E
- Country: Iran
- Province: Lorestan
- County: Mamulan
- District: Central
- Rural District: Zivdar

Population (2016)
  - Total: 462
- Time zone: UTC+3:30 (IRST)

Lit Bar-e Zivdar (Persian: ليت برزيودار) (Note: Also romanized as Līt Bar-e Zīvdār) is a village in Zivdar Rural District of the Central District (Note: Formerly Mamulan District of Pol-e Dokhtar County) in Mamulan County, Lorestan province, Iran.

== Demographics ==
=== Population ===
At the time of the 2006 National Census, the village's population was 425 in 85 households, when it was in Afrineh Rural District of Mamulan District (Note: Renamed the Central District of Mamulan County) in Pol-e Dokhtar County. The following census in 2011 counted 470 people in 114 households. The 2016 census measured the population of the village as 462 people in 124 households.

In 2023, the district was separated from the county in the establishment of Mamulan County and renamed the Central District. The rural district was transferred to the new Afrineh District, and Lit Bar-e Zivdar was transferred to Zivdar Rural District created in the Central District.
