= Do Ab-e Zivdar =

Village in Lorestan province, Iran

Do Ab-e Zivdar Persian: دواب زيودار
- Village
- Location within Iran
- Country: Iran
- Province: Lorestan
- County: Mamulan
- District: Central
- Rural District: Zivdar

Population (2016)
  - Total: 106
- Time zone: UTC+3:30 (IRST)

Do Ab-e Zivdar (Persian: دواب زيودار) (Note: Also romanized as Do Āb-e Zīvdār, Dow Ab-e Zivdar, and Dow Āb-e Zīvdār; also known as Dow Āb) is a village in Zivdar Rural District of the Central District (Note: Formerly Mamulan District of Pol-e Dokhtar County) in Mamulan County, Lorestan province, Iran.

== Demographics ==
=== Population ===
At the time of the 2006 National Census, the village's population was 96 in 20 households, when it was in Afrineh Rural District of Mamulan District (Note: Renamed the Central District of Mamulan County) in Pol-e Dokhtar County. The following census in 2011 counted 101 people in 28 households. The 2016 census measured the population of the village as 106 people in 31 households.

In 2023, the district was separated from the county in the establishment of Mamulan County and renamed the Central District. The rural district was transferred to the new Afrineh District, and Do Ab-e Zivdar was transferred to Zivdar Rural District created in the Central District.
