= Bargalan Sukhteh =

Village in Lorestan province, Iran

Bargalan Sukhteh Persian: برگلان سوخته
- Village
- Location within Iran
- Coordinates: 33°19′20″N 47°50′37″E
- Country: Iran
- Province: Lorestan
- County: Mamulan
- District: Central
- Rural District: Zivdar

Population (2016)
  - Total: 213
- Time zone: UTC+3:30 (IRST)

Bargalan Sukhteh (Persian: برگلان سوخته) (Note: Also romanized as Bargalān Sūkhteh; also known as Bargalūn Sūkhteh) is a village in Zivdar Rural District of the Central District (Note: Formerly Mamulan District of Pol-e Dokhtar County) in Mamulan County, Lorestan province, Iran.

== Demographics ==
=== Population ===
At the time of the 2006 National Census, the village's population was 170 in 39 households, when it was in Afrineh Rural District of Mamulan District (Note: Renamed the Central District of Mamulan County) in Pol-e Dokhtar County. The following census in 2011 counted 184 people in 50 households. The 2016 census measured the population of the village as 213 people in 66 households.

In 2023, the district was separated from the county in the establishment of Mamulan County and renamed the Central District. The rural district was transferred to the new Afrineh District, and Bargalan Sukhteh was transferred to Zivdar Rural District created in the Central District.
