= Tarveh Morteza =

Village in Lorestan province, Iran

Tarveh Morteza Persian: تروه مرتضي
- Village
- Location within Iran
- Coordinates: 33°17′36″N 47°46′24″E
- Country: Iran
- Province: Lorestan
- County: Mamulan
- District: Central
- Rural District: Zivdar

Population (2016)
  - Total: 77
- Time zone: UTC+3:30 (IRST)

Tarveh Morteza (Persian: تروه مرتضي) (Note: Also romanized as Tarveh Maratzi, Tarveh Maratẕī, and Tarveh Morteẕá; also known as Tarveh) is a village in Zivdar Rural District of the Central District (Note: Formerly Mamulan District of Pol-e Dokhtar County) in Mamulan County, Lorestan province, Iran.

== Demographics ==
=== Population ===
At the time of the 2006 National Census, the village's population was 35 in eight households, when it was in Afrineh Rural District of Mamulan District (Note: Renamed the Central District of Mamulan County) in Pol-e Dokhtar County. The following census in 2011 counted a population below the reporting threshold. The 2016 census measured the population of the village as 77 people in 17 households.

In 2023, the district was separated from the county in the establishment of Mamulan County and renamed the Central District. The rural district was transferred to the new Afrineh District, and Tarveh Morteza was transferred to Zivdar Rural District created in the Central District.
