= Sarmar =

Village in Lorestan province, Iran

Sarmar Persian: سرمر
- Village
- Location within Iran
- Coordinates: 33°19′19″N 47°51′30″E
- Country: Iran
- Province: Lorestan
- County: Mamulan
- District: Central
- Rural District: Zivdar

Population (2016)
  - Total: 24
- Time zone: UTC+3:30 (IRST)

Sarmar (Persian: سرمر) is a village in Zivdar Rural District of the Central District (Note: Formerly Mamulan District of Pol-e Dokhtar County) in Mamulan County, Lorestan province, Iran.

== Demographics ==
=== Population ===
At the time of the 2006 National Census, the village's population was 25 in four households, when it was in Afrineh Rural District of Mamulan District (Note: Renamed the Central District of Mamulan County) in Pol-e Dokhtar County. The following census in 2011 counted 31 people in eight households. The 2016 census measured the population of the village as 24 people in seven households.

In 2023, the district was separated from the county in the establishment of Mamulan County and renamed the Central District. The rural district was transferred to the new Afrineh District, and Sarmar was transferred to Zivdar Rural District created in the Central District.
