= Zuran Tall =

Village in Lorestan province, Iran

Zuran Tall Persian: زورانتل
- Village
- Location within Iran
- Coordinates: 33°18′55″N 47°50′24″E
- Country: Iran
- Province: Lorestan
- County: Mamulan
- District: Central
- Rural District: Zivdar

Population (2016)
  - Total: 282
- Time zone: UTC+3:30 (IRST)

Zuran Tall (Persian: زوران تل) (Note: Also romanized as Zoorantel, Zūrān Tal, Zūrān Tall, and Zūrāntel) is a village in Zivdar Rural District of the Central District (Note: Formerly Mamulan District of Pol-e Dokhtar County) in Mamulan County, Lorestan province, Iran.

== Demographics ==
=== Population ===
At the time of the 2006 National Census, the village's population was 372 in 91 households, when it was in Afrineh Rural District of Mamulan District (Note: Renamed the Central District of Mamulan County) in Pol-e Dokhtar County. The following census in 2011 counted 347 people in 102 households. The 2016 census measured the population of the village as 347 people in 102 households.

In 2023, the district was separated from the county in the establishment of Mamulan County and renamed the Central District. The rural district was transferred to the new Afrineh District, and Zuran Tall was transferred to Zivdar Rural District created in the Central District.
