= Baraftab, Mamulan =

Village in Lorestan province, Iran

Baraftab Persian: برافتاب
- Village
- Location within Iran
- Country: Iran
- Province: Lorestan
- County: Mamulan
- District: Central
- Rural District: Zivdar

Population (2016)
  - Total: 36
- Time zone: UTC+3:30 (IRST)

Baraftab (Persian: برافتاب) (Note: Also romanized as Barāftāb) is a village in Zivdar Rural District of the Central District (Note: Formerly Mamulan District of Pol-e Dokhtar County) in Mamulan County, Lorestan province, Iran.

== Demographics ==
=== Population ===
At the time of the 2006 National Census, the village's population was 62 in 16 households, when it was in Afrineh Rural District of Mamulan District (Note: Renamed the Central District of Mamulan County) in Pol-e Dokhtar County. The following census in 2011 counted 42 people in 13 households. The 2016 census measured the population of the village as 36 people in 11 households.

In 2023, the district was separated from the county in the establishment of Mamulan County and renamed the Central District. The rural district was transferred to the new Afrineh District, and Baraftab was transferred to Zivdar Rural District created in the Central District.
