= Taq Rezaleh-ye Mohammad Aqa =

Village in Lorestan province, Iran

Taq Rezaleh-ye Mohammad Aqa Persian: طاق رزاله محمداقا
- Village
- Location within Iran
- Coordinates: 33°17′43″N 47°54′40″E
- Country: Iran
- Province: Lorestan
- County: Mamulan
- District: Afrineh
- Rural District: Afrineh

Population (2016)
  - Total: 94
- Time zone: UTC+3:30 (IRST)

Taq Rezaleh-ye Mohammad Aqa (Persian: طاق رزاله محمداقا) (Note: Also romanized as Ţāq Rezāleh-ye Moḩammad Āqā; also known as Ţāq-e Reẕāleh and Ţāq-e Reẕālī) is a village in Afrineh Rural District of Afrineh District in Mamulan County, Lorestan province, Iran.

== Demographics ==
=== Population ===
At the time of the 2006 National Census, the village's population was 130 in 21 households, when it was in Mamulan District (Note: Renamed the Central District of Mamulan County) of Pol-e Dokhtar County. The following census in 2011 counted 95 people in 17 households. The 2016 census measured the population of the village as 94 people in 30 households.

In 2023, the district was separated from the county in the establishment of Mamulan County and renamed the Central District. The rural district was transferred to the new Afrineh District.
