= Dul Gaz-e Rajabali =

Village in Lorestan province, Iran

Dul Gaz-e Rajabali Persian: دولگزرجبعلي
- Village
- Location within Iran
- Coordinates: 33°12′39″N 48°04′36″E
- Country: Iran
- Province: Lorestan
- County: Mamulan
- District: Afrineh
- Rural District: Afrineh

Population (2016)
  - Total: 172
- Time zone: UTC+3:30 (IRST)

Dul Gaz-e Rajabali (Persian: دولگزرجبعلي) (Note: Also romanized as Dūl Gaz-e Rajab‘alī) is a village in Afrineh Rural District of Afrineh District in Mamulan County, Lorestan province, Iran.

== Demographics ==
=== Population ===
At the time of the 2006 National Census, the village's population was 187 in 38 households, when it was in Miyankuh-e Sharqi Rural District of Mamulan District (Note: Renamed the Central District in Mamulan County) in Pol-e Dokhtar County. The following census in 2011 counted 148 people in 33 households. The 2016 census measured the population of the village as 172 people in 47 households.

In 2023, the district was separated from the county in the establishment of Mamulan County and renamed the Central District. The rural district was transferred to the new Afrineh District, and Dul Gaz-e Rajabali was transferred to Afrineh Rural District in the same district.
