= Kapargah-e Alireza =

Village in Lorestan province, Iran

Kapargah-e Alireza Persian: كپرگه عليرضا
- Village
- Location within Iran
- Coordinates: 33°12′51″N 48°05′08″E
- Country: Iran
- Province: Lorestan
- County: Mamulan
- District: Afrineh
- Rural District: Afrineh

Population (2016)
  - Total: 38
- Time zone: UTC+3:30 (IRST)

Kapargah-e Alireza (Persian: كپرگه عليرضا) (Note: Also romanized as Kapargah-e ‘Alīreẕā) is a village in Afrineh Rural District of Afrineh District in Mamulan County, Lorestan province, Iran.

== Demographics ==
=== Population ===
At the time of the 2006 National Census, the village's population was 47 in nine households, when it was in Miyankuh-e Sharqi Rural District of Mamulan District (Note: Renamed the Central District in Mamulan County) in Pol-e Dokhtar County. The following census in 2011 counted 21 people in five households. The 2016 census measured the population of the village as 38 people in 11 households.

In 2023, the district was separated from the county in the establishment of Mamulan County and renamed the Central District. The rural district was transferred to the new Afrineh District, and Kapargah-e Alireza was transferred to Afrineh Rural District in the same district.
