= Bakhshivand =

Village in Lorestan province, Iran

Bakhshivand Persian: بخشيوند
- Village
- Country: Iran
- Province: Lorestan
- County: Mamulan
- District: Afrineh
- Rural District: Afrineh

Population (2016)
  - Total: 114
- Time zone: UTC+3:30 (IRST)

Bakhshivand (Persian: بخشيوند) (Note: Also romanized as Bakshīvand; formerly known as Bakhshi Varz (بخشي ورز), also romanized as Bakshī Varz) is a village in Afrineh Rural District of Afrineh District in Mamulan County, Lorestan province, Iran.

== Demographics ==
=== Population ===
At the time of the 2006 National Census, the village's population, as Bakhshi Varz, was 69 in 15 households, when it was in Mamulan District (Note: Renamed the Central District of Mamulan County) of Pol-e Dokhtar County. The following census in 2011 counted 42 people in nine households. The 2016 census measured the population of the village as 114 people in 24 households, by which time the village was listed as Bakhshivand.

In 2023, the district was separated from the county in the establishment of Mamulan County and renamed the Central District. The rural district was transferred to the new Afrineh District.
