= Sar Takht-e Qadam Kheyr =

Village in Lorestan province, Iran

Sar Takht-e Qadam Kheyr Persian: سرتخت قدم خير
- Village
- Location within Iran
- Coordinates: 33°18′11″N 47°54′53″E
- Country: Iran
- Province: Lorestan
- County: Mamulan
- District: Afrineh
- Rural District: Afrineh

Population (2016)
  - Total: Below reporting threshold
- Time zone: UTC+3:30 (IRST)

Sar Takht-e Qadam Kheyr (Persian: سرتخت قدم خير) (Note: Also romanized as Sartakht-e Qadam Kheyr) is a village in Afrineh Rural District of Afrineh District in Mamulan County, Lorestan province, Iran.

== Demographics ==
=== Population ===
At the time of the 2006 National Census, the village's population was 34 in five households, when it was in Mamulan District (Note: Renamed the Central District of Mamulan County) of Pol-e Dokhtar County. The following censuses in 2011 and 2016 counted a population below the reporting threshold.

In 2023, the district was separated from the county in the establishment of Mamulan County and renamed the Central District. The rural district was transferred to the new Afrineh District.
