= Domrud-e Amir-e Pain =

Village in Lorestan province, Iran

Domrud-e Amir-e Pain Persian: دمرود امير پايين
- Village
- Location within Iran
- Country: Iran
- Province: Lorestan
- County: Mamulan
- District: Central
- Rural District: Zivdar

Population (2016)
  - Total: 78
- Time zone: UTC+3:30 (IRST)

Domrud-e Amir-e Pain (Persian: دمرود امير پايين) (Note: Also romanized as Domrūd-e Amīr-e Pā’īn; formerly known as Domrud-e Amir-e Sofla (دمروداميرسفلي), also romanized as Domrūd-e Amīr-e Soflá) is a village in Zivdar Rural District of the Central District (Note: Formerly Mamulan District of Pol-e Dokhtar County) in Mamulan County, Lorestan province, Iran.

== Demographics ==
=== Population ===
At the time of the 2006 National Census, the village's population, as Domrud-e Amir-e Sofla, was 219 in 43 households, when it was in Afrineh Rural District of Mamulan District (Note: Renamed the Central District of Mamulan County) in Pol-e Dokhtar County. The following census in 2011 counted 55 people in 14 households, by which time the village was listed as Domrud-e Amir-e Pain. The 2016 census measured the population of the village as 78 people in 25 households.

In 2023, the district was separated from the county in the establishment of Mamulan County and renamed the Central District. The rural district was transferred to the new Afrineh District, and Domrud-e Amir-e Pain was transferred to Zivdar Rural District created in the Central District.
