= Bagh-e Bisheh =

Village in Lorestan province, Iran

Bagh-e Bisheh Persian: باغ بيشه
- Village
- Location within Iran
- Country: Iran
- Province: Lorestan
- County: Mamulan
- District: Afrineh
- Rural District: Afrineh

Population (2016)
  - Total: 24
- Time zone: UTC+3:30 (IRST)

Bagh-e Bisheh (Persian: باغ بيشه) (Note: Also romanized as Bagh Bisheh, Bāgh Bīsheh, and Bāgh-e Bīsheh; also known as Bāgh Pīshī (باغ پيش)) is a village in Afrineh Rural District of Afrineh District in Mamulan County, Lorestan province, Iran.

== Demographics ==
=== Population ===
At the time of the 2006 National Census, the village's population was 25 in five households, when it was in Miyankuh-e Sharqi Rural District of Mamulan District (Note: Renamed the Central District in Mamulan County) in Pol-e Dokhtar County. The following census in 2011 counted 30 people in eight households. The 2016 census measured the population of the village as 24 people in seven households.

In 2023, the district was separated from the county in the establishment of Mamulan County and renamed the Central District. The rural district was transferred to the new Afrineh District, and Bagh-e Bisheh was transferred to Afrineh Rural District in the same district.
