= Dardamel-e Hoseynali =

Village in Lorestan province, Iran

Dardamel-e Hoseynali Persian: داردمل حسينعلي
- Village
- Location within Iran
- Country: Iran
- Province: Lorestan
- County: Mamulan
- District: Afrineh
- Rural District: Afrineh

Population (2016)
  - Total: 22
- Time zone: UTC+3:30 (IRST)

Dardamel-e Hoseynali (Persian: داردمل حسينعلي) (Note: Also romanized as Dārdamel-e Ḩoseyn‘alī) is a village in Afrineh Rural District of Afrineh District in Mamulan County, Lorestan province, Iran.

== Demographics ==
=== Population ===
At the time of the 2006 National Census, the village's population was 36 in six households, when it was in Mamulan District (Note: Renamed the Central District of Mamulan County) of Pol-e Dokhtar County. The following census in 2011 counted 25 people in six households. The 2016 census measured the population of the village as 22 people in five households.

In 2023, the district was separated from the county in the establishment of Mamulan County and renamed the Central District. The rural district was transferred to the new Afrineh District.
