= Nuzi Shahsavarvand =

Village in Lorestan province, Iran

Nuzi Shahsavarvand Persian: نوزي شهسواروند
- Village
- Location within Iran
- Coordinates: 33°15′01″N 47°56′21″E
- Country: Iran
- Province: Lorestan
- County: Mamulan
- District: Afrineh
- Rural District: Afrineh

Population (2016)
  - Total: 68
- Time zone: UTC+3:30 (IRST)

Nuzi Shahsavarvand (Persian: نوزي شهسواروند) (Note: Also romanized as Nūzī Shahsavārvand) is a village in Afrineh Rural District of Afrineh District in Mamulan County, Lorestan province, Iran.

== Demographics ==
=== Population ===
At the time of the 2006 National Census, the village's population was 91 in 20 households, when it was in Mamulan District (Note: Renamed the Central District of Mamulan County) of Pol-e Dokhtar County. The following census in 2011 counted 62 people in 15 households. The 2016 census measured the population of the village as 68 people in 18 households.

In 2023, the district was separated from the county in the establishment of Mamulan County and renamed the Central District. The rural district was transferred to the new Afrineh District.
