= Bon Abbas Gol Bag Mir =

Village in Lorestan province, Iran

Bon Abbas Gol Bag Mir Persian: بن عباس گل بگ مير
- Village
- Country: Iran
- Province: Lorestan
- County: Mamulan
- District: Afrineh
- Rural District: Afrineh

Population (2016)
  - Total: Below reporting threshold
- Time zone: UTC+3:30 (IRST)

Bon Abbas Gol Bag Mir (Persian: بن عباس گل بگ مير) (Note: Also romanized as Bon ‘Abbās Gol Bag Mīr; also known as Gol Bag Mīr (گل بگ مير)) is a village in Afrineh Rural District of Afrineh District in Mamulan County, Lorestan province, Iran.

== Demographics ==
=== Population ===
At the time of the 2006 National Census, the village's population was 27 in six households, when it was in Mamulan District (Note: Renamed the Central District of Mamulan County) of Pol-e Dokhtar County. The 2016 census measured the population of the village as zero.

In 2023, the district was separated from the county in the establishment of Mamulan County and renamed the Central District. The rural district was transferred to the new Afrineh District.
