= Cheshmeh Sorkheh Seyyed Reza =

Village in Lorestan province, Iran

Cheshmeh Sorkheh Seyyed Reza Persian: چشمه سرخه صيدرضا
- Village
- Country: Iran
- Province: Lorestan
- County: Mamulan
- District: Afrineh
- Rural District: Afrineh

Population (2016)
  - Total: 19
- Time zone: UTC+3:30 (IRST)

Cheshmeh Sorkheh Seyyed Reza (Persian: چشمه سرخه صيدرضا) (Note: Also romanized as Cheshmeh Sorkheh Seyyed Rez̤ā) is a village in Afrineh Rural District of Afrineh District in Mamulan County, Lorestan province, Iran.

== Demographics ==
=== Population ===
At the time of the 2006 National Census, the village's population was 97 in 27 households, when it was in Mamulan District (Note: Renamed the Central District of Mamulan County) of Pol-e Dokhtar County. The following census in 2011 counted 29 people in six households. The 2016 census measured the population of the village as 19 people in four households.

In 2023, the district was separated from the county in the establishment of Mamulan County and renamed the Central District. The rural district was transferred to the new Afrineh District.
