= Dar Aghol Begir-e Latif =

Village in Lorestan province, Iran

Dar Aghol Begir-e Latif Persian: دراغل بگيرلطيف
- Village
- Location within Iran
- Coordinates: 33°18′27″N 47°53′23″E
- Country: Iran
- Province: Lorestan
- County: Mamulan
- District: Afrineh
- Rural District: Afrineh

Population (2016)
  - Total: 110
- Time zone: UTC+3:30 (IRST)

Dar Aghol Begir-e Latif (Persian: دراغل بگيرلطيف) (Note: Also romanized as Dar Āghol Begīr-e Laţīf) is a village in Afrineh Rural District of Afrineh District in Mamulan County, Lorestan province, Iran.

== Demographics ==
=== Population ===
At the time of the 2006 National Census, the village's population was 93 in 15 households, when it was in Mamulan District (Note: Renamed the Central District of Mamulan County) of Pol-e Dokhtar County. The following census in 2011 counted 84 people in 17 households. The 2016 census measured the population of the village as 110 people in 24 households.

In 2023, the district was separated from the county in the establishment of Mamulan County and renamed the Central District. The rural district was transferred to the new Afrineh District.
