= Kapargah-e Aqa Hoseyn =

Village in Lorestan province, Iran

Kapargah-e Aqa Hoseyn Persian: كپرگه اقاحسين
- Village
- Location within Iran
- Coordinates: 33°12′51″N 48°04′53″E
- Country: Iran
- Province: Lorestan
- County: Mamulan
- District: Afrineh
- Rural District: Afrineh

Population (2016)
  - Total: 92
- Time zone: UTC+3:30 (IRST)

Kapargah-e Aqa Hoseyn (Persian: كپرگه اقاحسين) (Note: Also romanized as Kapargāh-e Āqā Ḩoseyn) is a village in Afrineh Rural District of Afrineh District in Mamulan County, Lorestan province, Iran.

== Demographics ==
=== Population ===
At the time of the 2006 National Census, the village's population was 122 in 24 households, when it was in Miyankuh-e Sharqi Rural District of Mamulan District (Note: Renamed the Central District in Mamulan County) in Pol-e Dokhtar County. The following census in 2011 counted 132 people in 26 households. The 2016 census measured the population of the village as 92 people in 31 households.

In 2023, the district was separated from the county in the establishment of Mamulan County and renamed the Central District. The rural district was transferred to the new Afrineh District, and Kapargah-e Aqa Hoseyn was transferred to Afrineh Rural District in the same district.
