= Dadagolab =

Village in Lorestan province, Iran

Dadagolab Persian: داداگلاب
- Village
- Location within Iran
- Coordinates: 33°08′31″N 48°05′26″E
- Country: Iran
- Province: Lorestan
- County: Mamulan
- District: Afrineh
- Rural District: Afrineh

Population (2016)
  - Total: 122
- Time zone: UTC+3:30 (IRST)

Dadagolab (Persian: داداگلاب) (Note: Also romanized as Dādāgolāb) is a village in Afrineh Rural District of Afrineh District in Mamulan County, Lorestan province, Iran.

== Demographics ==
=== Population ===
At the time of the 2006 National Census, the village's population was 95 in 23 households, when it was in Miyankuh-e Sharqi Rural District of Mamulan District (Note: Renamed the Central District in Mamulan County) in Pol-e Dokhtar County. The following census in 2011 counted 113 people in 29 households. The 2016 census measured the population of the village as 122 people in 33 households.

In 2023, the district was separated from the county in the establishment of Mamulan County and renamed the Central District. The rural district was transferred to the new Afrineh District, and Dadagolab was transferred to Afrineh Rural District in the same district.
