= Nur Alivan Kar =

Village in Lorestan province, Iran

Nur Alivan Kar Persian: نورعلي ونکار
- Village
- Location within Iran
- Country: Iran
- Province: Lorestan
- County: Mamulan
- District: Afrineh
- Rural District: Afrineh

Population (2016)
  - Total: 28
- Time zone: UTC+3:30 (IRST)

Nur Alivan Kar (Persian: نورعلي ونکار) (Note: Also romanized as Nūr ‘Alīvan Kār; also known as Nur Alivand Kar, Nūr ‘Alīvand Kār, and Nūr ‘Alīvand Kār-e ‘Abd ol Ḩoseyn) is a village in Afrineh Rural District of Afrineh District in Mamulan County, Lorestan province, Iran.

== Demographics ==
=== Population ===
At the time of the 2006 National Census, the village's population was 45 in seven households, when it was in Mamulan District (Note: Renamed the Central District of Mamulan County) of Pol-e Dokhtar County. The following census in 2011 counted 28 people in four households. The 2016 census measured the population of the village as 28 people in six households.

In 2023, the district was separated from the county in the establishment of Mamulan County and renamed the Central District. The rural district was transferred to the new Afrineh District.
