= Asad Koshteh =

Village in Lorestan province, Iran

Asad Koshteh Persian: اسد کشته
- Village
- Location within Iran
- Coordinates: 33°14′04″N 48°00′20″E
- Country: Iran
- Province: Lorestan
- County: Mamulan
- District: Afrineh
- Rural District: Afrineh

Population (2016)
  - Total: 15
- Time zone: UTC+3:30 (IRST)

Asad Koshteh (Persian: اسد کشته) (Note: Also romanized as Āsad Koshteh) is a village in Afrineh Rural District of Afrineh District in Mamulan County, Lorestan province, Iran.

== Demographics ==
=== Population ===
At the time of the 2006 National Census, the village's population was 34 in seven households, when it was in Mamulan District (Note: Renamed the Central District of Mamulan County) of Pol-e Dokhtar County. The following census in 2011 counted 27 people in six households. The 2016 census measured the population of the village as 15 people in four households.

In 2023, the district was separated from the county in the establishment of Mamulan County and renamed the Central District. The rural district was transferred to the new Afrineh District.
