= Papi Ahmad =

Village in Lorestan province, Iran

Papi Ahmad Persian: پاپي احمد
- Village
- Country: Iran
- Province: Lorestan
- County: Mamulan
- District: Afrineh
- Rural District: Afrineh

Population (2016)
  - Total: 24
- Time zone: UTC+3:30 (IRST)

Papi Ahmad (Persian: پاپي احمد) (Note: Also romanized as Pāpī Āḥmad) is a village in Afrineh Rural District of Afrineh District in Mamulan County, Lorestan province, Iran.

== Demographics ==
=== Population ===
At the time of the 2006 National Census, the village's population was 15 in four households, when it was in Mamulan District (Note: Renamed the Central District of Mamulan County) of Pol-e Dokhtar County. The following census in 2011 counted 24 people in six households. The 2016 census measured the population of the village as 24 people in six households.

In 2023, the district was separated from the county in the establishment of Mamulan County and renamed the Central District. The rural district was transferred to the new Afrineh District.
