= Alishah, Lorestan =

Village in Lorestan province, Iran

Alishah Persian: عليشاه
- Village
- Location within Iran
- Country: Iran
- Province: Lorestan
- County: Mamulan
- District: Afrineh
- Rural District: Afrineh

Population (2016)
  - Total: 29
- Time zone: UTC+3:30 (IRST)

Alishah (Persian: عليشاه) (Note: Also romanized as ʿAlīshāh) is a village in Afrineh Rural District of Afrineh District in Mamulan County, Lorestan province, Iran.

== Demographics ==
=== Population ===
At the time of the 2006 National Census, the village's population was 74 in 15 households, when it was in Miyankuh-e Sharqi Rural District of Mamulan District (Note: Renamed the Central District in Mamulan County) in Pol-e Dokhtar County. The following census in 2011 counted 69 people in 18 households. The 2016 census measured the population of the village as 29 people in six households.

In 2023, the district was separated from the county in the establishment of Mamulan County and renamed the Central District. The rural district was transferred to the new Afrineh District, and Alishah was transferred to Afrineh Rural District in the same district.
