= Vareh Zardi, Mamulan =

Village in Lorestan province, Iran

Vareh Zardi Persian: وره زردي
- Village
- Location within Iran
- Coordinates: 33°13′54″N 48°01′46″E
- Country: Iran
- Province: Lorestan
- County: Mamulan
- District: Afrineh
- Rural District: Afrineh

Population (2016)
  - Total: 252
- Time zone: UTC+3:30 (IRST)

Vareh Zardi (Persian: وره زردي) (Note: Also romanized as Vareh Zardī; also known as Varāzard) is a village in Afrineh Rural District of Afrineh District in Mamulan County, Lorestan province, Iran.

== Demographics ==
=== Population ===
At the time of the 2006 National Census, the village's population was 258 in 53 households, when it was in Miyankuh-e Sharqi Rural District of Mamulan District (Note: Renamed the Central District in Mamulan County) in Pol-e Dokhtar County. The following census in 2011 counted 206 people in 50 households. The 2016 census measured the population of the village as 252 people in 69 households.

In 2023, the district was separated from the county in the establishment of Mamulan County and renamed the Central District. The rural district was transferred to the new Afrineh District, and Vareh Zardi was transferred to Afrineh Rural District in the same district.
