= Pol-e Eshkeneh =

Village in Lorestan province, Iran

Pol-e Eshkeneh Persian: پل اشكنه
- Village
- Location within Iran
- Coordinates: 33°13′18″N 48°06′34″E
- Country: Iran
- Province: Lorestan
- County: Mamulan
- District: Afrineh
- Rural District: Afrineh

Population (2016)
  - Total: 186
- Time zone: UTC+3:30 (IRST)

Pol-e Eshkeneh (Persian: پل اشكنه) (Note: Also romanized as Pol Eshkeneh and Poleshkeneh) is a village in Afrineh Rural District of Afrineh District in Mamulan County, Lorestan province, Iran.

== Demographics ==
=== Population ===
At the time of the 2006 National Census, the village's population was 146 in 29 households, when it was in Miyankuh-e Sharqi Rural District of Mamulan District (Note: Renamed the Central District in Mamulan County) in Pol-e Dokhtar County. The following census in 2011 counted 125 people in 27 households. The 2016 census measured the population of the village as 186 people in 51 households.

In 2023, the district was separated from the county in the establishment of Mamulan County and renamed the Central District. The rural district was transferred to the new Afrineh District, and Pol-e Eshkeneh was transferred to Afrineh Rural District in the same district.
