= Sarab-e Abd ol Ali =

Village in Lorestan province, Iran

Sarab-e Abd ol Ali Persian: سراب عبدالعلي
- Village
- Location within Iran
- Coordinates: 33°08′27″N 48°07′06″E
- Country: Iran
- Province: Lorestan
- County: Mamulan
- District: Afrineh
- Rural District: Afrineh

Population (2016)
  - Total: 332
- Time zone: UTC+3:30 (IRST)

Sarab-e Abd ol Ali (Persian: سراب عبدالعلي) (Note: Also romanized as Sarāb-e ‘Abd ol ‘Alī; also known as Āb Sard-e Sarāb and Sarāb-e Abdālī) also known as Khalilabad (خليل آباد) is a village in Afrineh Rural District of Afrineh District in Mamulan County, Lorestan province, Iran.

== Demographics ==
=== Population ===
At the time of the 2006 National Census, the village's population was 317 in 70 households, when it was in Miyankuh-e Sharqi Rural District of Mamulan District (Note: Renamed the Central District in Mamulan County) in Pol-e Dokhtar County. The following census in 2011 counted 320 people in 83 households. The 2016 census measured the population of the village as 332 people in 87 households.

In 2023, the district was separated from the county in the establishment of Mamulan County and renamed the Central District. The rural district was transferred to the new Afrineh District, and Sarab-e Abd ol Ali was transferred to Afrineh Rural District in the same district.
