= Mehdi Khan, Lorestan =

Village in Lorestan province, Iran

Mehdi Khan Persian: مهدي خان
- Village
- Location within Iran
- Country: Iran
- Province: Lorestan
- County: Mamulan
- District: Afrineh
- Rural District: Afrineh

Population (2016)
  - Total: 52
- Time zone: UTC+3:30 (IRST)

Mehdi Khan (Persian: مهدي خان) (Note: Also romanized as Mahdi Khan, Mahdī Khān, Mahdīkhān, and Mehdī Khān) is a village in Afrineh Rural District of Afrineh District in Mamulan County, Lorestan province, Iran.

== Demographics ==
=== Population ===
At the time of the 2006 National Census, the village's population was 79 in 18 households, when it was in Miyankuh-e Sharqi Rural District of Mamulan District (Note: Renamed the Central District in Mamulan County) in Pol-e Dokhtar County. The following census in 2011 counted 81 people in 21 households. The 2016 census measured the population of the village as 52 people in 15 households.

In 2023, the district was separated from the county in the establishment of Mamulan County and renamed the Central District. The rural district was transferred to the new Afrineh District, and Mehdi Khan was transferred to Afrineh Rural District in the same district.
