= Bon Abbas-e Mehdi =

Village in Lorestan province, Iran

Bon Abbas-e Mehdi Persian: بن عباس مهدي
- Village
- Location within Iran
- Coordinates: 33°21′30″N 48°00′07″E
- Country: Iran
- Province: Lorestan
- County: Mamulan
- District: Afrineh
- Rural District: Afrineh

Population (2016)
  - Total: Below reporting threshold
- Time zone: UTC+3:30 (IRST)

Bon Abbas-e Mehdi (Persian: بن عباس مهدي) (Note: Also romanized as Bon ‘Abbās-e Mehdī; formerly known as Bon Abbas (بن عباس), also romanized as Bon ‘Abbās; also known as Bon ‘Abbās-e Laţīf) is a village in Afrineh Rural District of Afrineh District in Mamulan County, Lorestan province, Iran.

== Demographics ==
=== Population ===
At the time of the 2006 National Census, the village's population, as Bon Abbas, was 55 in 12 households, when it was in Mamulan District (Note: Renamed the Central District of Mamulan County) of Pol-e Dokhtar County. The following censuses in 2011 and 2016 counted a population below the reporting threshold, by which time the village was listed as Bon Abbas-e Mehdi.

In 2023, the district was separated from the county in the establishment of Mamulan County and renamed the Central District. The rural district was transferred to the new Afrineh District.
