= Posht Tang-e Kordali =

Village in Lorestan province, Iran

Posht Tang-e Kordali Persian: پشت تنگ كردعلي
- Village
- Location within Iran
- Country: Iran
- Province: Lorestan
- County: Mamulan
- District: Afrineh
- Rural District: Afrineh

Population (2016)
  - Total: 58
- Time zone: UTC+3:30 (IRST)

Posht Tang-e Kordali (Persian: پشت تنگ كردعلي) (Note: Also romanized as Posht Tang-e Kord‘alī; also known as Posht Tang and Qarīyeh-ye Posht Tang) is a village in Afrineh Rural District of Afrineh District in Mamulan County, Lorestan province, Iran.

== Demographics ==
=== Population ===
At the time of the 2006 National Census, the village's population was 60 in 14 households, when it was in Miyankuh-e Sharqi Rural District of Mamulan District (Note: Renamed the Central District in Mamulan County) in Pol-e Dokhtar County. The following census in 2011 counted 65 people in 19 households. The 2016 census measured the population of the village as 58 people in 18 households.

In 2023, the district was separated from the county in the establishment of Mamulan County and renamed the Central District. The rural district was transferred to the new Afrineh District, and Posht Tang-e Kordali was transferred to Afrineh Rural District in the same district.
