= Kahzadvand =

Village in Lorestan province, Iran

Kahzadvand Persian: كهزادوند
- Village
- Location within Iran
- Coordinates: 33°10′19″N 48°08′20″E
- Country: Iran
- Province: Lorestan
- County: Mamulan
- District: Afrineh
- Rural District: Afrineh

Population (2016)
  - Total: 26
- Time zone: UTC+3:30 (IRST)

Kahzadvand (Persian: كهزادوند) (Note: Also romanized as Kahzādvand) is a village in Afrineh Rural District of Afrineh District in Mamulan County, Lorestan province, Iran.

== Demographics ==
=== Population ===
At the time of the 2006 National Census, the village's population was 26 in five households, when it was in Miyankuh-e Sharqi Rural District of Mamulan District (Note: Renamed the Central District in Mamulan County) in Pol-e Dokhtar County. The following census in 2011 counted 27 people in seven households. The 2016 census measured the population of the village as 26 people in five households.

In 2023, the district was separated from the county in the establishment of Mamulan County and renamed the Central District. The rural district was transferred to the new Afrineh District, and Kahzadvand was transferred to Afrineh Rural District in the same district.
