= Bar Aftab-e Ghazal =

Village in Lorestan province, Iran

Bar Aftab-e Ghazal Persian: برافتاب غزال
- Village
- Location within Iran
- Coordinates: 33°13′15″N 48°06′12″E
- Country: Iran
- Province: Lorestan
- County: Mamulan
- District: Afrineh
- Rural District: Afrineh

Population (2016)
  - Total: 78
- Time zone: UTC+3:30 (IRST)

Bar Aftab-e Ghazal (Persian: برافتاب غزال) (Note: Also romanized as Bar Āftāb-e Ghazāl; also known as Bakhshvand-e Barāftāb) is a village in Afrineh Rural District of Afrineh District in Mamulan County, Lorestan province, Iran.

== Demographics ==
=== Population ===
At the time of the 2006 National Census, the village's population was 40 in seven households, when it was in Miyankuh-e Sharqi Rural District of Mamulan District (Note: Renamed the Central District in Mamulan County) in Pol-e Dokhtar County. The following census in 2011 counted 33 people in seven households. The 2016 census measured the population of the village as 78 people in 17 households.

In 2023, the district was separated from the county in the establishment of Mamulan County and renamed the Central District. The rural district was transferred to the new Afrineh District, and Bar Aftab-e Ghazal was transferred to Afrineh Rural District in the same district.
