= Qaleh Nasir, Lorestan =

Village in Lorestan province, Iran

Qaleh Nasir Persian: قلعه نصير
- Village
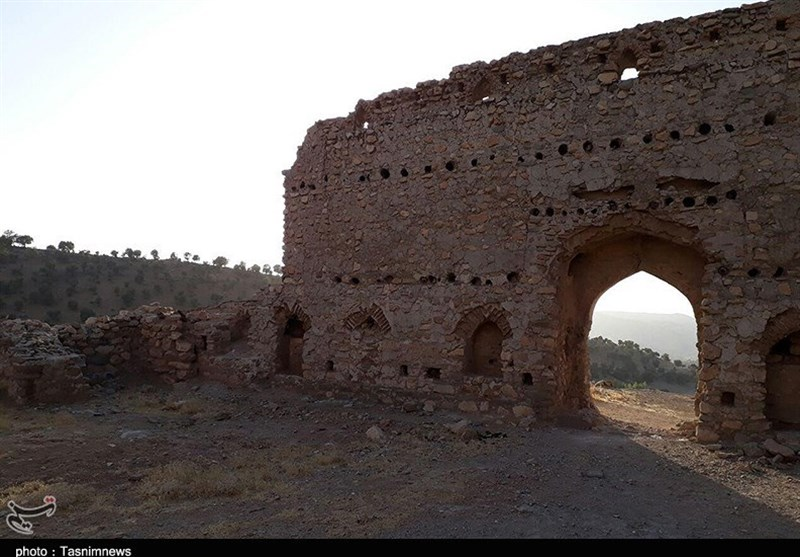
- Caravanserai in the village of Qaleh Nasir

- Location within Iran
- Coordinates: 33°11′07″N 48°08′12″E
- Country: Iran
- Province: Lorestan
- County: Mamulan
- District: Afrineh
- Rural District: Afrineh

Population (2016)
  - Total: 384
- Time zone: UTC+3:30 (IRST)

Qaleh Nasir (Persian: قلعه نصير) (Note: Also romanized as Qal‘eh Naşīr, Qal‘eh Nasīr, and Qal‘eh-ye Naşīr; also known as Shahīd Rajā’ī) is a village in Afrineh Rural District of Afrineh District in Mamulan County, Lorestan province, Iran.

== Demographics ==
=== Population ===
At the time of the 2006 National Census, the village's population was 471 in 102 households, when it was in Miyankuh-e Sharqi Rural District of Mamulan District (Note: Renamed the Central District in Mamulan County) in Pol-e Dokhtar County. The following census in 2011 counted 449 people in 111 households. The 2016 census measured the population of the village as 384 people in 97 households, the most populous in its rural district.

In 2023, the district was separated from the county in the establishment of Mamulan County and renamed the Central District. The rural district was transferred to the new Afrineh District, and Qaleh Nasir was transferred to Afrineh Rural District in the same district.
