= Gach Keykhah =

Village in Lorestan province, Iran

Gach Keykhah Persian: گچ كيخواه
- Village
- Location within Iran
- Country: Iran
- Province: Lorestan
- County: Mamulan
- District: Afrineh
- Rural District: Afrineh

Population (2016)
  - Total: Below reporting threshold
- Time zone: UTC+3:30 (IRST)

Gach Keykhvah (Persian: گچ كيخواه) (Note: Also romanized as Gach Keykhvāh) is a village in Afrineh Rural District of Afrineh District in Mamulan County, Lorestan province, Iran.

== Demographics ==
=== Population ===
At the time of the 2006 National Census, the village's population was 24 in four households, when it was in Miyankuh-e Sharqi Rural District of Mamulan District (Note: Renamed the Central District in Mamulan County) in Pol-e Dokhtar County. The following censuses in 2011 and 2016 counted a population below the reporting threshold.

In 2023, the district was separated from the county in the establishment of Mamulan County and renamed the Central District. The rural district was transferred to the new Afrineh District, and Gach Keykhah was transferred to Afrineh Rural District in the same district.
