= Khalil Akbar =

Village in Lorestan province, Iran

Khalil Akbar Persian: خليل اكبر
- Village
- Location within Iran
- Coordinates: 33°10′15″N 48°08′49″E
- Country: Iran
- Province: Lorestan
- County: Mamulan
- District: Afrineh
- Rural District: Afrineh

Population (2016)
  - Total: 230
- Time zone: UTC+3:30 (IRST)

Khalil Akbar (Persian: خليل اكبر) (Note: Also romanized as Khalīl Akbar; also known as Khalilabad (خليل آباد)) is a village in Afrineh Rural District of Afrineh District in Mamulan County, Lorestan province, Iran.

== Demographics ==
=== Population ===
At the time of the 2006 National Census, the village's population was 329 in 62 households, when it was in Miyankuh-e Sharqi Rural District of Mamulan District (Note: Renamed the Central District in Mamulan County) in Pol-e Dokhtar County. The following census in 2011 counted 237 people in 61 households. The 2016 census measured the population of the village as 230 people in 61 households.

In 2023, the district was separated from the county in the establishment of Mamulan County and renamed the Central District. The rural district was transferred to the new Afrineh District, and Khalil Akbar was transferred to Afrineh Rural District in the same district.
