= Cham-e Heydar, Zivdar =

Village in Lorestan province, Iran

Cham-e Heydar Persian: چم حيدر
- Village
- Location within Iran
- Country: Iran
- Province: Lorestan
- County: Mamulan
- District: Central
- Rural District: Zivdar

Population (2016)
  - Total: 44
- Time zone: UTC+3:30 (IRST)

Cham-e Heydar (Persian: چم حيدر) (Note: Also romanized as Cham-e Ḩeydar; also known as Qal‘eh-ye Cham-e Ḩeyda) is a village in Zivdar Rural District of the Central District (Note: Formerly Mamulan District of Pol-e Dokhtar County) in Mamulan County, Lorestan province, Iran.

== Demographics ==
=== Population ===
At the time of the 2006 National Census, the village's population was 75 in 16 households, when it was in Afrineh Rural District of Mamulan District (Note: Renamed the Central District of Mamulan County) in Pol-e Dokhtar County. The following census in 2011 counted 44 people in 10 households. The 2016 census measured the population of the village as 44 people in 11 households.

In 2023, the district was separated from the county in the establishment of Mamulan County and renamed the Central District. The rural district was transferred to the new Afrineh District, and Cham-e Heydar was transferred to Zivdar Rural District created in the Central District.
