= Anarrud-e Bozorg =

Village in Lorestan province, Iran

Anarrud-e Bozorg Persian: اناررودبزرگ
- Village
- Location within Iran
- Country: Iran
- Province: Lorestan
- County: Mamulan
- District: Afrineh
- Rural District: Afrineh

Population (2016)
  - Total: 51
- Time zone: UTC+3:30 (IRST)

Anarrud-e Bozorg (Persian: اناررودبزرگ) (Note: Also romanized as Anārrūd-e Bozorg; also known as Anār Rūd and Anārūd) is a village in Afrineh Rural District of Afrineh District in Mamulan County, Lorestan province, Iran.

== Demographics ==
=== Population ===
At the time of the 2006 National Census, the village's population was 126 in 23 households, when it was in Miyankuh-e Sharqi Rural District of Mamulan District (Note: Renamed the Central District in Mamulan County) in Pol-e Dokhtar County. The following census in 2011 counted 50 people in 11 households. The 2016 census measured the population of the village as 51 people in 11 households.

In 2023, the district was separated from the county in the establishment of Mamulan County and renamed the Central District. The rural district was transferred to the new Afrineh District, and Anarrud-e Bozorg was transferred to Afrineh Rural District in the same district.
