= Cheshmeh Sorkheh Mohammadi =

Village in Lorestan province, Iran

Cheshmeh Sorkheh Mohammadi Persian: چشمه سرخه محمدي
- Village
- Country: Iran
- Province: Lorestan
- County: Mamulan
- District: Afrineh
- Rural District: Afrineh

Population (2016)
  - Total: Below reporting threshold
- Time zone: UTC+3:30 (IRST)

Cheshmeh Sorkheh Mohammadi (Persian: چشمه سرخه محمدي) (Note: Also romanized as Cheshmeh Sorkheh Moḥammadī) is a village in Afrineh Rural District of Afrineh District in Mamulan County, Lorestan province, Iran.

== Demographics ==
=== Population ===
At the time of the 2006 National Census, the village's population was 77 in 13 households, when it was in Mamulan District (Note: Renamed the Central District of Mamulan County) of Pol-e Dokhtar County. The following census in 2011 counted 28 people in six households. The 2016 census measured the population of the village as below the reporting threshold.

In 2023, the district was separated from the county in the establishment of Mamulan County and renamed the Central District. The rural district was transferred to the new Afrineh District.
