= Bisheh Zardeh =

Village in Lorestan province, Iran

Bisheh Zardeh Persian: بيشه زرده
- Village
- Location within Iran
- Coordinates: 33°14′24″N 47°58′38″E
- Country: Iran
- Province: Lorestan
- County: Mamulan
- District: Afrineh
- Rural District: Afrineh

Population (2016)
  - Total: 194
- Time zone: UTC+3:30 (IRST)

Bisheh Zardeh (Persian: بيشه زرده) (Note: Also romanized as Bīsheh Zardeh) is a village in Afrineh Rural District of Afrineh District in Mamulan County, Lorestan province, Iran.

== Demographics ==
=== Population ===
At the time of the 2006 National Census, the village's population was 125 in 27 households, when it was in Mamulan District (Note: Renamed the Central District of Mamulan County) of Pol-e Dokhtar County. The following census in 2011 counted 124 people in 29 households. The 2016 census measured the population of the village as 194 people in 58 households.

In 2023, the district was separated from the county in the establishment of Mamulan County and renamed the Central District. The rural district was transferred to the new Afrineh District.
