= Domrud-e Amir-e Bala =

Village in Lorestan province, Iran

Domrud-e Amir-e Bala Persian: دمرود امير بالا
- Village
- Location within Iran
- Country: Iran
- Province: Lorestan
- County: Mamulan
- District: Central
- Rural District: Zivdar

Population (2016)
  - Total: 80
- Time zone: UTC+3:30 (IRST)

Domrud-e Amir-e Bala (Persian: دمرود امير بالا) (Note: Also romanized as Domrūd-e Amīr-e Bālā; formerly known as Domrud-e Amir-e Olya (دمروداميرعليا), also romanized as Domrūd-e Amīr-e ‘Olyā) is a village in Zivdar Rural District of the Central District (Note: Formerly Mamulan District of Pol-e Dokhtar County) in Mamulan County, Lorestan province, Iran.

== Demographics ==
=== Population ===
At the time of the 2006 National Census, the village's population, as Domrud-e Amir-e Olya, was 72 in 16 households, when it was in Afrineh Rural District of Mamulan District (Note: Renamed the Central District of Mamulan County) in Pol-e Dokhtar County. The following census in 2011 counted 218 people in 52 households, by which time the village was listed as Domrud-e Amir-e Bala. The 2016 census measured the population of the village as 80 people in 27 households.

In 2023, the district was separated from the county in the establishment of Mamulan County and renamed the Central District. The rural district was transferred to the new Afrineh District, and Domrud-e Amir-e Bala was transferred to Zivdar Rural District created in the Central District.
