= Domrud-e Amir-e Vosta =

Village in Lorestan province, Iran

Domrud-e Amir-e Vosta Persian: دم روداميروسطي
- Village
- Location within Iran
- Country: Iran
- Province: Lorestan
- County: Mamulan
- District: Central
- Rural District: Zivdar

Population (2016)
  - Total: 92
- Time zone: UTC+3:30 (IRST)

Domrud-e Amir-e Vosta (Persian: دم روداميروسطي) (Note: Also romanized as Domrūd-e Amīr-e Vosţá) is a village in Zivdar Rural District of the Central District (Note: Formerly Mamulan District of Pol-e Dokhtar County) in Mamulan County, Lorestan province, Iran.

== Demographics ==
=== Population ===
At the time of the 2006 National Census, the village's population was 74 in 18 households, when it was in Afrineh Rural District of Mamulan District (Note: Renamed the Central District of Mamulan County) in Pol-e Dokhtar County. The following census in 2011 counted 73 people in 22 households. The 2016 census measured the population of the village as 92 people in 30 households.

In 2023, the district was separated from the county in the establishment of Mamulan County and renamed the Central District. The rural district was transferred to the new Afrineh District, and Domrud-e Amir-e Vosta was transferred to Zivdar Rural District created in the Central District.
