= Meleh-ye Posht-e Sar Takht =

Village in Lorestan province, Iran

Meleh-ye Posht-e Sar Takht Persian: مله پشت سرتخت
- Village
- Location within Iran
- Coordinates: 33°18′29″N 47°55′28″E
- Country: Iran
- Province: Lorestan
- County: Mamulan
- District: Afrineh
- Rural District: Afrineh

Population (2016)
  - Total: 22
- Time zone: UTC+3:30 (IRST)

Meleh-ye Posht-e Sar Takht (Persian: مله پشت سرتخت) (Note: Also known as Posht Melleh-ye Sar Takht) is a village in Afrineh Rural District of Afrineh District in Mamulan County, Lorestan province, Iran.

== Demographics ==
=== Population ===
At the time of the 2006 National Census, the village's population was 33 in six households, when it was in Mamulan District (Note: Renamed the Central District of Mamulan County) of Pol-e Dokhtar County. The following census in 2011 counted 27 people in six households. The 2016 census measured the population of the village as 22 people in five households.

In 2023, the district was separated from the county in the establishment of Mamulan County and renamed the Central District. The rural district was transferred to the new Afrineh District.
