= Darsafeh =

Village in Lorestan province, Iran

Darsafeh Persian: دارصافه
- Village
- Location within Iran
- Country: Iran
- Province: Lorestan
- County: Mamulan
- District: Afrineh
- Rural District: Afrineh

Population (2016)
  - Total: 47
- Time zone: UTC+3:30 (IRST)

Darsafeh (Persian: دارصافه) (Note: Also romanized as Dārşāfeh) is a village in Afrineh Rural District of Afrineh District in Mamulan County, Lorestan province, Iran.

== Demographics ==
=== Population ===
At the time of the 2006 National Census, the village's population was 59 in 10 households, when it was in Miyankuh-e Sharqi Rural District of Mamulan District (Note: Renamed the Central District in Mamulan County) in Pol-e Dokhtar County. The following census in 2011 counted 41 people in seven households. The 2016 census measured the population of the village as 47 people in nine households.

In 2023, the district was separated from the county in the establishment of Mamulan County and renamed the Central District. The rural district was transferred to the new Afrineh District, and Darsafeh was transferred to Afrineh Rural District in the same district.
