= Latvand-e Baraftab =

Village in Lorestan province, Iran

Latvand-e Baraftab Persian: لتوندبرافتاب
- Village
- Location within Iran
- Country: Iran
- Province: Lorestan
- County: Mamulan
- District: Afrineh
- Rural District: Afrineh

Population (2016)
  - Total: 45
- Time zone: UTC+3:30 (IRST)

Latvand-e Baraftab (Persian: لتوندبرافتاب) (Note: Also romanized as Latvand-e Bar Āftāb and Latvand-e Barāftāb; also known as Laqvand-e Barāftāb and Latvand) is a village in Afrineh Rural District of Afrineh District in Mamulan County, Lorestan province, Iran.

== Demographics ==
=== Population ===
At the time of the 2006 National Census, the village's population was 94 in 19 households, when it was in Miyankuh-e Sharqi Rural District of Mamulan District (Note: Renamed the Central District in Mamulan County) in Pol-e Dokhtar County. The following census in 2011 counted 81 people in 19 households. The 2016 census measured the population of the village as 45 people in 11 households.

In 2023, the district was separated from the county in the establishment of Mamulan County and renamed the Central District. The rural district was transferred to the new Afrineh District, and Latvand-e Baraftab was transferred to Afrineh Rural District in the same district.
