= Afrineh =

Village in Lorestan province, Iran

Afrineh Persian: افرينه
- Village
- Location within Iran
- Coordinates: 33°18′53″N 47°53′08″E
- Country: Iran
- Province: Lorestan
- County: Mamulan
- District: Afrineh
- Rural District: Afrineh

Population (2016)
  - Total: 1,944
- Time zone: UTC+3:30 (IRST)

Afrineh (Persian: افرينه) (Note: Also romanized as Afrīnah, and Afrīneh; also known as Afrīneh-ye Bālā and Afrīneh-ye ‘Olyā) is a village in Afrineh Rural District of Afrineh District in Mamulan County, Lorestan province, Iran, serving as capital of both the district and the rural district.

== Demographics ==
=== Population ===
At the time of the 2006 National Census, the village's population was 2,185 in 460 households, when it was in Mamulan District (Note: Renamed the Central District of Mamulan County) of Pol-e Dokhtar County. The following census in 2011 counted 1,986 people in 517 households. The 2016 census measured the population of the village as 1,944 people in 555 households, the most populous in its rural district.

In 2023, the district was separated from the county in the establishment of Mamulan County and renamed the Central District. The rural district was transferred to the new Afrineh District.
