= Dust Mohammad, Lorestan =

Village in Lorestan province, Iran

Dust Mohammad Persian: دوستمحمد
- Village
- Location within Iran
- Country: Iran
- Province: Lorestan
- County: Mamulan
- District: Central
- Rural District: Mamulan

Population (2016)
  - Total: 13
- Time zone: UTC+3:30 (IRST)

Dust Mohammad (Persian: دوستمحمد) (Note: Also romanized as Dūst Moḥammad) is a village in Mamulan Rural District of the Central District (Note: Formerly Mamulan District of Pol-e Dokhtar County) in Mamulan County, Lorestan province, Iran.

== Demographics ==
=== Population ===
At the time of the 2006 National Census, the village's population was 14 in four households, when it was in Mamulan District (Note: Renamed the Central District of Mamulan County) of Pol-e Dokhtar County. The following census in 2011 counted 19 people in six households. The 2016 census measured the population of the village as 13 people in four households.

In 2023, the district was separated from the county in the establishment of Mamulan County and renamed the Central District.
