= Aqa Mohammad =

Village in Lorestan province, Iran

Aqa Mohammad Persian: طاق پل
- Village
- Location within Iran
- Country: Iran
- Province: Lorestan
- County: Mamulan
- District: Central
- Rural District: Mamulan

Population (2016)
  - Total: 194
- Time zone: UTC+3:30 (IRST)

Aqa Mohammad (Persian: اقامحمد) (Note: Also romanized as Āqā Moḥammad) is a village in Mamulan Rural District of the Central District (Note: Formerly Mamulan District of Pol-e Dokhtar County) in Mamulan County, Lorestan province, Iran.

== Demographics ==
=== Population ===
At the time of the 2006 National Census, the village's population was 52 in 11 households, when it was in Mamulan District (Note: Renamed the Central District of Mamulan County) of Pol-e Dokhtar County. The following census in 2011 counted 34 people in eight households. The 2016 census measured the population of the village as 26 people in eight households.

In 2023, the district was separated from the county in the establishment of Mamulan County and renamed the Central District.
