= Cheshmeh Kabud, Mamulan =

Village in Lorestan province, Iran

Cheshmeh Kabud Persian: چشمه کبود
- Village
- Location within Iran
- Coordinates: 33°24′10″N 48°00′53″E
- Country: Iran
- Province: Lorestan
- County: Mamulan
- District: Central
- Rural District: Mamulan

Population (2016)
  - Total: 170
- Time zone: UTC+3:30 (IRST)

Cheshmeh Kabud (Persian: چشمه کبود) (Note: Also romanized as Cheshmeh Kabūd; also known as Cheshmeh Kabūd-e Soflá) is a village in Mamulan Rural District of the Central District (Note: Formerly Mamulan District of Pol-e Dokhtar County) in Mamulan County, Lorestan province, Iran.

== Demographics ==
=== Population ===
At the time of the 2006 National Census, the village's population was 205 in 44 households, when it was in Mamulan District (Note: Renamed the Central District of Mamulan County) of Pol-e Dokhtar County. The following census in 2011 counted 204 people in 50 households. The 2016 census measured the population of the village as 170 people in 53 households.

In 2023, the district was separated from the county in the establishment of Mamulan County and renamed the Central District.
