= Chak-e Sabz Ali =

Village in Lorestan province, Iran

Chak-e Sabz Ali Persian: چک سبز علي
- Village
- Location within Iran
- Coordinates: 33°24′02″N 47°59′53″E
- Country: Iran
- Province: Lorestan
- County: Mamulan
- District: Central
- Rural District: Mamulan

Population (2016)
  - Total: 64
- Time zone: UTC+3:30 (IRST)

Chak-e Sabz Ali (Persian: چک سبز علي) (Note: Also romanized as Chak-e Sabz ‘Alī and Chok-e Sabz‘alī; formerly known as Chak-e Sabz-e Olya (چك سبزعليا), also romanized as Chak-e Sabz ‘Olyā and Chak-e Sabz-e ‘Olyā; also known as Chak-e Sabz ‘Alī) is a village in Mamulan Rural District of the Central District (Note: Formerly Mamulan District of Pol-e Dokhtar County) in Mamulan County, Lorestan province, Iran.

== Demographics ==
=== Population ===
At the time of the 2006 National Census, the village's population, as Chak-e Sabz-e Olya, was 106 in 20 households, when it was in Mamulan District (Note: Renamed the Central District of Mamulan County) of Pol-e Dokhtar County. The following census in 2011 counted 96 people in 23 households, by which time the village was listed as Chak-e Sabz Ali. The 2016 census measured the population of the village as 64 people in 23 households.

In 2023, the district was separated from the county in the establishment of Mamulan County and renamed the Central District.
