= Panbeh Kar, Mamulan =

Village in Lorestan province, Iran

Panbeh Kar Persian: پنبه كار
- Village
- Location within Iran
- Country: Iran
- Province: Lorestan
- County: Mamulan
- District: Afrineh
- Rural District: Afrineh

Population (2016)
  - Total: 21
- Time zone: UTC+3:30 (IRST)

Panbeh Kar (Persian: پنبه كار) (Note: Also romanized as Panbeh Kār) is a village in Afrineh Rural District of Afrineh District in Mamulan County, Lorestan province, Iran.

== Demographics ==
=== Population ===
At the time of the 2006 National Census, the village's population was 62 in 15 households, when it was in Miyankuh-e Sharqi Rural District of Mamulan District (Note: Renamed the Central District in Mamulan County) in Pol-e Dokhtar County. The following census in 2011 counted 51 people in 15 households. The 2016 census measured the population of the village as 21 people in six households.

In 2023, the district was separated from the county in the establishment of Mamulan County and renamed the Central District. The rural district was transferred to the new Afrineh District, and Panbeh Kar was transferred to Afrineh Rural District in the same district.
