= Amiran-e Kushki =

Village in Lorestan province, Iran

Amiran-e Kushki Persian: اميران کوشکي
- Village
- Location within Iran
- Coordinates: 33°22′32″N 47°57′20″E
- Country: Iran
- Province: Lorestan
- County: Mamulan
- District: Central
- Rural District: Mamulan

Population (2016)
  - Total: 59
- Time zone: UTC+3:30 (IRST)

Amiran-e Kushki (Persian: اميران کوشکي) (Note: Also romanized as Amīrān-e Kūshkī; formerly known as Kushki (كوشكي), also romanized as Kūshkī; also known as Kūshkī-ye Amīrān) is a village in Mamulan Rural District of the Central District (Note: Formerly Mamulan District of Pol-e Dokhtar County) in Mamulan County, Lorestan province, Iran.

== Demographics ==
=== Population ===
At the time of the 2006 National Census, the village's population, as Kushki, was 105 in 24 households, when it was in Mamulan District (Note: Renamed the Central District of Mamulan County) of Pol-e Dokhtar County. The following census in 2011 counted 105 people in 28 households, by which time the village was listed as Amiran-e Kushki. The 2016 census measured the population of the village as 59 people in 19 households.

In 2023, the district was separated from the county in the establishment of Mamulan County and renamed the Central District.
