= Dehlich =

Village in Lorestan province, Iran

Dehlich Persian: دهليچ
- Village
- Location within Iran
- Coordinates: 33°09′01″N 48°05′40″E
- Country: Iran
- Province: Lorestan
- County: Mamulan
- District: Afrineh
- Rural District: Afrineh

Population (2016)
  - Total: 98
- Time zone: UTC+3:30 (IRST)

Dehlich (Persian: دهليچ) (Note: Also romanized as Dehlīch; also known as Deh Līz, and Dehlīz) is a village in Afrineh Rural District of Afrineh District in Mamulan County, Lorestan province, Iran.

== Demographics ==
=== Population ===
At the time of the 2006 National Census, the village's population was 143 in 28 households, when it was in Miyankuh-e Sharqi Rural District of Mamulan District (Note: Renamed the Central District in Mamulan County) in Pol-e Dokhtar County. The following census in 2011 counted 133 people in 35 households. The 2016 census measured the population of the village as 98 people in 26 households.

In 2023, the district was separated from the county in the establishment of Mamulan County and renamed the Central District. The rural district was transferred to the new Afrineh District, and Dehlich was transferred to Afrineh Rural District in the same district.
