= Cham Qabrestan, Mamulan =

Village in Lorestan province, Iran

Cham Qabrestan Persian: چم قبرستان
- Village
- Location within Iran
- Coordinates: 33°16′13″N 47°56′26″E
- Country: Iran
- Province: Lorestan
- County: Mamulan
- District: Afrineh
- Rural District: Afrineh

Population (2016)
  - Total: 0
- Time zone: UTC+3:30 (IRST)

Cham Qabrestan (Persian: چم قبرستان) (Note: Also romanized as Cham Qabrestān) is a village in Afrineh Rural District of Afrineh District in Mamulan County, Lorestan province, Iran.

== Demographics ==
=== Population ===
At the time of the 2006 National Census, the village's population was 24 in five households, when it was in Mamulan District (Note: Renamed the Central District of Mamulan County) of Pol-e Dokhtar County. The following census in 2011 counted a population below the reporting threshold. The 2016 census measured the population of the village as zero.

In 2023, the district was separated from the county in the establishment of Mamulan County and renamed the Central District. The rural district was transferred to the new Afrineh District.
