= Chub Bor =

Village in Lorestan province, Iran

Chub Bor Persian: چوببر
- Village
- Location within Iran
- Coordinates: 33°23′42″N 48°01′28″E
- Country: Iran
- Province: Lorestan
- County: Mamulan
- District: Central
- Rural District: Mamulan

Population (2016)
  - Total: 120
- Time zone: UTC+3:30 (IRST)

Chub Bor (Persian: چوببر) (Note: Also romanized as Chūb Bor) is a village in Mamulan Rural District of the Central District (Note: Formerly Mamulan District of Pol-e Dokhtar County) in Mamulan County, Lorestan province, Iran.

== Demographics ==
=== Population ===
At the time of the 2006 National Census, the village's population was 99 in 21 households, when it was in Mamulan District (Note: Renamed the Central District of Mamulan County) of Pol-e Dokhtar County. The following census in 2011 counted 89 people in 23 households. The 2016 census measured the population of the village as 120 people in 36 households.

In 2023, the district was separated from the county in the establishment of Mamulan County and renamed the Central District.
