= Heygeh-ye Kaliab =

Village in Lorestan province, Iran

Heygeh-ye Kaliab Persian: هيگه كالياب
- Village
- Location within Iran
- Coordinates: 33°27′03″N 47°52′12″E
- Country: Iran
- Province: Lorestan
- County: Mamulan
- District: Central
- Rural District: Mamulan

Population (2016)
  - Total: 52
- Time zone: UTC+3:30 (IRST)

Heygeh-ye Kaliab (Persian: هيگه كالياب) (Note: Also romanized as Heygeh-e Kaliab, Heygeh-e Kālīāb, and Heygeh-ye Kālīāb; also known as Heygeh-e Ebrāhīm and Hegeh-e Kālīāb-e Yek) is a village in Mamulan Rural District of the Central District (Note: Formerly Mamulan District of Pol-e Dokhtar County) in Mamulan County, Lorestan province, Iran.

== Demographics ==
=== Population ===
At the time of the 2006 National Census, the village's population was 60 in 14 households, when it was in Mamulan District (Note: Renamed the Central District of Mamulan County) of Pol-e Dokhtar County. The following census in 2011 counted 76 people in 18 households. The 2016 census measured the population of the village as 52 people in 16 households.

In 2023, the district was separated from the county in the establishment of Mamulan County and renamed the Central District.
