= Tudar-e Shah Karami =

Village in Lorestan province, Iran

Tudar-e Shah Karami Persian: تودارشاه كرمي
- Village
- Location within Iran
- Country: Iran
- Province: Lorestan
- County: Mamulan
- District: Central
- Rural District: Mamulan

Population (2016)
  - Total: 41
- Time zone: UTC+3:30 (IRST)

Tudar-e Shah Karami (Persian: تودارشاه كرمي) (Note: Also romanized as Tūdār-e Shāh Karamī; also known as Tūdar-e Shākerī) is a village in Mamulan Rural District of the Central District (Note: Formerly Mamulan District of Pol-e Dokhtar County) in Mamulan County, Lorestan province, Iran.

== Demographics ==
=== Population ===
At the time of the 2006 National Census, the village's population was 91 in 24 households, when it was in Mamulan District (Note: Renamed the Central District of Mamulan County) of Pol-e Dokhtar County. The following census in 2011 counted 98 people in 24 households. The 2016 census measured the population of the village as 41 people in 14 households.

In 2023, the district was separated from the county in the establishment of Mamulan County and renamed the Central District.
