= Taq-e Pol =

Village in Lorestan province, Iran

Taq-e Pol Persian: طاق پل
- Village
- Location within Iran
- Coordinates: 33°23′07″N 48°01′49″E
- Country: Iran
- Province: Lorestan
- County: Mamulan
- District: Central
- Rural District: Mamulan

Population (2016)
  - Total: 194
- Time zone: UTC+3:30 (IRST)

Taq-e Pol (Persian: طاق پل) (Note: Also romanized as Ţāq-e Pol) is a village in Mamulan Rural District of the Central District (Note: Formerly Mamulan District of Pol-e Dokhtar County) in Mamulan County, Lorestan province, Iran.

== Demographics ==
=== Population ===
At the time of the 2006 National Census, the village's population was 217 in 45 households, when it was in Mamulan District (Note: Renamed the Central District of Mamulan County) of Pol-e Dokhtar County. The following census in 2011 counted 228 people in 62 households. The 2016 census measured the population of the village as 194 people in 54 households.

In 2023, the district was separated from the county in the establishment of Mamulan County and renamed the Central District.
