= Chogha Soleyman =

Village in Lorestan province, Iran

Chogha Soleyman Persian: چغاسليمان
- Village
- Location within Iran
- Coordinates: 33°22′43″N 48°02′33″E
- Country: Iran
- Province: Lorestan
- County: Mamulan
- District: Central
- Rural District: Mamulan

Population (2016)
  - Total: 147
- Time zone: UTC+3:30 (IRST)

Chogha Soleyman (Persian: چغاسليمان) (Note: Also romanized as Choghā Soleymān; also known as Choghā Salmān) is a village in Mamulan Rural District of the Central District (Note: Formerly Mamulan District of Pol-e Dokhtar County) in Mamulan County, Lorestan province, Iran.

== Demographics ==
=== Population ===
At the time of the 2006 National Census, the village's population was 216 in 45 households, when it was in Mamulan District (Note: Renamed the Central District of Mamulan County) of Pol-e Dokhtar County. The following census in 2011 counted 180 people in 46 households. The 2016 census measured the population of the village as 147 people in 40 households.

In 2023, the district was separated from the county in the establishment of Mamulan County and renamed the Central District.
