= Darvaz Now =

Village in Lorestan province, Iran

Darvaz Now Persian: دروزنو
- Village
- Location within Iran
- Coordinates: 33°25′57″N 47°55′03″E
- Country: Iran
- Province: Lorestan
- County: Mamulan
- District: Central
- Rural District: Mamulan

Population (2016)
  - Total: 109
- Time zone: UTC+3:30 (IRST)

Darvaz Now (Persian: دروزنو) is a village in Mamulan Rural District of the Central District (Note: Formerly Mamulan District of Pol-e Dokhtar County) in Mamulan County, Lorestan province, Iran.

== Demographics ==
=== Population ===
At the time of the 2006 National Census, the village's population was 71 in 13 households, when it was in Mamulan District (Note: Renamed the Central District of Mamulan County) of Pol-e Dokhtar County. The following census in 2011 counted 54 people in 14 households. The 2016 census measured the population of the village as 109 people in 33 households.

In 2023, the district was separated from the county in the establishment of Mamulan County and renamed the Central District.
