= Cham-e Shahran =

Village in Lorestan province, Iran

Cham-e Shahran Persian: چم شهران
- Village
- Location within Iran
- Coordinates: 33°21′14″N 47°55′46″E
- Country: Iran
- Province: Lorestan
- County: Mamulan
- District: Central
- Rural District: Mamulan

Population (2016)
  - Total: 104
- Time zone: UTC+3:30 (IRST)

Cham-e Shahran (Persian: چم شهران) (Note: Also romanized as Cham-e Shahrān; also known as Shahīd Chamrān) is a village in Mamulan Rural District of the Central District (Note: Formerly Mamulan District of Pol-e Dokhtar County) in Mamulan County, Lorestan province, Iran.

== Demographics ==
=== Population ===
At the time of the 2006 National Census, the village's population was 154 in 34 households, when it was in Mamulan District (Note: Renamed the Central District of Mamulan County) of Pol-e Dokhtar County. The following census in 2011 counted 110 people in 30 households. The 2016 census measured the population of the village as 104 people in 33 households.

In 2023, the district was separated from the county in the establishment of Mamulan County and renamed the Central District.
