= Domrud =

Domrud or Dom Rud (Persian: دم رود) may refer to:

- Domrud-e Olya
- Domrud-e Sofla
- Domrud-e Amir (disambiguation)
