= Mahi Lan =

Village in Lorestan province, Iran

Mahi Lan Persian: ماهي لان
- Village
- Location within Iran
- Country: Iran
- Province: Lorestan
- County: Mamulan
- District: Central
- Rural District: Mamulan

Population (2016)
  - Total: 49
- Time zone: UTC+3:30 (IRST)

Mahi Lan (Persian: ماهي لان) (Note: Also romanized as Māhī Lān) is a village in Mamulan Rural District of the Central District (Note: Formerly Mamulan District of Pol-e Dokhtar County) in Mamulan County, Lorestan province, Iran.

== Demographics ==
=== Population ===
At the time of the 2006 National Census, the village's population was 59 in 14 households, when it was in Mamulan District (Note: Renamed the Central District of Mamulan County) of Pol-e Dokhtar County. The following census in 2011 counted 62 people in 18 households. The 2016 census measured the population of the village as 49 people in 16 households.

In 2023, the district was separated from the county in the establishment of Mamulan County and renamed the Central District.
