= Bon Pahneh, Iran =

Village in Lorestan province, Iran

Bon Pahneh Persian: بن پهنه
- Village
- Location within Iran
- Coordinates: 33°24′29″N 47°52′48″E
- Country: Iran
- Province: Lorestan
- County: Mamulan
- District: Central
- Rural District: Mamulan

Population (2016)
  - Total: 0
- Time zone: UTC+3:30 (IRST)

Bon Pahneh (Persian: بن پهنه) (Note: Formely known as Bun Pahneh (بون پهنه), also romanized as Būn Pahneh) is a village in Mamulan Rural District of the Central District (Note: Formerly Mamulan District of Pol-e Dokhtar County) in Mamulan County, Lorestan province, Iran.

== Demographics ==
=== Population ===
At the time of the 2006 National Census, the village's population, as Bun Pahneh, was 56 in 13 households, when it was in Mamulan District (Note: Renamed the Central District of Mamulan County) of Pol-e Dokhtar County. The following census in 2011 counted a population below the reporting threshold, by which time the village was listed as Bon Pahneh. The 2016 census measured the population of the village as zero.

In 2023, the district was separated from the county in the establishment of Mamulan County and renamed the Central District.
