= Ali Mehdi =

Village in Lorestan province, Iran

Ali Mehdi Persian: علي مهدي
- Village
- Location within Iran
- Coordinates: 33°25′56″N 47°59′41″E
- Country: Iran
- Province: Lorestan
- County: Mamulan
- District: Central
- Rural District: Mamulan

Population (2016)
  - Total: Below reporting threshold
- Time zone: UTC+3:30 (IRST)

Ali Mehdi (Persian: علي مهدي) (Note: Also romanized as ‘Alī Mehdī) is a village in Mamulan Rural District of the Central District (Note: Formerly Mamulan District of Pol-e Dokhtar County) in Mamulan County, Lorestan province, Iran.

== Demographics ==
=== Population ===
At the time of the 2006 National Census, the village's population was 18 in four households, when it was in Mamulan District (Note: Renamed the Central District of Mamulan County) of Pol-e Dokhtar County. The following census in 2011 counted 29 people in eight households. The 2016 census measured the population of the village as below the reporting threshold.

In 2023, the district was separated from the county in the establishment of Mamulan County and renamed the Central District.
