= Cham-e Murt, Afrineh =

Village in Lorestan province, Iran

Cham-e Murt Persian: چم مورت
- Village
- Country: Iran
- Province: Lorestan
- County: Mamulan
- District: Afrineh
- Rural District: Afrineh

Population (2016)
  - Total: 69
- Time zone: UTC+3:30 (IRST)

Cham-e Murt (Persian: چم مورت) (Note: Also romanized as Cham-e Mūrt) is a village in Afrineh Rural District of Afrineh District in Mamulan County, Lorestan province, Iran.

== Demographics ==
=== Population ===
At the time of the 2006 National Census, the village's population was 107 in 20 households, when it was in Mamulan District (Note: Renamed the Central District of Mamulan County) of Pol-e Dokhtar County. The following census in 2011 counted 95 people in 22 households. The 2016 census measured the population of the village as 69 people in 16 households.

In 2023, the district was separated from the county in the establishment of Mamulan County and renamed the Central District. The rural district was transferred to the new Afrineh District.
