= Cham-e Qalandar =

Village in Lorestan province, Iran

Cham-e Qalandar Persian: چمقلندر
- Village
- Location within Iran
- Coordinates: 33°25′22″N 47°56′01″E
- Country: Iran
- Province: Lorestan
- County: Mamulan
- District: Central
- Rural District: Mamulan

Population (2016)
  - Total: 64
- Time zone: UTC+3:30 (IRST)

Cham-e Qalandar (Persian: چمقلندر) is a village in Mamulan Rural District of the Central District (Note: Formerly Mamulan District of Pol-e Dokhtar County) in Mamulan County, Lorestan province, Iran.

== Demographics ==
=== Population ===
At the time of the 2006 National Census, the village's population was 105 in 24 households, when it was in Mamulan District (Note: Renamed the Central District of Mamulan County) of Pol-e Dokhtar County. The following census in 2011 counted 111 people in 31 households. The 2016 census measured the population of the village as 64 people in 16 households.

In 2023, the district was separated from the county in the establishment of Mamulan County and renamed the Central District.
