= Kur Shurab-e Alishah =

Village in Lorestan province, Iran

Kur Shurab-e Alishah Persian: كورشوراب عليشاه
- Village
- Location within Iran
- Coordinates: 33°28′09″N 47°51′00″E
- Country: Iran
- Province: Lorestan
- County: Mamulan
- District: Central
- Rural District: Mamulan

Population (2016)
  - Total: 115
- Time zone: UTC+3:30 (IRST)

Kur Shurab-e Alishah (Persian: كورشوراب عليشاه) (Note: Also romanized as Kūr Shūrāb-e ‘Alīshāh; also known as Kūr Shūrāb-e Soflá) is a village in Mamulan Rural District of the Central District (Note: Formerly Mamulan District of Pol-e Dokhtar County) in Mamulan County, Lorestan province, Iran.

== Demographics ==
=== Population ===
At the time of the 2006 National Census, the village's population was 130 in 28 households, when it was in Mamulan District (Note: Renamed the Central District of Mamulan County) of Pol-e Dokhtar County. The following census in 2011 counted 113 people in 29 households. The 2016 census measured the population of the village as 115 people in 31 households.

In 2023, the district was separated from the county in the establishment of Mamulan County and renamed the Central District.
