= Bon Keshkeh =

Village in Lorestan province, Iran

Bon Keshkeh Persian: بن كشكه
- Village
- Location within Iran
- Coordinates: 33°25′14″N 47°57′46″E
- Country: Iran
- Province: Lorestan
- County: Mamulan
- District: Central
- Rural District: Mamulan

Population (2016)
  - Total: 247
- Time zone: UTC+3:30 (IRST)

Bon Keshkeh (Persian: بن كشكه) (Note: Also known as Bon Keshgeh) is a village in Mamulan Rural District of the Central District (Note: Formerly Mamulan District of Pol-e Dokhtar County) in Mamulan County, Lorestan province, Iran.

== Demographics ==
=== Population ===
At the time of the 2006 National Census, the village's population was 206 in 46 households, when it was in Mamulan District (Note: Renamed the Central District of Mamulan County) of Pol-e Dokhtar County. The following census in 2011 counted 228 people in 63 households. The 2016 census measured the population of the village as 247 people in 76 households.

In 2023, the district was separated from the county in the establishment of Mamulan County and renamed the Central District.
