= Sarfarash =

Village in Lorestan province, Iran

Sarfarash Persian: سرفراش
- Village
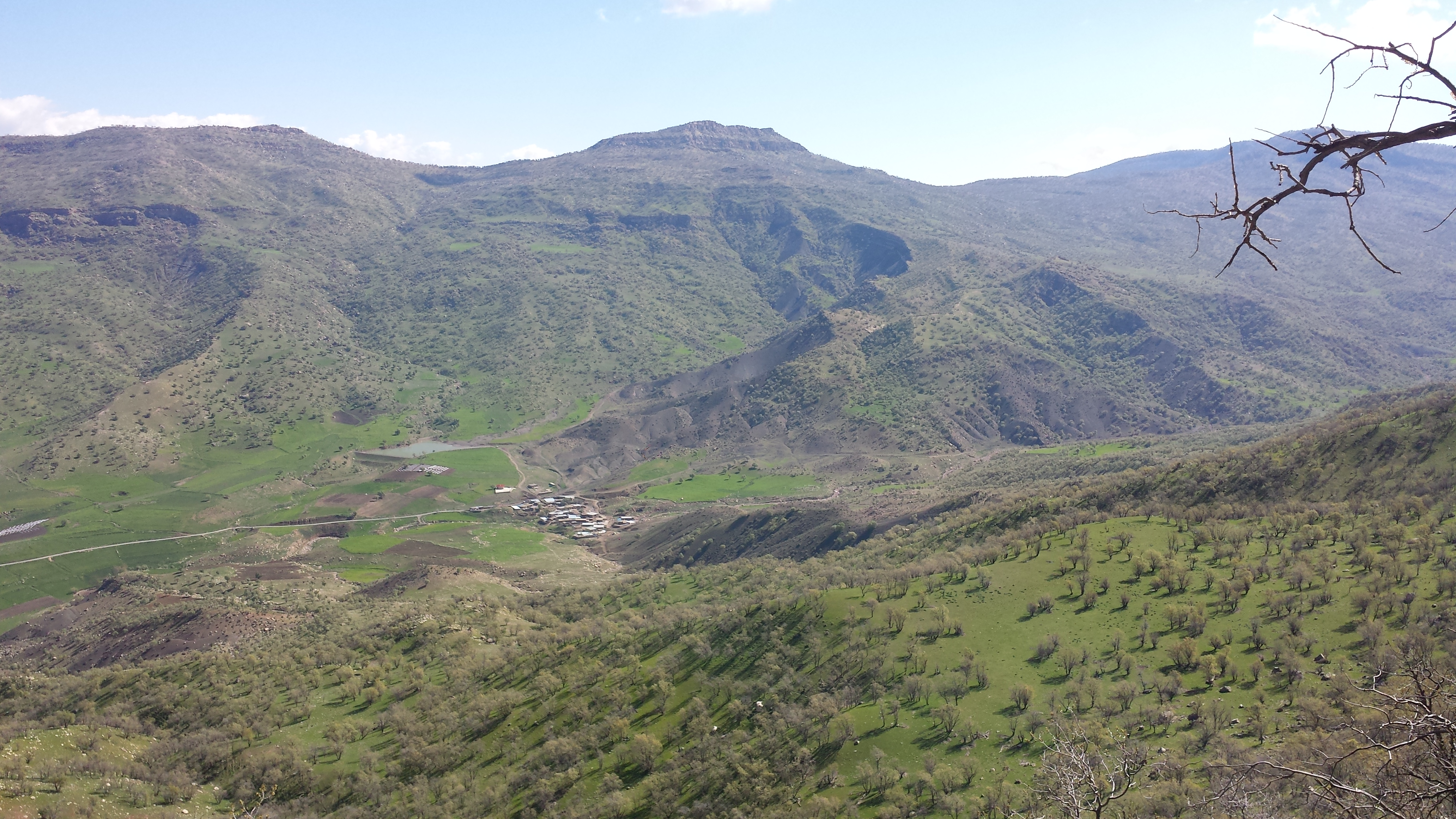
- The village of Sarfarash

- Location within Iran
- Coordinates: 33°21′03″N 48°03′51″E
- Country: Iran
- Province: Lorestan
- County: Mamulan
- District: Central
- Rural District: Mamulan

Population (2016)
  - Total: 105
- Time zone: UTC+3:30 (IRST)

Sarfarash (Persian: سرفراش) (Note: Also romanized as Sar Farrāsh and Sarfarāsh; also known as Sarfarāsh-e ‘Olyā) is a village in Mamulan Rural District of the Central District (Note: Formerly Mamulan District of Pol-e Dokhtar County) in Mamulan County, Lorestan province, Iran.

== Demographics ==
=== Population ===
At the time of the 2006 National Census, the village's population was 133 in 28 households, when it was in Mamulan District (Note: Renamed the Central District of Mamulan County) of Pol-e Dokhtar County. The following census in 2011 counted 107 people in 32 households. The 2016 census measured the population of the village as 105 people in 30 households.

In 2023, the district was separated from the county in the establishment of Mamulan County and renamed the Central District.
