= Bon Tuman =

Bon Tuman or Bontuman (Persian: بن تومان) may refer to:

- Bon Tuman 1
- Bon Tuman 2
- Bon Tuman 3
