= Cham Kabud, Lorestan =

Village in Lorestan province, Iran

Cham Kabud Persian: چم كبود
- Village
- Location within Iran
- Country: Iran
- Province: Lorestan
- County: Mamulan
- District: Central
- Rural District: Mamulan

Population (2016)
  - Total: 23
- Time zone: UTC+3:30 (IRST)

Cham Kabud (Persian: چم كبود) (Note: Also romanized as Cham Kabūd) is a village in Mamulan Rural District of the Central District (Note: Formerly Mamulan District of Pol-e Dokhtar County) in Mamulan County, Lorestan province, Iran.

== Demographics ==
=== Population ===
At the time of the 2006 National Census, the village's population was 41 in nine households, when it was in Mamulan District (Note: Renamed the Central District of Mamulan County) of Pol-e Dokhtar County. The following census in 2011 counted 38 people in eight households. The 2016 census measured the population of the village as 23 people in seven households.

In 2023, the district was separated from the county in the establishment of Mamulan County and renamed the Central District.
