= Cham-e Heydar =

Cham-e Heydar (Persian: چم حيدر) may refer to:

- Cham-e Heydar, Isfahan
- Cham-e Heydar, Kermanshah
- Cham-e Heydar, Afrineh, Lorestan Province
- Cham-e Heydar, Mamulan, Lorestan Province
