= Domrud-e Olya =

Village in Lorestan province, Iran

Domrud-e Olya Persian: دمرود عليا
- Village
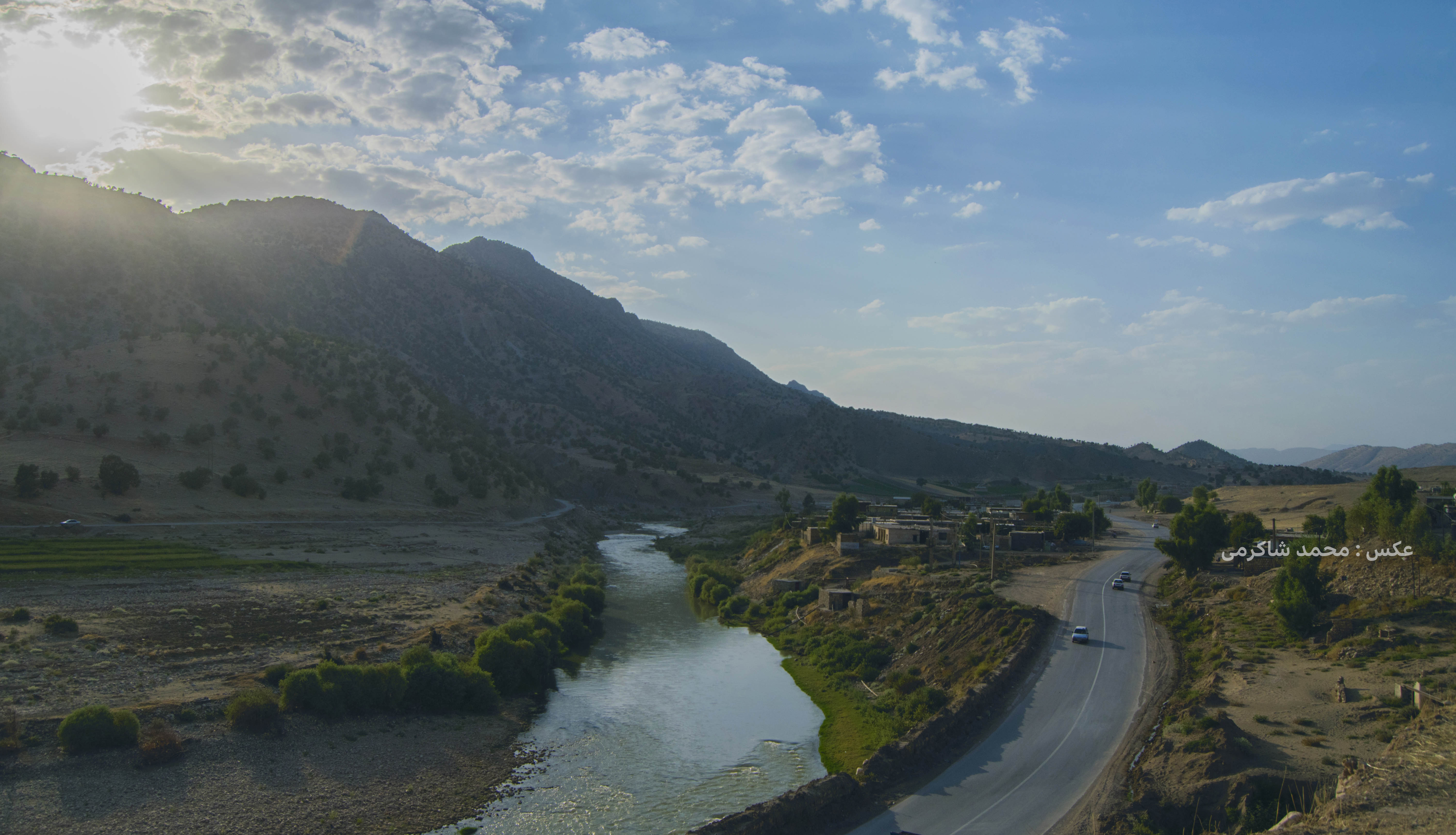
- The village of Domrud-e Olya

- Location within Iran
- Coordinates: 33°23′48″N 47°58′08″E
- Country: Iran
- Province: Lorestan
- County: Mamulan
- District: Central
- Rural District: Mamulan

Population (2016)
  - Total: 481
- Time zone: UTC+3:30 (IRST)

Domrud-e Olya (Persian: دم رودعليا) (Note: Also romanized as Domrūd-e ‘Olyā; also known as Changā’ī, Chin Kanī, Chingani, and Dom Rūd) is a village in Mamulan Rural District of the Central District (Note: Formerly Mamulan District of Pol-e Dokhtar County) in Mamulan County, Lorestan province, Iran.

== Demographics ==
=== Population ===
At the time of the 2006 National Census, the village's population was 527 in 120 households, when it was in Mamulan District (Note: Renamed the Central District of Mamulan County) of Pol-e Dokhtar County. The following census in 2011 counted 607 people in 163 households. The 2016 census measured the population of the village as 481 people in 138 households, the most populous in its rural district.

In 2023, the district was separated from the county in the establishment of Mamulan County and renamed the Central District.
