= Domrud-e Amir =

Domrud-e Amir (Persian: دمرودامير) may refer to:

- Domrud-e Amir-e Olya
- Domrud-e Amir-e Sofla
- Domrud-e Amir-e Vosta
