= Bon Tuman-e Seh =

Village in Lorestan province, Iran

Bon Tuman-e Seh Persian: بن تومان سه
- Village
- Location within Iran
- Coordinates: 33°24′40″N 47°57′17″E
- Country: Iran
- Province: Lorestan
- County: Mamulan
- District: Central
- Rural District: Mamulan

Population (2016)
  - Total: 95
- Time zone: UTC+3:30 (IRST)

Bon Tuman-e Seh (Persian: بن تومان سه) (Note: Also romanized as Bon Tūmān-e Seh and Bontūmān-e Seh) is a village in Mamulan Rural District of the Central District (Note: Formerly Mamulan District of Pol-e Dokhtar County) in Mamulan County, Lorestan province, Iran.

== Demographics ==
=== Population ===
At the time of the 2006 National Census, the village's population was 105 in 24 households, when it was in Mamulan District (Note: Renamed the Central District of Mamulan County) of Pol-e Dokhtar County. The following census in 2011 counted 103 people in 27 households. The 2016 census measured the population of the village as 95 people in 27 households.

In 2023, the district was separated from the county in the establishment of Mamulan County and renamed the Central District.
