= Bon Tuman-e Yek =

Village in Lorestan province, Iran

Bon Tuman-e Yek Persian: بن تومان يك
- Village
- Location within Iran
- Coordinates: 33°24′11″N 47°57′42″E
- Country: Iran
- Province: Lorestan
- County: Mamulan
- District: Central
- Rural District: Mamulan

Population (2016)
  - Total: 47
- Time zone: UTC+3:30 (IRST)

Bon Tuman-e Yek (Persian: بن تومان يك) (Note: Also romanized as Bon Tūmān-e Yek and Bontūmān-e Yek) is a village in Mamulan Rural District of the Central District (Note: Formerly Mamulan District of Pol-e Dokhtar County) in Mamulan County, Lorestan province, Iran.

== Demographics ==
=== Population ===
At the time of the 2006 National Census, the village's population was 77 in 20 households, when it was in Mamulan District (Note: Renamed the Central District of Mamulan County) of Pol-e Dokhtar County. The following census in 2011 counted 75 people in 19 households. The 2016 census measured the population of the village as 47 people in 14 households.

In 2023, the district was separated from the county in the establishment of Mamulan County and renamed the Central District.
