= Dul-e Gap, Lorestan =

Village in Lorestan province, Iran

Dul-e Gap Persian: دول گپ
- Village
- Location within Iran
- Coordinates: 33°24′27″N 47°58′12″E
- Country: Iran
- Province: Lorestan
- County: Mamulan
- District: Central
- Rural District: Mamulan

Population (2016)
  - Total: 29
- Time zone: UTC+3:30 (IRST)

Dul-e Gap (Persian: دول گپ) (Note: Also romanized as Dūl-e Gap; also known as Dovol-e Bozorg) is a village in Mamulan Rural District of the Central District (Note: Formerly Mamulan District of Pol-e Dokhtar County) in Mamulan County, Lorestan province, Iran.

== Demographics ==
=== Population ===
At the time of the 2006 National Census, the village's population was 33 in seven households, when it was in Mamulan District (Note: Renamed the Central District of Mamulan County) of Pol-e Dokhtar County. The following census in 2011 counted 40 people in 10 households. The 2016 census measured the population of the village as 29 people in 10 households.

In 2023, the district was separated from the county in the establishment of Mamulan County and renamed the Central District.
