= Dahleez =

Dahleez, Dehleez or Dehliz may refer to:

== Film and television ==
- Dehleez (film), a 1983 Pakistani Urdu-language drama film
- Dahleez (film), a 1986 Indian romantic-war action drama film by Ravi Chopra
- Dehliz (film) or The Corridor, 2013 Iranian film
- Dehleez (1981 TV series), a Pakistani television series
- Dehleez, a 2009 Indian program broadcast by Imagine TV
- Dahleez (2016 TV series), an Indian legal-drama series

== Places ==
- Dehliz, a village in Khuzestan, Iran
- Dehliz, Lorestan, or Dehlich, a village in Iran
- Dahliz, a proposed original etymon for Delhi
