= Cham-e Murt =

Cham-e Murt (Persian: چم مورت) may refer to:

- Cham-e Murt, Afrineh
- Cham-e Murt, Mamulan
