= Domrud-e Sofla =

Village in Lorestan province, Iran

Domrud-e Sofla Persian: دم رودسفلي
- Village
- Location within Iran
- Coordinates: 33°23′32″N 47°58′16″E
- Country: Iran
- Province: Lorestan
- County: Mamulan
- District: Central
- Rural District: Mamulan

Population (2016)
  - Total: 74
- Time zone: UTC+3:30 (IRST)

Domrud-e Sofla (Persian: دم رودسفلي) (Note: Also romanized as Domrūd-e Soflá) is a village in Mamulan Rural District of the Central District (Note: Formerly Mamulan District of Pol-e Dokhtar County) in Mamulan County, Lorestan province, Iran.

== Demographics ==
=== Population ===
At the time of the 2006 National Census, the village's population was 144 in 32 households, when it was in Mamulan District (Note: Renamed the Central District of Mamulan County) of Pol-e Dokhtar County. The following census in 2011 counted 115 people in 33 households. The 2016 census measured the population of the village as 74 people in 24 households.

In 2023, the district was separated from the county in the establishment of Mamulan County and renamed the Central District.
