= Dul-e Gap =

Dul-e Gap (Persian: دول گپ) may refer to:

- Dul-e Gap, Khuzestan
- Dul-e Gap, Lorestan
