= Cham-e Murt, Mamulan =

Village in Lorestan province, Iran

Cham-e Murt Persian: چم مورت
- Village
- Location within Iran
- Coordinates: 33°25′02″N 47°57′54″E
- Country: Iran
- Province: Lorestan
- County: Mamulan
- District: Central
- Rural District: Mamulan

Population (2016)
  - Total: 386
- Time zone: UTC+3:30 (IRST)

Cham-e Murt (Persian: چم مورت) (Note: Also romanized as Cham-e Mūrt; also known as Cham-e Mūrd and Jadsir) is a village in Mamulan Rural District of the Central District (Note: Formerly Mamulan District of Pol-e Dokhtar County) in Mamulan County, Lorestan province, Iran.

== Demographics ==
=== Population ===
At the time of the 2006 National Census, the village's population was 529 in 118 households, when it was in Mamulan District (Note: Renamed the Central District of Mamulan County) of Pol-e Dokhtar County. The following census in 2011 counted 491 people in 141 households. The 2016 census measured the population of the village as 386 people in 114 households.

In 2023, the district was separated from the county in the establishment of Mamulan County and renamed the Central District.
