= Cham-e Qahreman =

Village in Lorestan province, Iran

Cham-e Qahreman Persian: چمقهرمان
- Village
- Location within Iran
- Coordinates: 33°24′57″N 47°56′55″E
- Country: Iran
- Province: Lorestan
- County: Mamulan
- District: Central
- Rural District: Mamulan

Population (2016)
  - Total: 41
- Time zone: UTC+3:30 (IRST)

Cham-e Qahreman (Persian: چمقهرمان) (Note: Also romanized as Cham-e Qahremān; also known as Bon Tūmān-e Do (بن تومان دو)) is a village in Mamulan Rural District of the Central District (Note: Formerly Mamulan District of Pol-e Dokhtar County) in Mamulan County, Lorestan province, Iran.

== Demographics ==
=== Population ===
At the time of the 2006 National Census, the village's population was 46 in 10 households, when it was in Mamulan District (Note: Renamed the Central District of Mamulan County) of Pol-e Dokhtar County. The following census in 2011 counted 45 people in 10 households. The 2016 census measured the population of the village as 41 people in 11 households.

In 2023, the district was separated from the county in the establishment of Mamulan County and renamed the Central District.
