= Cham Qabrestan =

Cham Qabrestan (Persian: چم قبرستان) may refer to:

- Cham Qabrestan, Pol-e Dokhtar, Iranian village
- Cham Qabrestan, Selseleh, Iranian village
