= Cham-e Heydar, Mamulan =

Village in Lorestan province, Iran

Cham-e Heydar Persian: چم حيدر
- Village
- Location within Iran
- Coordinates: 33°25′55″N 47°56′42″E
- Country: Iran
- Province: Lorestan
- County: Mamulan
- District: Central
- Rural District: Mamulan

Population (2016)
  - Total: 74
- Time zone: UTC+3:30 (IRST)

Cham-e Heydar (Persian: چم حيدر) is a village in Mamulan Rural District of the Central District (Note: Formerly Mamulan District of Pol-e Dokhtar County) in Mamulan County, Lorestan province, Iran.

== Demographics ==
=== Population ===
At the time of the 2006 National Census, the village's population was 105 in 26 households, when it was in Mamulan District (Note: Renamed the Central District of Mamulan County) of Pol-e Dokhtar County. The following census in 2011 counted 96 people in 24 households. The 2016 census measured the population of the village as 74 people in 34 households.

In 2023, the district was separated from the county in the establishment of Mamulan County and renamed the Central District.
