= Cham Borreh =

Cham Borreh (Persian: چم بره) may refer to:

- Cham Borreh, Fars
- Cham Borreh, Lorestan
