= Zivdar Rural District =

Rural district in Lorestan province, Iran

Zivdar Rural District Persian: دهستان زیودار
- Rural District
- Location within Iran
- Coordinates: 33°21′N 47°46′E
- Country: Iran
- Province: Lorestan
- County: Mamulan
- District: Central
- Established: 2023
- Capital: Bon Lar
- Time zone: UTC+3:30 (IRST)

Zivdar Rural District (Persian: دهستان زیودار) is in the Central District (Note: Formerly Mamulan District of Pol-e Dokhtar County) of Mamulan County, Lorestan province, Iran. Its capital is the village of Bon Lar, whose population at the time of the 2016 National Census was 1,008 people in 277 households.

== History ==
In 2023, Mamulan District (Note: Renamed the Central District of Mamulan County) was separated from Pol-e Dokhtar County in the establishment of Mamulan County and renamed the Central District. Zivdar Rural District was created in the same district.

== Other villages in the rural district ==
- Baraftab
- Bargalan Sukhteh
- Cham-e Heydar
- Do Ab-e Zivdar
- Domrud-e Amir-e Bala
- Domrud-e Amir-e Pain
- Domrud-e Amir-e Vosta
- Kalat
- Lit Bar-e Zivdar
- Sarenjeh-ye Zivdar
- Sarmar
- Taq-e Abbasali
- Tarveh Morteza
- Zir Anbar-e Zivdar
- Zuran Tall
- Zuran Tall-e Zivdar
