= Panbeh Kar =

Panbeh Kar or Panbehkar (Persian: پنبه كار) may refer to:

- Panbeh Kar, Zaz and Mahru, a village in Zaz and Mahru District, Aligudarz County, Lorestan Province, Iran
- Panbeh Kar, Pol-e Dokhtar, a village in Pol-e Dokhtar County, Lorestan Province, Iran
