= Mamulan Rural District =

Rural district in Lorestan province, Iran

Mamulan Rural District Persian: دهستان معمولان
- Rural District
- Location within Iran
- Coordinates: 33°23′N 47°58′E
- Country: Iran
- Province: Lorestan
- County: Mamulan
- District: Central
- Established: 1987
- Capital: Mamulan

Population (2016)
  - Total: 3,077
- Time zone: UTC+3:30 (IRST)

Mamulan Rural District (Persian: دهستان معمولان) is in the Central District (Note: Formerly Mamulan District of Pol-e Dokhtar County) of Mamulan County, Lorestan province, Iran. It is administered from the city of Mamulan.

== Demographics ==
=== Population ===
At the time of the 2006 National Census, the rural district's population (as a part of Mamulan District (Note: Renamed the Central District of Mamulan County) in Pol-e Dokhtar County) was 3,825 in 854 households. There were 3,741 inhabitants in 1,001 households at the following census of 2011. The 2016 census measured the population of the rural district as 3,077 in 927 households. The most populous of its 45 villages was Domrud-e Olya, with 481 people.

In 2023, the district was separated from the county in the establishment of Mamulan County and renamed the Central District.

=== Other villages in the rural district ===
- Ali Mehdi
- Amiran-e Kushki
- Aqa Mohammad
- Barafi
- Bon Keshkeh
- Bon Pahneh
- Bon Tuman-e Yek
- Bon Tuman-e Seh
- Chak-e Sabz Ali
- Cham Kabud
- Cham-e Heydar
- Cham-e Murt
- Cham-e Qahreman
- Cham-e Qalandar
- Cham-e Shahran
- Cheshmeh Kabud
- Chogha Soleyman
- Chub Bor
- Darvaz Now
- Domrud-e Sofla
- Dul-e Gap
- Dust Mohammad
- Hapelaneh
- Heygeh-ye Kaliab
- Kur Shurab-e Alishah
- Mahi Lan
- Mashhadi Barag Jar
- Sarfarash
- Taq-e Pol
- Tudar-e Shah Karami
