= Kogan Cave =

Historic site in Iran

- Kabkan Cave
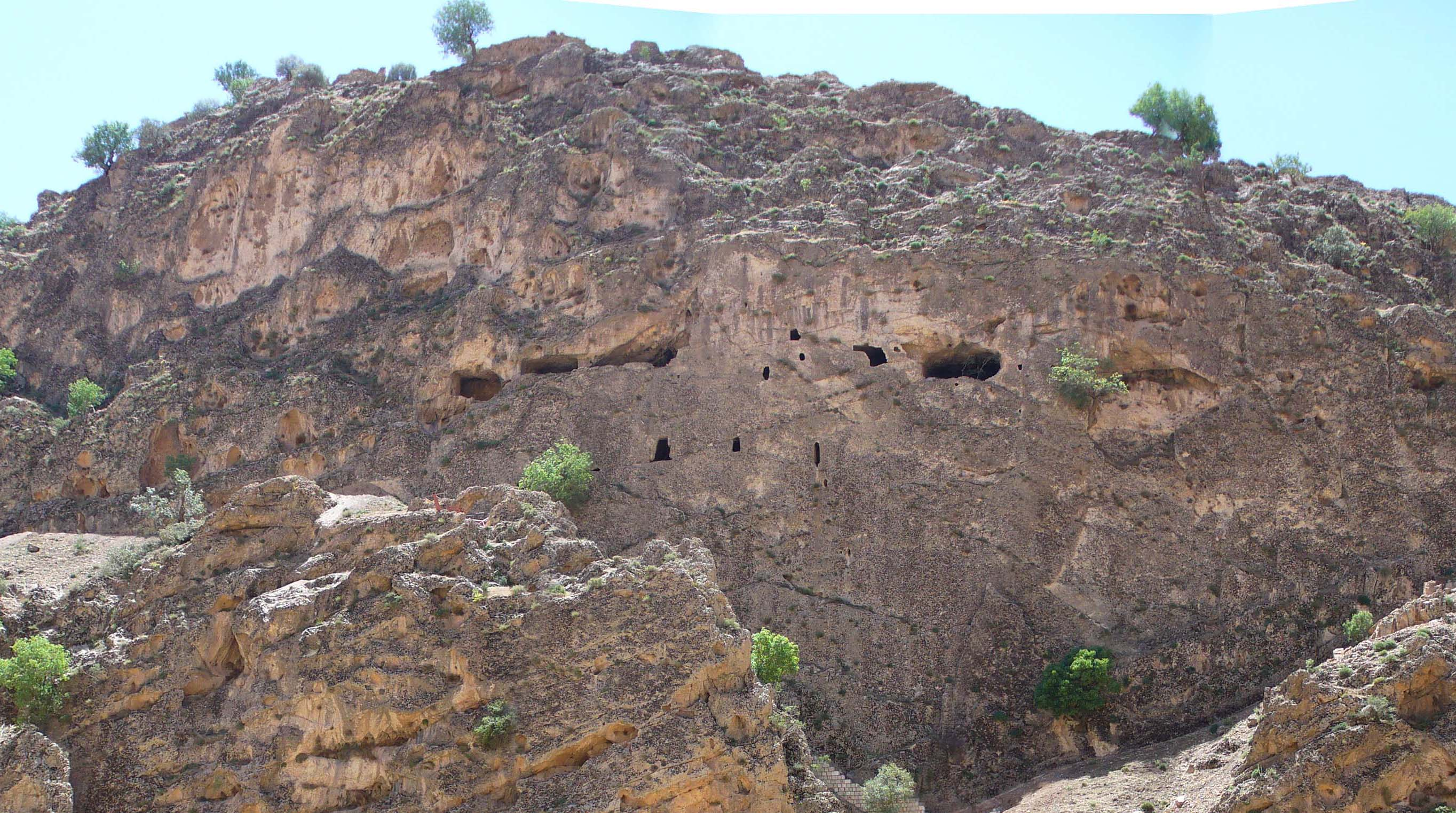
- Location: Pol-e Dokhtar County, Lorestan province, Iran
- Difficulty: Moderate
- Access: Public

Kogan Cave (Persian: غار کوگان) is a Parthian era two-story rock dwelling or stone temple in Pol-e Dokhtar County, Lorestan province, Iran. It is located east of the city of Pol-e Dokhtar, and south of Khorramabad. Newly built steps provide access to the site. The cave includes about 15 rooms and was likely used for watchkeeping, religious activities, and other purposes, with spaces for storing food and water.
