= Pol-e Dokhtar =

City in Lorestan province, Iran

Pol-e Dokhtar Persian: پلدختر
- City
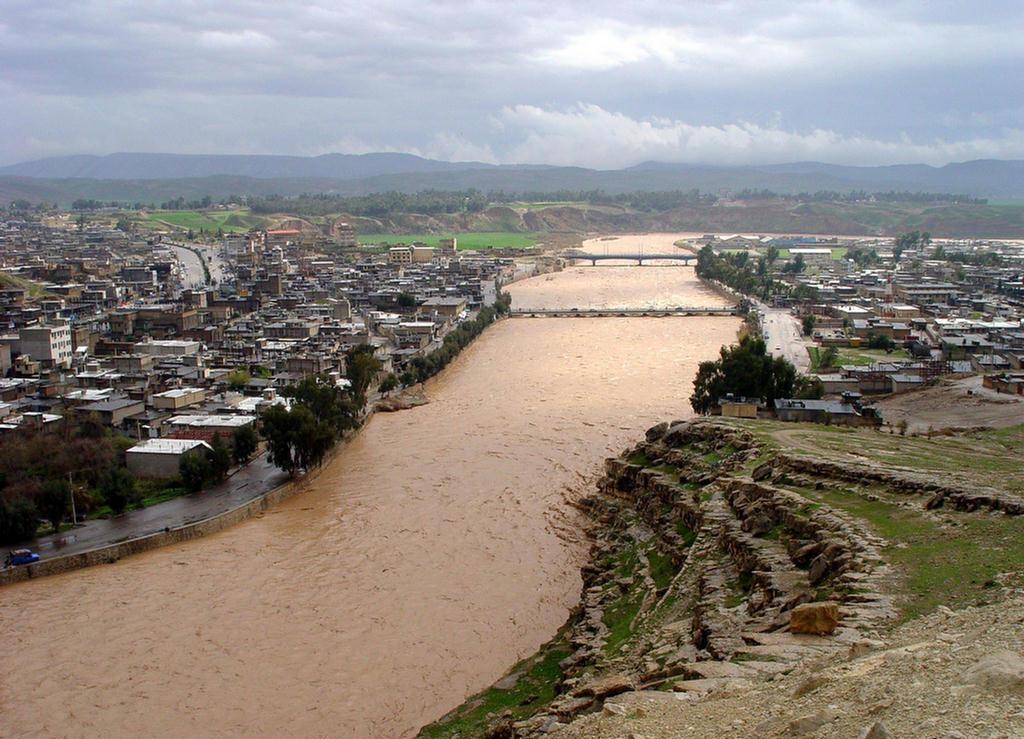

- Location within Iran
- Coordinates: 33°08′56″N 47°42′59″E
- Country: Iran
- Province: Lorestan
- County: Pol-e Dokhtar
- District: Central

Population (2016)
  - Total: 26,352
- Time zone: UTC+3:30 (IRST)
- Website: paalam.ir

Pol-e Dokhtar (Persian: پلدختر) (Note: Also romanized as Pol Dokhtar; also known as Pul-i-Dukhtar (English: Bridge of the Daughter)) is a city in the Central District of Pol-e Dokhtar County, Lorestan province, Iran, serving as capital of both the county and the district.

== Demographics ==
=== Population ===
At the time of the 2006 National Census, the city's population was 22,588 in 5,131 households. The following census in 2011 counted 25,092 people in 6,496 households. The 2016 census measured the population of the city as 26,352 people in 7,563 households.

== Geography ==
=== Location ===
Pol-e Dokhtar is approximately 100 kilometres from Khorramabad, the provincial capital. Just north of the city resides the remains of the ancient Pol-e Dokhtar Bridge, which, along with others in this area, has been submitted as a potential UNESCO World Heritage Site.

=== Climate ===
Pol-e Dokhtar has a hot semi-arid climate(BSh) in Köppen climate classification with precipitation being higher in winter months than summer. Summers are dry and severely hot with very little precipitation from June to September. Winters are cool and relatively wet. Compared to other cities in the province such as Aligudarz, Dorud and Khorramabad, Pol-e Dokhtar observes higher temperatures and lower precipitation.

Climate data for Pol-e Dokhtar
Month	Jan	Feb	Mar	Apr	May	Jun	Jul	Aug	Sep	Oct	Nov	Dec	Year
Daily mean °C (°F)	9.2 (48.6)	11.6 (52.9)	16.1 (61.0)	20.9 (69.6)	27.6 (81.7)	33.5 (92.3)	36.1 (97.0)	36.1 (97.0)	31.2 (88.2)	25.4 (77.7)	16.5 (61.7)	11.5 (52.7)	23.0 (73.4)
Average precipitation mm (inches)	63.4 (2.50)	47.9 (1.89)	49.9 (1.96)	53.4 (2.10)	10.1 (0.40)	0.2 (0.01)	0.5 (0.02)	1.0 (0.04)	1.5 (0.06)	19.1 (0.75)	50.7 (2.00)	71.3 (2.81)	369 (14.54)
Source: IRIMO(temperature), (precipitation)

== Historical monuments ==
=== Kalmakareh Cave ===
In 1989 a unique treasure in Kalmakareh Cave was discovered, according to Mehr News Agency; it can take into account the six treasures of the ancient world.

=== Kogan Cave ===
Kogan Cave is located in Ashkanian, eastern Pol-e Dokhtar city.

== See also ==
Media related to Pol-e Dokhtar at Wikimedia Commons
