= Kalmakareh Cave =

Iranian archeological site

Coordinates: 33.1953°N 47.6233°E

Kalmakareh/Kalmakre cave is a cave with historical importance in the northwest of Pol-e Dokhtar, Lorestan province, western Iran. Kalmakre means 'place of goat (mountain) and figs' in the local language.

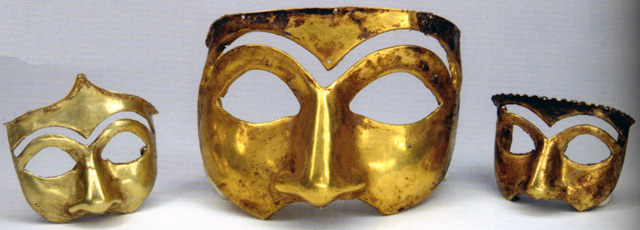
Golden masks excavated from the Kalmakareh Cave, first half of first Millennium BC, National Museum of Iran

The front of the cave is 50.1 metres (164 ft) ahead of the bottom of its opening, and for this reason, this cave is hidden from view. Kalmakareh was discovered by chance in 1989 by a hunter who was chasing a goat. He discovered a coin in the opening of Kalmakreh Cave, which is a long corridor leading to the main halls, which led to his curiosity and the discovery of the entire treasure. After some time, the Ministry of Cultural Heritage, Tourism and Handicrafts found out about the existence of such a cave and sent a group to protect it, but all the objects in this cave, which included coins, a number of silver sculptures of animal shapes, and silver cups, were stolen by people. Locals and smugglers had left the cave.
