= Cham-e Heydar, Kermanshah =

Cham-e Heydar چم حيدر
- Village
- Location within Iran
- Coordinates: 34°09′17″N 47°22′15″E
- Country: Iran
- Province: Kermanshah
- County: Harsin
- Bakhsh: Central
- Rural District: Cheshmeh Kabud

Population (2006)
  - Total: 64
- Time zone: UTC+3:30 (IRST)
  - Summer (DST): UTC+4:30 (IRDT)

Cham-e Heydar (Persian: چم حيدر, also Romanized as Cham-e Ḩeydar) is a village in Cheshmeh Kabud Rural District, in the Central District of Harsin County, Kermanshah Province, Iran. At the 2006 census, its population was 64, in 13 families.
