= Mamulan =

City in Lorestan province, Iran

Mamulan Persian: معمولان
- City
- Location within Iran
- Coordinates: 33°22′43″N 47°57′35″E
- Country: Iran
- Province: Lorestan
- County: Mamulan
- District: Central

Population (2016)
  - Total: 7,656
- Time zone: UTC+3:30 (IRST)

Mamulan (Persian: معمولان) (Note: Also romanized as Ma‘mūlān; also known as Māmūlūn) is a city in the Central District (Note: Formerly Mamulan District of Pol-e Dokhtar County) of Mamulan County, Lorestan province, Iran, serving as capital of both the county and the district. It also serves as the administrative center for Mamulan Rural District.

== Demographics ==
=== Population ===
At the time of the 2006 National Census, the city's population was 7,633 in 1,725 households, when it was in Mamulan District (Note: Renamed the Central District of Mamulan County) of Pol-e Dokhtar County. The following census in 2011 counted 7,502 people in 1,993 households. The 2016 census measured the population of the city as 7,656 people in 2,344 households.

In 2023, the district was separated from the county in the establishment of Mamulan County and renamed the Central District, with Mamulan as the new county's capital.

== Notable people ==
- Ebrahim Mirzapour (Iranian football goalkeeper)
