= Dul-e Gap, Khuzestan =

Dul-e Gap دول گپ
- Village
- Country: Iran
- Province: Khuzestan
- County: Dezful
- Bakhsh: Sardasht
- Rural District: Seyyedvaliyeddin

Population (2006)
  - Total: 50
- Time zone: UTC+3:30 (IRST)
  - Summer (DST): UTC+4:30 (IRDT)

Dul-e Gap (Persian: دول گپ, also Romanized as Dūl-e Gap) is a village in Seyyedvaliyeddin Rural District, Sardasht District, Dezful County, Khuzestan Province, Iran. At the 2006 census, nine families resided in the village, with a total population of 50.
