= Cham Qabrestan, Selseleh =

Cham Qabrestan چم قبرستان
- Village
- Location within Iran
- Coordinates: 33°47′38″N 47°54′13″E
- Country: Iran
- Province: Lorestan
- County: Selseleh
- Bakhsh: Firuzabad
- Rural District: Qalayi

Population (2006)
  - Total: 93
- Time zone: UTC+3:30 (IRST)
  - Summer (DST): UTC+4:30 (IRDT)

Cham Qabrestan (Persian: چم قبرستان, also Romanized as Cham Qabrestān) is a village in Qalayi Rural District, Firuzabad District, Selseleh County, Lorestan Province, Iran. At the 2006 census, its population was 93, in 18 families.
