= Dehliz =

Dehliz دهليز
- Village
- Location within Iran
- Coordinates: 31°21′30″N 48°29′42″E
- Country: Iran
- Province: Khuzestan
- County: Ahvaz
- Bakhsh: Hamidiyeh
- Rural District: Jahad

Population (2006)
  - Total: 87
- Time zone: UTC+3:30 (IRST)
  - Summer (DST): UTC+4:30 (IRDT)

Dehliz (Persian: دهليز, also Romanized as Dehlīz; also known as Dehlīz-e Yek) is a village in Jahad Rural District, Hamidiyeh District, Ahvaz County, Khuzestan Province, Iran. At the 2006 census, its population was 87, in 15 families.
