= Afrineh Rural District =

Rural district in Lorestan province, Iran

Afrineh Rural District Persian: دهستان افرينه
- Rural District
- Location within Iran
- Coordinates: 33°19′N 47°53′E
- Country: Iran
- Province: Lorestan
- County: Mamulan
- District: Afrineh
- Established: 1987
- Capital: Afrineh

Population (2016)
  - Total: 6,893
- Time zone: UTC+3:30 (IRST)

Afrineh Rural District (Persian: دهستان افرينه) is in Afrineh District of Mamulan County, Lorestan province, Iran. Its capital is the village of Afrineh.

== Demographics ==
=== Population ===
At the time of the 2006 National Census, the rural district's population (as a part of Mamulan District (Note: Renamed the Central District of Mamulan County) in Pol-e Dokhtar County) was 7,576 in 1,559 households. There were 7,090 inhabitants in 1,775 households at the following census of 2011. The 2016 census measured the population of the rural district as 6,893 in 1,931 households. The most populous of its 56 villages was Afrineh, with 1,944 people.

In 2023, the district was separated from the county in the establishment of Mamulan County and renamed the Central District. The rural district was transferred to the new Afrineh District.

=== Other villages in the rural district ===
- Ahmadabad
- Alishah
- Anarrud-e Bozorg
- Asad Koshteh
- Asemandul
- Bagh-e Bisheh
- Bakhshivand
- Bar Aftab-e Ghazal
- Bisheh Zardeh
- Bon Abbas Gol Bag Mir
- Bon Abbas-e Mehdi
- Cham Borreh
- Cham Qabrestan
- Cham Qamar
- Cham-e Murt
- Cheshmeh Sorkheh Mohammadi
- Cheshmeh Sorkheh Seyyed Reza
- Dadagolab
- Dar Aghol Begir-e Latif
- Dar Gel-e Kheyrali
- Dardamel-e Hoseynali
- Darsafeh
- Dehlich
- Dul Gaz-e Rajabali
- Gach Keykhah
- Kahzadvand
- Kapargah-e Alireza
- Kapargah-e Aqa Hoseyn
- Khalil Akbar
- Latvand-e Baraftab
- Mehdi Khan
- Meleh-ye Posht-e Sar Takht
- Mirzajan
- Nur Alivan Kar
- Nuzi Shahsavarvand
- Panbeh Kar
- Papi Ahmad
- Pol-e Eshkeneh
- Posht Tang-e Kordali
- Qaleh Nasir
- Rahmatabad
- Sar Takht-e Qadam Kheyr
- Sarab-e Abd ol Ali
- Taq Rezaleh-ye Mohammad Aqa
- Vareh Zardi
