= Afrineh District =

District in Lorestan province, Iran

Afrineh District Persian: بخش افرینه
- District
- Location within Iran
- Coordinates: 33°19′N 47°53′E
- Country: Iran
- Province: Lorestan
- County: Mamulan
- Established: 2023
- Capital: Afrineh
- Time zone: UTC+3:30 (IRST)

Afrineh District (Persian: بخش افرینه) is in Mamulan County of Lorestan province, Iran. Its capital is the village of Afrineh, whose population at the time of the 2016 National Census was 1,944 people in 555 households.

== History ==
In 2023, Mamulan District (Note: Renamed the Central District of Mamulan County) was separated from Pol-e Dokhtar County in the establishment of Mamulan County and renamed the Central District. The new county was divided into two districts of two rural districts each, with Mamulan as its capital and only city at the time. Afrineh and Miyankuh-e Sharqi Rural Districts were separated from the district in the formation of Afrineh District.

== Demographics ==
=== Administrative divisions ===
Afrineh District
Administrative Divisions
Afrineh RD
Miyankuh-e Sharqi RD
RD = Rural District
