= Central District (Mamulan County) =

District in Lorestan province, Iran

Central District (Mamulan County) Persian: بخش مرکزی شهرستان معمولان
- District
- Location within Iran
- Coordinates: 33°21′N 47°57′E
- Country: Iran
- Province: Lorestan
- County: Mamulan
- Established: 1995
- Capital: Mamulan

Population (2016)
  - Total: 21,372
- Time zone: UTC+3:30 (IRST)

The Central District of Mamulan County (Persian: بخش مرکزی شهرستان معمولان) (Note: Formerly Mamulan District (بخش معمولان) of Pol-e Dokhtar County) is in Lorestan province, Iran. Its capital is the city of Mamulan.

== History ==
In 2023, Mamulan District (Note: Renamed the Central District of Mamulan County) was separated from Pol-e Dokhtar County in the establishment of Mamulan County and renamed the Central District. The new county was divided into two districts of two rural districts each, with Mamulan as its capital and only city at the time. Zivdar Rural District was created in the district, and Afrineh and Miyankuh-e Sharqi Rural Districts were separated from it in the formation of Afrineh District.

== Demographics ==
=== Population ===
At the time of the 2006 National Census, the district's population (as Mamulan District in Pol-e Dokhtar County) was 23,941 in 5,176 households. The following census in 2011 counted 22,583 people in 5,843 households. The 2016 census measured the population of the district as 21,372 inhabitants in 6,248 households.

=== Administrative divisions ===
Central District (Mamulan County) Population (Note: As Mamulan District of Pol-e Dokhtar County at the 2006, 2011, and 2016 censuses)
Administrative Divisions	2006	2011	2016
Afrineh RD (Note: Transferred to Afrineh District after county establishment)	7,576	7,090	6,893
Mamulan RD	3,825	3,741	3,077
Miyankuh-e Sharqi RD	4,907	4,250	3,746
Zivdar RD (Note: Created after county establishment)			
Mamulan (city)	7,633	7,502	7,656
Total	23,941	22,583	21,372
RD = Rural District
