= Mamulan County =

County in Lorestan province, Iran

Mamulan County Persian: شهرستان معمولان
- County
- Location of Mamulan County in Lorestan province (bottom, yellow)

- Location of Lorestan province in Iran
- Coordinates: 33°16′N 48°03′E
- Country: Iran
- Province: Lorestan
- Established: 2023
- Capital: Mamulan
- Districts: Central, Afrineh
- Time zone: UTC+3:30 (IRST)

Mamulan County (Persian: شهرستان معمولان) is in Lorestan province, Iran. Its capital is the city of Mamulan, whose population at the time of the 2016 National Census was 7,656 people in 2,344 households.

== History ==
In 2023, Mamulan District (Note: Renamed the Central District of Mamulan County) was separated from Pol-e Dokhtar County in the establishment of Mamulan County and renamed the Central District. The new county was divided into two districts of two rural districts each, with Mamulan as its capital and only city.

== Demographics ==
=== Administrative divisions ===
Mamulan County's administrative structure is shown in the following table.

Mamulan County
Administrative Divisions
Central District (Note: Formerly Mamulan District of Pol-e Dokhtar County)
Mamulan RD
Zivdar RD
Mamulan (city)
Afrineh District
Afrineh RD
Miyankuh-e Sharqi RD
RD = Rural District
