= Pol-e Dokhtar County =

County in Lorestan province, Iran

Pol-e Dokhtar County Persian: شهرستان پلدختر
- County
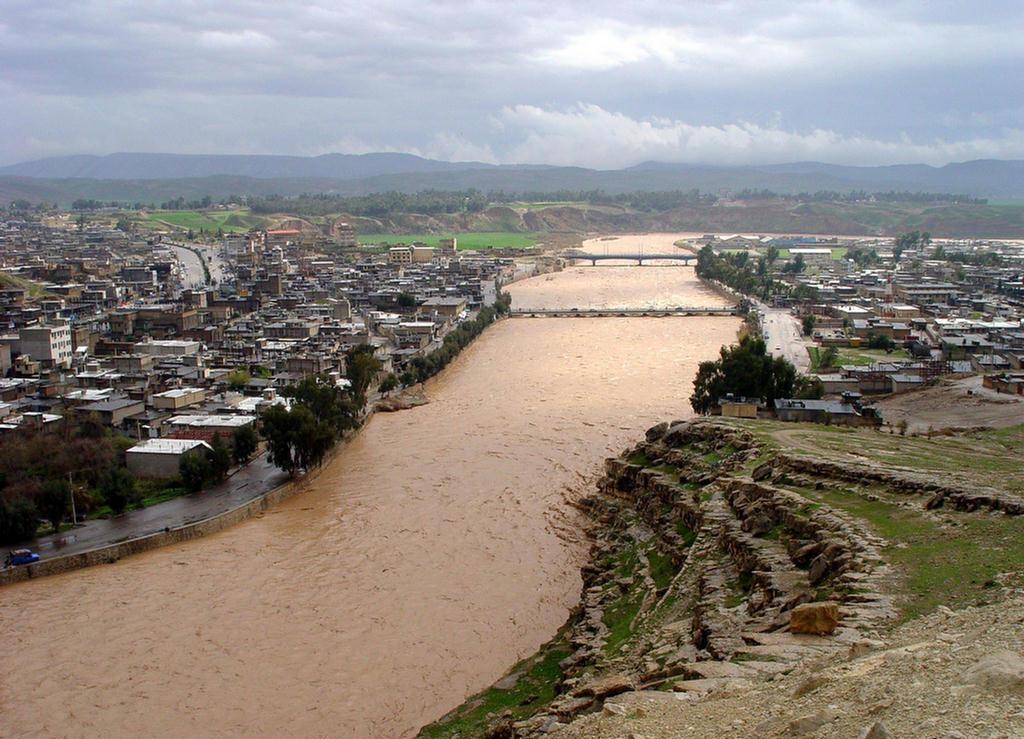
- Landscape in Pol-e Dokhtar County

- Location of Pol-e Dokhtar County in Lorestan province (bottom, purple)

- Location of Lorestan province in Iran
- Coordinates: 33°08′N 47°59′E
- Country: Iran
- Province: Lorestan
- Established: 1994
- Capital: Pol-e Dokhtar
- Districts: Central, Bala Geriveh

Population (2016)
  - Total: 73,744
- Time zone: UTC+3:30 (IRST)

Pol-e Dokhtar County (Persian: شهرستان پلدختر) is in Lorestan province, Iran. Its capital is the city of Pol-e Dokhtar.

== History ==
The village of Sarab Hammam was converted to a city in 2020.

In 2023, Mamulan District (Note: Renamed the Central District of Mamulan County) was separated from the county in the establishment of Mamulan County and renamed the Central District. At the same time, Jelogir Rural District was separated from Pol-e Dokhtar County's Central District in the formation of Bala Geriveh District, including the new Jayedar-e Jonubi Rural District.

== Demographics ==
=== Population ===
At the time of the 2006 National Census, the county's population was 74,537 in 16,278 households. The following census in 2011 counted 75,327 people in 19,276 households. The 2016 census measured the population of the county as 73,744 in 21,303 households.

=== Administrative divisions ===
Pol-e Dokhtar County's population history and administrative structure over three consecutive censuses are shown in the following table.

Pol-e Dokhtar County Population
Administrative Divisions	2006	2011	2016
Central District	50,596	52,382	51,974
Jayedar-e Shomali RD (Note: Formerly Jayedar Rural District)	10,727	10,388	10,803
Jelogir RD	5,368	4,999	3,896
Malavi RD	8,923	8,692	8,489
Miyankuh-e Gharbi RD	2,990	3,211	2,434
Pol-e Dokhtar (city)	22,588	25,092	26,352
Sarab Hammam (city) (Note: Became a city after the 2016 census)			
Bala Geriveh District (Note: Established after the 2016 census)			
Jayedar-e Jonubi RD			
Jelogir RD			
Mamulan District (Note: Transferred to Mamulan County after the 2016 census and renamed the Central District)	23,941	22,583	21,372
Afrineh RD	7,576	7,090	6,893
Mamulan RD	3,825	3,741	3,077
Miyankuh-e Sharqi RD	4,907	4,250	3,746
Mamulan (city)	7,633	7,502	7,656
Total	74,537	75,327	73,744
RD = Rural District

== See also ==
- Kogan Cave

Media related to Pol-e Dokhtar County at Wikimedia Commons
