= Shiravand =

Shiravand or Shir Avand (Persian: شيراوند) may refer to:

Places in Iran

- Shiravand, Hamadan, Hamadan Province
- Shiravand, Ilam, Ilam Province
- Shiravand, Rumeshkhan, in Rumeshkhan County, Lorestan Province
- Shiravand, Selseleh, in Selseleh County, Lorestan Province
- Keryeh-ye Abdolah Shiravand, Dowreh County, Lorestan Province
- Shiravand Gandabeh, Kuhdasht County, Lorestan Province
- Shiravand Naveh, Kuhdasht County, Lorestan Province
- Shiravand-e Olya, Kuhdasht County, Lorestan Province
- Shiravand-e Sofla, Kuhdasht County, Lorestan Province
