= Musaabad =

Musaabad or Moosa Abad or Musiabad or Musi Abad or Musa Abad (Persian: موسي اباد) may refer to:

== Chaharmahal and Bakhtiari Province ==
- Musaabad, Kiar, a village in Kiar County
- Musaabad, Kuhrang, a village in Kuhrang County

== Hamadan Province ==
- Musaabad, Asadabad, a village in Asadabad County
- Musaabad, Nahavand, a village in Nahavand County

== Isfahan Province ==
- Musaabad, Dehaqan, a village in Dehaqan County
- Musaabad, Isfahan, a village in Isfahan County
- Musaabad, Nain, a village in Nain County
- Musaabad Rural District, in Dehaqan County

== Kerman Province ==
- Musaabad, Rafsanjan, a village in Rafsanjan County
- Musaabad, Rigan, a village in Rigan County

== Lorestan Province ==
- Musaabad-e Olya, a village in Kuhdasht County
- Musaabad-e Sofla, a village in Kuhdasht County
- Musaabad (33°49′ N 48°13′ E), Selseleh, a village in Selseleh County
- Musaabad (33°51′ N 48°13′ E), Selseleh, a village in Selseleh County

== Markazi Province ==
- Musaabad, Ashtian, a village in Ashtian County
- Musaabad, Kharqan, a village in Zarandieh County
- Musaabad, Zarandieh, a village in Zarandieh County

== Mazandaran Province ==
- Musaabad, Mazandaran, a village in Nowshahr County

== Razavi Khorasan Province ==
- Musaabad, Chenaran, a village in Chenaran County
- Musaabad, Fariman, a village in Fariman County
- Musaabad, Torbat-e Jam, a village in Torbat-e Jam County

== Tehran Province ==
- Musaabad-e Bakhtiari, a village in Varamin County
- Musaabad-e Kashani, a village in Varamin County

== Yazd Province ==
- Musaabad, Yazd, a village in Meybod County
