= Shiravand, Lorestan =

Shiravand (Persian: شيراوند) may refer to the following places in Lorestan:

- Shiravand, Rumeshkhan
- Shiravand, Selseleh
- Keryeh-ye Abdolah Shiravand
- Shiravand Gandabeh
- Shiravand Naveh
- Shiravand-e Olya
- Shiravand-e Sofla
