= Musaabad-e Sofla =

Village in Lorestan province, Iran

Musaabad-e Sofla Persian: موسي ابادسفلي
- Village
- Location within Iran
- Coordinates: 33°18′51″N 47°25′45″E
- Country: Iran
- Province: Lorestan
- County: Rumeshkan
- District: Suri
- Rural District: Rumiani

Population (2016)
  - Total: 583
- Time zone: UTC+3:30 (IRST)

Musaabad-e Sofla (Persian: موسي ابادسفلي) (Note: Also romanized as Mūsáābād-e Soflá) is a village in Rumiani Rural District of Suri District in Rumeshkan County, Lorestan province, Iran. It is north of both Padarvand-e Pain and Padarvand-e Bala, and northwest of Musaabad-e Olya.

== Demographics ==
=== Population ===
At the time of the 2006 National Census, the village's population was 492 in 102 households, when it was in Rumeshkan-e Gharbi Rural District of the former Rumeshkan District in Kuhdasht County. The following census in 2011 counted 539 people in 130 households. The 2016 census measured the population of the village as 583 people in 162 households, by which time the district had been separated from the county in the establishment of Rumeshkan County. The rural district was transferred to the new Suri District and renamed Suri Rural District. Musaabad-e Sofla was transferred to Rumiani Rural District created in the same district.
