= Khirdarar =

Village in Lorestan province, Iran

Khirdarar Persian: خيردرار
- Village
- Location within Iran
- Coordinates: 33°16′05″N 47°34′20″E
- Country: Iran
- Province: Lorestan
- County: Rumeshkan
- District: Central
- Rural District: Bazvand

Population (2016)
  - Total: 1,757
- Time zone: UTC+3:30 (IRST)

Khirdarar (Persian: خيردرار) (Note: Also romanized as Khīrdarār; also known as Dowrāhī-ye Bāzvand (دوراهی بازوند)) is a village in, and the capital of, Bazvand Rural District in the Central District of Rumeshkan County, Lorestan province, Iran. It lies northeast of the village of Bazvandi.

== Demographics ==
=== Population ===
At the time of the 2006 National Census, the village's population was 1,483 in 306 households, when it was in Rumeshkan-e Sharqi Rural District (Note: Renamed Rumeshkan Rural District) of the former Rumeshkan District in Kuhdasht County. The following census in 2011 counted 1,675 people in 422 households. The 2016 census measured the population of the village as 1,757 people in 498 households, by which time the district had been separated from the county in the establishment of Rumeshkan County. The rural district was transferred to the new Central District and renamed Rumeshkan Rural District. Khirdarar was transferred to Bazvand Rural District created in the same district, the most populous village in its rural district.
