= Nasarkhasiabad =

Village in Lorestan province, Iran

Nasarkhasiabad Persian: نسارخاصي اباد
- Village
- Location within Iran
- Coordinates: 33°18′32″N 47°24′38″E
- Country: Iran
- Province: Lorestan
- County: Rumeshkan
- District: Suri
- Rural District: Suri

Population (2016)
  - Total: 655
- Time zone: UTC+3:30 (IRST)

Nasarkhasiabad (Persian: نسارخاصي اباد) (Note: Also romanized as Nasārkhāṣīābād) is a village in Suri Rural District (Note: Formerly Rumeshkan-e Gharbi Rural District) of Suri District in Rumeshkan County, Lorestan province, Iran. It is between the villages of Azizabad to the northwest, and Padarvand-e Sofla to the southeast.

== Demographics ==
=== Population ===
At the time of the 2006 National Census, the village's population was 558 in 109 households, when it was in Rumeshkan-e Gharbi Rural District (Note: Renamed Suri Rural District) of the former Rumeshkan District in Kuhdasht County. The following census in 2011 counted 626 people in 148 households. The 2016 census measured the population of the village as 655 people in 193 households, by which time the district had been separated from the county in the establishment of Rumeshkan County. The rural district was transferred to the new Suri District and renamed Suri Rural District.
