= Nazar Alivand =

Village in Lorestan province, Iran

Nazar Alivand Persian: نظرعليوند
- Village
- Location within Iran
- Coordinates: 33°17′44″N 47°27′06″E
- Country: Iran
- Province: Lorestan
- County: Rumeshkan
- District: Suri
- Rural District: Rumiani

Population (2016)
  - Total: 1,178
- Time zone: UTC+3:30 (IRST)

Nazar Alivand (Persian: نظرعليوند) (Note: Also romanized as Naẓar ʿAlīvand; formerly known as Aliabad Nazar Alivand (عالي ابادنظرعليوند), also romanized as ʿĀlīābād Naẓar ʿAlīvand) is a village in Rumiani Rural District of Suri District in Rumeshkan County, Lorestan province, Iran.

== Demographics ==
=== Population ===
At the time of the 2006 National Census, the village's population, as Aliabad Nazar Alivand, was 1,175 in 255 households, when it was in Rumeshkan-e Sharqi Rural District (Note: Renamed Rumeshkan Rural District) of the former Rumeshkan District in Kuhdasht County. The following census in 2011 counted 1,211 people in 315 households, by which time the village was listed as Nazar Alivand. The 2016 census measured the population of the village as 1,178 people in 326 households, when the district had been separated from the county in the establishment of Rumeshkan County. The rural district was transferred to the new Central District and renamed Rumeshkan Rural District. Nazar Alivand was transferred to Rumiani Rural District created in the new Suri District.
