= Bazvandi =

Village in Lorestan province, Iran

Bazvandi Persian: بازوندي
- Village
- Location within Iran
- Coordinates: 33°15′53″N 47°33′10″E
- Country: Iran
- Province: Lorestan
- County: Rumeshkan
- District: Central
- Rural District: Bazvand

Population (2016)
  - Total: 1,474
- Time zone: UTC+3:30 (IRST)

Bazvandi (Persian: بازوندي) (Note: Also romanized as Bāzvandī; also known as Bāzvand and Bāzvand-e Aşl) is a village in Bazvand Rural District of the Central District in Rumeshkan County, Lorestan province, Iran. It is southeast of the village of Rashnudeh.

== Demographics ==
=== Population ===
At the time of the 2006 National Census, the village's population was 1,213 in 284 households, when it was in Rumeshkan-e Sharqi Rural District (Note: Renamed Rumeshkan Rural District) of the former Rumeshkan District in Kuhdasht County. The following census in 2011 counted 1,565 people in 401 households. The 2016 census measured the population of the village as 1,474 people in 418 households, by which time the district had been separated from the county in the establishment of Rumeshkan County. The rural district was transferred to the new Central District and renamed Rumeshkan Rural District. Bazvandi was transferred to Bazvand Rural District created in the same district.
