= Asadabad, Rumeshkan =

Village in Lorestan province, Iran

Asadabad Persian: اسداباد
- Village
- Location within Iran
- Coordinates: 33°18′52″N 47°23′51″E
- Country: Iran
- Province: Lorestan
- County: Rumeshkan
- District: Suri
- Rural District: Suri

Population (2016)
  - Total: 781
- Time zone: UTC+3:30 (IRST)

Asadabad (Persian: اسداباد) (Note: Also romanized as Asadābād; also known as Cheqā-ye Sabz and Chigha yi Sabz) is a village in Suri Rural District (Note: Formerly Rumeshkan-e Gharbi Rural District) of Suri District in Rumeshkan County, Lorestan province, Iran. It lies between the villages of Chogha Sabz-e Khoda Nazar to the northwest and Sefid Khani-ye Jadid to the southeast.

== Demographics ==
=== Population ===
At the time of the 2006 National Census, the village's population was 897 in 180 households, when it was in Rumeshkan-e Gharbi Rural District (Note: Renamed Suri Rural District) of the former Rumeshkan District in Kuhdasht County. The following census in 2011 counted 843 people in 220 households. The 2016 census measured the population of the village as 781 people in 220 households, by which time the district had been separated from the county in the establishment of Rumeshkan County. The rural district was transferred to the new Suri District and renamed Suri Rural District.
