= Mohammadabad-e Garavand =

Village in Lorestan province, Iran

Mohammadabad-e Garavand Persian: محمدابادگراوند
- Village
- Location within Iran
- Coordinates: 33°15′52″N 47°31′45″E
- Country: Iran
- Province: Lorestan
- County: Rumeshkan
- District: Central
- Rural District: Rumeshkan

Population (2016)
  - Total: 176
- Time zone: UTC+3:30 (IRST)

Mohammadabad-e Garavand (Persian: محمدابادگراوند) (Note: Also romanized as Moḩammadābād-e Garāvand; also known as Garāvand) is a village in Rumeshkan Rural District (Note: Formerly Rumeshkan-e Sharqi Rural District) of the Central District in Rumeshkan County, Lorestan province, Iran. It is 1.3 kilometres (0.8 mi) by road south of Rashnudeh.

== Demographics ==
=== Population ===
At the time of the 2006 National Census, the village's population was 212 in 52 households, when it was in Rumeshkan-e Sharqi Rural District (Note: Renamed Rumeshkan Rural District) of the former Rumeshkan District in Kuhdasht County. The following census in 2011 counted 168 people in 46 households. The 2016 census measured the population of the village as 176 people in 49 households, by which time the district had been separated from the county in the establishment of Rumeshkan County. The rural district was transferred to the new Central District and renamed Rumeshkan Rural District.
