= Rangin Ban, Rumeshkan =

Village in Lorestan province, Iran

Rangin Ban Persian: رنگين بان
- Village
- Location within Iran
- Coordinates: 33°16′04″N 47°32′43″E
- Country: Iran
- Province: Lorestan
- County: Rumeshkan
- District: Central
- Rural District: Bazvand

Population (2016)
  - Total: 1,748
- Time zone: UTC+3:30 (IRST)

Rangin Ban (Persian: رنگين بان) (Note: Also romanized as Rangīn Bān; also known as Rangīn Bān-e Bāzvand and Rangīn Bon) is a village in Bazvand Rural District of the Central District in Rumeshkan County, Lorestan province, Iran.

== Demographics ==
=== Population ===
At the time of the 2006 National Census, the village's population was 1,551 in 324 households, when it was in Rumeshkan-e Sharqi Rural District (Note: Renamed Rumeshkan Rural District) of the former Rumeshkan District in Kuhdasht County. The following census in 2011 counted 1,773 people in 439 households. The 2016 census measured the population of the village as 1,748 people in 493 households, by which time the district had been separated from the county in the establishment of Rumeshkan County. The rural district was transferred to the new Central District and renamed Rumeshkan Rural District. Rangin Ban was transferred to Bazvand Rural District created in the same district.
