= Chogha Sabz-e Khoda Nazar =

Village in Lorestan province, Iran

Chogha Sabz-e Khoda Nazar Persian: چغاسبزخدانظر
- Village
- Location within Iran
- Coordinates: 33°18′57″N 47°23′39″E
- Country: Iran
- Province: Lorestan
- County: Rumeshkan
- District: Suri
- Rural District: Suri

Population (2016)
  - Total: 398
- Time zone: UTC+3:30 (IRST)

Chogha Sabz-e Khoda Nazar (Persian: چغاسبزخدانظر) (Note: Also romanized as Choghā Sabz-e Khodā Naz̧ar; also known as Choghā Sabz, Choqā-ye Sabz, and Khodā Naz̧ar-e Choghā Sabz) is a village in Suri Rural District (Note: Formerly Rumeshkan-e Gharbi Rural District) of Suri District in Rumeshkan County, Lorestan province, Iran. It is between the villages of Towhid Suri to the northwest and Asadabad to the southeast.

== Demographics ==
=== Population ===
At the time of the 2006 National Census, the village's population was 496 in 100 households, when it was in Rumeshkan-e Gharbi Rural District (Note: Renamed Suri Rural District) of the former Rumeshkan District in Kuhdasht County. The following census in 2011 counted 421 people in 108 households. The 2016 census measured the population of the village as 398 people in 109 households, by which time the district had been separated from the county in the establishment of Rumeshkan County. The rural district was transferred to the new Suri District and renamed Suri Rural District.
