= Moradabad, Rumeshkan =

Village in Lorestan province, Iran

Moradabad Persian: مراداباد
- Village
- Location within Iran
- Coordinates: 33°17′54″N 47°26′01″E
- Country: Iran
- Province: Lorestan
- County: Rumeshkan
- District: Suri
- Rural District: Rumiani

Population (2016)
  - Total: 580
- Time zone: UTC+3:30 (IRST)

Moradabad (Persian: مراداباد) (Note: Also romanized as Morādābād; also known as Naz̧ar ‘Alīvand-e Morādābād) is a village in Rumiani Rural District of Suri District in Rumeshkan County, Lorestan province, Iran.

== Demographics ==
=== Population ===
At the time of the 2006 National Census, the village's population was 610 in 124 households, when it was in Rumeshkan-e Gharbi Rural District of the former Rumeshkan District in Kuhdasht County. The following census in 2011 counted 706 people in 173 households. The 2016 census measured the population of the village as 580 people in 158 households, by which time the district had been separated from the county in the establishment of Rumeshkan County. The rural district was transferred to the new Suri District and renamed Suri Rural District. Moradabad was transferred to Rumiani Rural District created in the same district.
