= Golestaneh, Rumeshkan =

Village in Lorestan province, Iran

Golestaneh Persian: گلستانه
- Village
- Location within Iran
- Country: Iran
- Province: Lorestan
- County: Rumeshkan
- District: Central
- Rural District: Bazvand

Population (2016)
  - Total: 1,293
- Time zone: UTC+3:30 (IRST)

Golestaneh (Persian: گلستانه) (Note: Also romanized as Golestāneh) is a village in Bazvand Rural District of the Central District in Rumeshkan County, Lorestan province, Iran.

== Demographics ==
=== Population ===
At the time of the 2006 National Census, the village's population was 1,008 in 227 households, when it was in Rumeshkan-e Sharqi Rural District (Note: Renamed Rumeshkan Rural District) of the former Rumeshkan District in Kuhdasht County. The following census in 2011 counted 1,299 people in 336 households. The 2016 census measured the population of the village as 1,293 people in 379 households, by which time the district had been separated from the county in the establishment of Rumeshkan County. The rural district was transferred to the new Central District and renamed Rumeshkan Rural District. Golestaneh was transferred to Bazvand Rural District created in the same district.
