= Aqajan, Lorestan =

Village in Lorestan province, Iran

Aqajan Persian: اقاجان
- Village
- Location within Iran
- Coordinates: 33°16′31″N 47°29′50″E
- Country: Iran
- Province: Lorestan
- County: Rumeshkan
- District: Central
- Rural District: Rumeshkan

Population (2016)
  - Total: 2,364
- Time zone: UTC+3:30 (IRST)

Aqajan (Persian: اقاجان) (Note: Also romanized as Āqājān; also known as Āqājānī) is a village in Rumeshkan Rural District (Note: Formerly Rumeshkan-e Sharqi Rural District) of the Central District in Rumeshkan County, Lorestan province, Iran. It is 1.2 kilometres (0.7 mi) southwest of the city of Chaqabol.

== Demographics ==
=== Population ===
At the time of the 2006 National Census, the village's population was 2,358 in 467 households, when it was in Rumeshkan-e Sharqi Rural District (Note: Renamed Rumeshkan Rural District) of the former Rumeshkan District in Kuhdasht County. The following census in 2011 counted 2,444 people in 582 households. The 2016 census measured the population of the village as 2,364 people in 644 households, by which time the district had been separated from the county in the establishment of Rumeshkan County. The rural district was transferred to the new Central District and renamed Rumeshkan Rural District. Aqajan was the most populous village in its rural district.
