= Kahriz Gizhian =

Village in Lorestan province, Iran

Kahriz Gizhian Persian: كهريزگيژيان
- Village
- Location within Iran
- Coordinates: 33°15′17″N 47°36′34″E
- Country: Iran
- Province: Lorestan
- County: Rumeshkan
- District: Central
- Rural District: Bazvand

Population (2016)
  - Total: 1,576
- Time zone: UTC+3:30 (IRST)

Kahriz Gizhian (Persian: كهريزگيژيان) (Note: Also romanized as Kahrīz Gīzhīān; also known as Kahrīz and Kahrīz Bāzvand) is a village in Bazvand Rural District of the Central District in Rumeshkan County, Lorestan province, Iran. It is about 1.4 kilometres (0.9 mi) southeast of the village of Abdal Beygi Mohammadi.

== Demographics ==
=== Population ===
At the time of the 2006 National Census, the village's population was 1,475 in 318 households, when it was in Rumeshkan-e Sharqi Rural District (Note: Renamed Rumeshkan Rural District) of the former Rumeshkan District in Kuhdasht County. The following census in 2011 counted 1,633 people in 394 households. The 2016 census measured the population of the village as 1,576 people in 461 households, by which time the district had been separated from the county in the establishment of Rumeshkan County. The rural district was transferred to the new Central District and renamed Rumeshkan Rural District. Kahriz Gizhian was transferred to Bazvand Rural District created in the same district.
