= Lalvand =

Village in Lorestan province, Iran

Lalvand Persian: لالوند
- Village
- Location within Iran
- Country: Iran
- Province: Lorestan
- County: Rumeshkan
- District: Central
- Rural District: Rumeshkan

Population (2016)
  - Total: 898
- Time zone: UTC+3:30 (IRST)

Lalvand (Persian: لالوند) (Note: Also romanized as Lālvand) is a village in Rumeshkan Rural District (Note: Formerly Rumeshkan-e Sharqi Rural District) of the Central District in Rumeshkan County, Lorestan province, Iran. It is between the town of Chaqabol to the northwest and the village of Rashnudeh to the southeast.

== Demographics ==
=== Population ===
At the time of the 2006 National Census, the village's population was 852 in 177 households, when it was in Rumeshkan-e Sharqi Rural District (Note: Renamed Rumeshkan Rural District) of the former Rumeshkan District in Kuhdasht County. The following census in 2011 counted 869 people in 223 households. The 2016 census measured the population of the village as 898 people in 248 households, by which time the district had been separated from the county in the establishment of Rumeshkan County. The rural district was transferred to the new Central District and renamed Rumeshkan Rural District.
