= Papiabad Kalivand =

Village in Lorestan province, Iran

Papiabad Kalivand Persian: پاپي ابادكليوند
- Village
- Country: Iran
- Province: Lorestan
- County: Rumeshkan
- District: Suri
- Rural District: Rumiani

Population (2016)
  - Total: 20
- Time zone: UTC+3:30 (IRST)

Papiabad Kalivand (Persian: پاپي ابادكليوند) (Note: Also romanized as Pāpīābād Kalīvand) is a village in Rumiani Rural District of Suri District in Rumeshkan County, Lorestan province, Iran.

== Demographics ==
=== Population ===
At the time of the 2006 National Census, the village's population was 56 in 11 households, when it was in Rumeshkan-e Gharbi Rural District of the former Rumeshkan District in Kuhdasht County. The following census in 2011 counted 46 people in nine households. The 2016 census measured the population of the village as 20 people in five households, by which time the district had been separated from the county in the establishment of Rumeshkan County. The rural district was transferred to the new Suri District and renamed Suri Rural District. Papiabad Kalivand was transferred to Rumiani Rural District created in the same district.
