= Rumiani =

Village in Lorestan province, Iran

Rumiani Persian: رومياني
- Village
- Location within Iran
- Coordinates: 33°17′31″N 47°27′56″E
- Country: Iran
- Province: Lorestan
- County: Rumeshkan
- District: Suri
- Rural District: Rumiani

Population (2016)
  - Total: 3,458
- Time zone: UTC+3:30 (IRST)

Rumiani (Persian: رومياني) (Note: Also romanized as Rūmīānī and Rūmīyānī) is a village in, and the capital of, Rumiani Rural District in Suri District of Rumeshkan County, Lorestan province, Iran.

== Demographics ==
=== Population ===
At the time of the 2006 National Census, the village's population was 3,360 in 691 households, when it was in Rumeshkan-e Sharqi Rural District (Note: Renamed Rumeshkan Rural District) of the former Rumeshkan District in Kuhdasht County. The following census in 2011 counted 3,837 people in 881 households. The 2016 census measured the population of the village as 3,458 people in 916 households, by which time the district had been separated from the county in the establishment of Rumeshkan County. The rural district was transferred to the new Central District and renamed Rumeshkan Rural District. Rumiani was transferred to Rumiani Rural District created in the new Suri District, the most populous village in its rural district.
