= Abdal Beygi Mohammadi =

Village in Lorestan province, Iran

Abdal Beygi Mohammadi Persian: عبدل بيگي محمدي
- Village
- Location within Iran
- Coordinates: 33°15′36″N 47°35′47″E
- Country: Iran
- Province: Lorestan
- County: Rumeshkan
- District: Central
- Rural District: Bazvand

Population (2016)
  - Total: 266
- Time zone: UTC+3:30 (IRST)

Abdal Beygi Mohammadi (Persian: عبدل بيگي محمدي) (Note: Also romanized as ‘Abdāl Beygī Moḥammadī; also known as ‘Abdāl Beygī, ‘Abdolbeygī, and Bāzvand Moḩammadī) is a village in Bazvand Rural District of the Central District in Rumeshkan County, Lorestan province, Iran. It is northeast of Kahriz Gizhian.

== Demographics ==
=== Population ===
At the time of the 2006 National Census, the village's population was 205 in 43 households, when it was in Rumeshkan-e Sharqi Rural District (Note: Renamed Rumeshkan Rural District) of the former Rumeshkan District in Kuhdasht County. The following census in 2011 counted 239 people in 60 households. The 2016 census measured the population of the village as 266 people in 78 households, by which time the district had been separated from the county in the establishment of Rumeshkan County. The rural district was transferred to the new Central District and renamed Rumeshkan Rural District. Abdal Beygi Mohammadi was transferred to Bazvand Rural District created in the same district.
