= Mahki =

Village in Lorestan province, Iran

Mahki Persian: مهكي
- Village
- Location within Iran
- Coordinates: 33°16′54″N 47°28′11″E
- Country: Iran
- Province: Lorestan
- County: Rumeshkan
- District: Central
- Rural District: Rumeshkan

Population (2016)
  - Total: 1,216
- Time zone: UTC+3:30 (IRST)

Mahki (Persian: مهكي) (Note: Also romanized as Mahkī) is a village in Rumeshkan Rural District (Note: Formerly Rumeshkan-e Sharqi Rural District) of the Central District in Rumeshkan County, Lorestan province, Iran. It is about a kilometer southwest of the village of Choqapur Aliabad.

== Demographics ==
=== Population ===
At the time of the 2006 National Census, the village's population was 1,205 in 223 households, when it was in Rumeshkan-e Sharqi Rural District (Note: Renamed Rumeshkan Rural District) of the former Rumeshkan District in Kuhdasht County. The following census in 2011 counted 1,252 people in 264 households. The 2016 census measured the population of the village as 1,216 people in 302 households, by which time the district had been separated from the county in the establishment of Rumeshkan County. The rural district was transferred to the new Central District and renamed Rumeshkan Rural District.
