= Padarvand-e Vosta =

Village in Lorestan province, Iran

Padarvand-e Vosta Persian: پادروندوسطي
- Village
- Location within Iran
- Coordinates: 33°18′02″N 47°25′37″E
- Country: Iran
- Province: Lorestan
- County: Rumeshkan
- District: Suri
- Rural District: Rumiani

Population (2016)
  - Total: 681
- Time zone: UTC+3:30 (IRST)

Padarvand-e Vosta (Persian: پادروندوسطي) (Note: Also romanized as Pādarvand-e Vosţá; also known as Bādervand-e Vosţá) is a village in Rumiani Rural District of Suri District in Rumeshkan County, Lorestan province, Iran.

== Demographics ==
=== Population ===
At the time of the 2006 National Census, the village's population was 560 in 104 households, when it was in Rumeshkan-e Gharbi Rural District of the former Rumeshkan District in Kuhdasht County. The following census in 2011 counted 554 people in 123 households. The 2016 census measured the population of the village as 681 people in 167 households, by which time the district had been separated from the county in the establishment of Rumeshkan County. The rural district was transferred to the new Suri District and renamed Suri Rural District. Padarvand-e Vosta was transferred to Rumiani Rural District created in the same district.
