= Ganjali =

Ganjali or Ganj Ali (Persian: گنج علي) may refer to:

- Ganjali, Ardabil
- Ganjali, Lorestan
- Ganjali-e Sofla, Lorestan Province
