= Musaabad-e Olya =

Village in Lorestan province, Iran

Musaabad-e Olya Persian: موسي ابادعليا
- Village
- Location within Iran
- Coordinates: 33°18′29″N 47°26′26″E
- Country: Iran
- Province: Lorestan
- County: Rumeshkan
- District: Suri
- Rural District: Rumiani

Population (2016)
  - Total: 709
- Time zone: UTC+3:30 (IRST)

Musaabad-e Olya (Persian: موسي ابادعليا) (Note: Also romanized as Mūsáābād-e ‘Olyā) is a village in Rumiani Rural District of Suri District in Rumeshkan County, Lorestan province, Iran. It is north-northeast of the village of Hoseynabad.

== Demographics ==
=== Population ===
At the time of the 2006 National Census, the village's population was 715 in 139 households, when it was in Rumeshkan-e Gharbi Rural District of the former Rumeshkan District in Kuhdasht County. The following census in 2011 counted 779 people in 185 households. The 2016 census measured the population of the village as 709 people in 178 households, by which time the district had been separated from the county in the establishment of Rumeshkan County. The rural district was transferred to the new Suri District and renamed Suri Rural District. Musaabad-e Olya was transferred to Rumiani Rural District created in the same district.
