= Ramavandi-ye Pain =

Village in Lorestan province, Iran

Ramavandi-ye Pain Persian: رماوندي پايين
- Village
- Location within Iran
- Coordinates: 33°15′21″N 47°15′19″E
- Country: Iran
- Province: Lorestan
- County: Rumeshkan
- District: Suri
- Rural District: Suri

Population (2016)
  - Total: 461
- Time zone: UTC+3:30 (IRST)

Ramavandi-ye Sofla (Persian: رماوندي سفلي) (Note: Also romanized as Ramāvandī-ye Soflá; also known as Ramāvand-e Soflá) is a village in Suri Rural District (Note: Formerly Rumeshkan-e Gharbi Rural District) of Suri District in Rumeshkan County, Lorestan province, Iran.

== Demographics ==
=== Population ===
At the time of the 2006 National Census, the village's population was 582 in 99 households, when it was in Rumeshkan-e Gharbi Rural District (Note: Renamed Suri Rural District) of the former Rumeshkan District in Kuhdasht County. The following census in 2011 counted 488 people in 101 households. The 2016 census measured the population of the village as 461 people in 121 households, by which time the district had been separated from the county in the establishment of Rumeshkan County. The rural district was transferred to the new Suri District and renamed Suri Rural District.
