= Padarvand =

Padarvand (پادروند) may refer to:

- Padarvand-e Olya
- Padarvand-e Sofla
- Padarvand-e Vosta
