= Choqapur Aliabad =

Village in Lorestan province, Iran

Choqapur Aliabad Persian: چقاپورعالي اباد
- Village
- Location within Iran
- Coordinates: 33°17′25″N 47°28′38″E
- Country: Iran
- Province: Lorestan
- County: Rumeshkan
- District: Central
- Rural District: Rumeshkan

Population (2016)
  - Total: 663
- Time zone: UTC+3:30 (IRST)

Choqapur Aliabad (Persian: چقاپورعالي اباد) (Note: Also romanized as Choqāpūr ʿĀlīābād) is a village in Rumeshkan Rural District (Note: Formerly Rumeshkan-e Sharqi Rural District) of the Central District in Rumeshkan County, Lorestan province, Iran. It is about a kilometer southeast of the village of Rumiani.

== Demographics ==
=== Population ===
At the time of the 2006 National Census, the village's population was 659 in 129 households, when it was in Rumeshkan-e Sharqi Rural District (Note: Renamed Rumeshkan Rural District) of the former Rumeshkan District in Kuhdasht County. The following census in 2011 counted 656 people in 150 households. The 2016 census measured the population of the village as 663 people in 191 households, by which time the district had been separated from the county in the establishment of Rumeshkan County. The rural district was transferred to the new Central District and renamed Rumeshkan Rural District.
