= Rahmanabad-e Zagheh-ye Lalvand =

Village in Lorestan province, Iran

Rahmanabad-e Zagheh-ye Lalvand Persian: رحمن ابادزاغه لال وند
- Village
- Location within Iran
- Coordinates: 33°16′47″N 47°31′00″E
- Country: Iran
- Province: Lorestan
- County: Rumeshkan
- District: Central
- Rural District: Rumeshkan

Population (2016)
  - Total: 833
- Time zone: UTC+3:30 (IRST)

Rahmanabad-e Zagheh-ye Lalvand (Persian: رحمن‌آباد زاغه لال‌وند) (Note: Also romanized as Raḩmānābād-e Zāgheh-ye Lālvand; also known as Raḩmān and Raḩmān-e Barkhvordārī) is a village in Rumeshkan Rural District (Note: Formerly Rumeshkan-e Sharqi Rural District) of the Central District in Rumeshkan County, Lorestan province, Iran.

== Demographics ==
=== Population ===
At the time of the 2006 National Census, the village's population was 673 in 138 households, when it was in Rumeshkan-e Sharqi Rural District (Note: Renamed Rumeshkan Rural District) of the former Rumeshkan District in Kuhdasht County. The following census in 2011 counted 775 people in 200 households. The 2016 census measured the population of the village as 833 people in 235 households, by which time the district had been separated from the county in the establishment of Rumeshkan County. The rural district was transferred to the new Central District and renamed Rumeshkan Rural District.
