= Cham Deylavand =

Cham Deylavand (Persian: چمديلاوند) may refer to:

- Cham Deylavand-e Olya
- Cham Deylavand-e Sofla
