= Asiavaleh, Lorestan =

Asiavaleh اسياوله
- Village
- Location within Iran
- Coordinates: 33°40′35″N 47°08′10″E
- Country: Iran
- Province: Lorestan
- County: Kuhdasht
- Bakhsh: Darb-e Gonbad
- Rural District: Darb-e Gonbad

Population (2006)
  - Total: 82
- Time zone: UTC+3:30 (IRST)
  - Summer (DST): UTC+4:30 (IRDT)

Asiavaleh (Persian: اسياوله, also Romanized as Āsīāvaleh and Āsīābaleh) is a village in Darb-e Gonbad Rural District, Darb-e Gonbad District, Kuhdasht County, Lorestan Province, Iran. At the 2006 census, its population was 82, in 14 families.
