= Ganj Aliabad =

Ganj Aliabad (Persian: گنج علی آباد) may refer to:

- Ganj Aliabad-e Olya
- Ganj Aliabad-e Sofla
