= Gombeleh =

Gombeleh گمبله
- Village
- Location within Iran
- Coordinates: 33°40′01″N 47°10′07″E
- Country: Iran
- Province: Lorestan
- County: Kuhdasht
- Bakhsh: Darb-e Gonbad
- Rural District: Darb-e Gonbad

Population (2006)
  - Total: 259
- Time zone: UTC+3:30 (IRST)
  - Summer (DST): UTC+4:30 (IRDT)

Gombeleh (Persian: گمبله, also Romanized as Gombelah, Gūmeleh, and Gomeleh) is a village in Darb-e Gonbad Rural District, Darb-e Gonbad District, Kuhdasht County, Lorestan Province, Iran. At the 2006 census, its population was 259, in 48 families.
