= Sefid Khani-ye Jadid =

Village in Lorestan province, Iran

Sefid Khani-ye Jadid Persian: سفيدخاني جديد
- Village
- Location within Iran
- Country: Iran
- Province: Lorestan
- County: Rumeshkan
- District: Suri
- Rural District: Suri

Population (2016)
  - Total: 223
- Time zone: UTC+3:30 (IRST)

Sefid Khani-ye Jadid (Persian: سفيدخاني جديد) (Note: Also romanized as Sefīd Khānī-ye Jadīd; also known as Qaryeh-ye Sefīd Khānī and Sefīd Khānī) is a village in Suri Rural District (Note: Formerly Rumeshkan-e Gharbi Rural District) of Suri District in Rumeshkan County, Lorestan province, Iran.

== Demographics ==
=== Population ===
At the time of the 2006 National Census, the village's population was 273 in 58 households, when it was in Rumeshkan-e Gharbi Rural District (Note: Renamed Suri Rural District) of the former Rumeshkan District in Kuhdasht County. The following census in 2011 counted 282 people in 73 households. The 2016 census measured the population of the village as 223 people in 62 households, by which time the district had been separated from the county in the establishment of Rumeshkan County. The rural district was transferred to the new Suri District and renamed Suri Rural District.
