= Rashnudeh =

Village in Lorestan province, Iran

Rashnudeh Persian: رشنوده
- Village
- Location within Iran
- Coordinates: 33°16′36″N 47°31′46″E
- Country: Iran
- Province: Lorestan
- County: Rumeshkan
- District: Central
- Rural District: Rumeshkan

Population (2016)
  - Total: 1,664
- Time zone: UTC+3:30 (IRST)

Rashnudeh (Persian: رشنوده) (Note: Also romanized as Rashnūdeh; also known as Rashnū, Rashnūdī, and Shanū) is a village in Rumeshkan Rural District (Note: Formerly Rumeshkan-e Sharqi Rural District) of the Central District in Rumeshkan County, Lorestan province, Iran. It is east-southeast of the city of Chaqabol, next to the village of Lalvand.

== Demographics ==
=== Population ===
At the time of the 2006 National Census, the village's population was 1,638 in 348 households, when it was in Rumeshkan-e Sharqi Rural District (Note: Renamed Rumeshkan Rural District) of the former Rumeshkan District in Kuhdasht County. The following census in 2011 counted 1,768 people in 425 households. The 2016 census measured the population of the village as 1,664 people in 461 households, by which time the district had been separated from the county in the establishment of Rumeshkan County. The rural district was transferred to the new Central District and renamed Rumeshkan Rural District.
