= Bareh Anar =

Bareh Anar بره انار
- Village
- Location within Iran
- Coordinates: 33°37′36″N 47°19′27″E
- Country: Iran
- Province: Lorestan
- County: Kuhdasht
- Bakhsh: Darb-e Gonbad
- Rural District: Boluran

Population (2006)
  - Total: 182
- Time zone: UTC+3:30 (IRST)
  - Summer (DST): UTC+4:30 (IRDT)

Bareh Anar (Persian: بره انار, also Romanized as Bareh Anār, Bareh-ye Anār, and Berah Anār; also known as Bara Anār, Bard Anār, and Bard-e Anār) is a village in Boluran Rural District, Darb-e Gonbad District, Kuhdasht County, Lorestan Province, Iran. At the 2006 census, its population was 182, in 32 families.
