= Azizabad, Rumeshkan =

Village in Lorestan province, Iran

Azizabad Persian: عزيزاباد
- Village
- Location within Iran
- Coordinates: 33°18′37″N 47°24′27″E
- Country: Iran
- Province: Lorestan
- County: Rumeshkan
- District: Suri
- Rural District: Suri

Population (2016)
  - Total: 684
- Time zone: UTC+3:30 (IRST)

Azizabad (Persian: عزيزاباد) (Note: Also romanized as ‘Azīzābād) is a village in Suri Rural District (Note: Formerly Rumeshkan-e Gharbi Rural District) of Suri District in Rumeshkan County, Lorestan province, Iran.

== Demographics ==
=== Population ===
At the time of the 2006 National Census, the village's population was 626 in 130 households, when it was in Rumeshkan-e Gharbi Rural District (Note: Renamed Suri Rural District) of the former Rumeshkan District in Kuhdasht County. The following census in 2011 counted 638 people in 154 households. The 2016 census measured the population of the village as 684 people in 191 households, by which time the district had been separated from the county in the establishment of Rumeshkan County. The rural district was transferred to the new Suri District and renamed Suri Rural District.
