= Baghelah =

Baghelah (Persian: باغله) may refer to various villages in Iran:

- Baghelah-ye Olya, Ilam
- Baghelah-ye Olya, Lorestan
- Baghelah-ye Sofla
