= Bareh-ye Seyyed Ahmad =

Bareh-ye Seyyed Ahmad بره سيداحمد
- Village
- Location within Iran
- Coordinates: 33°35′46″N 47°16′30″E
- Country: Iran
- Province: Lorestan
- County: Kuhdasht
- Bakhsh: Darb-e Gonbad
- Rural District: Boluran

Population (2006)
  - Total: 123
- Time zone: UTC+3:30 (IRST)
  - Summer (DST): UTC+4:30 (IRDT)

Bareh-ye Seyyed Ahmad (Persian: بره سيداحمد, also Romanized as Bareh-ye Şeyyed Aḩmad and Bara Saiyid Ahmed; also known as Bareh-ye Seyyed Aḩmad-e Maḩakī and Bard-e Seyyed Aḩmad) is a village in Boluran Rural District, Darb-e Gonbad District, Kuhdasht County, Lorestan Province, Iran. At the 2006 census, its population was 123, in 22 families.
