= Suri, Lorestan =

Village in Lorestan province, Iran

Suri Persian: سوري
- Village
- Location within Iran
- Coordinates: 33°19′57″N 47°22′38″E
- Country: Iran
- Province: Lorestan
- County: Rumeshkan
- District: Suri
- Rural District: Suri

Population (2016)
  - Total: 3,832
- Time zone: UTC+3:30 (IRST)

Suri (Persian: سوري) (Note: Also romanized as Sūrī; formerly Qātarch and Qāţerchī (قاطرچي); and Vali-ye Asr (ولي عصر), also romanized as Valī-ye ‘Aşr;) is a village in Suri Rural District (Note: Formerly Rumeshkan-e Gharbi Rural District) of Suri District in Rumeshkan County, Lorestan province, Iran, serving as capital of both the district and the rural district.

== Demographics ==
=== Population ===
At the time of the 2006 National Census, the village's population was 3,717 in 827 households, when it was in Rumeshkan-e Gharbi Rural District (Note: Renamed Suri Rural District) of the former Rumeshkan District in Kuhdasht County. The following census in 2011 counted 3,853 people in 258 households. The 2016 census measured the population of the village as 3,832 people in 1,109 households, by which time the district had been separated from the county in the establishment of Rumeshkan County. The rural district was transferred to the new Suri District and renamed Suri Rural District. Suri was the most populous village in its rural district.
