= Deylavand =

Deylavand (Persian: ديلاوند) may refer to:

- Deylavand-e Olya
- Deylavand-e Sofla
