= Garmeh Khani =

Garmeh Khani (Persian: گرمه خاني) may refer to:

- Garmeh Khani, Delfan, Lorestan Province, Iran
- Garmeh Khani, Kakavand, Lorestan Province, Iran
- Garmeh Khani, Kuhdasht, Lorestan Province, Iran
