= Charu Gereh =

Charu Gereh چروگره
- Village
- Location within Iran
- Coordinates: 33°39′22″N 47°03′37″E
- Country: Iran
- Province: Lorestan
- County: Kuhdasht
- Bakhsh: Darb-e Gonbad
- Rural District: Darb-e Gonbad

Population (2006)
  - Total: 181
- Time zone: UTC+3:30 (IRST)
  - Summer (DST): UTC+4:30 (IRDT)

Charu Gereh (Persian: چروگره, also Romanized as Charū Gereh; also known as Charū Dareh) is a village in Darb-e Gonbad Rural District, Darb-e Gonbad District, Kuhdasht County, Lorestan Province, Iran. At the 2006 census, its population was 181, in 38 families.
