= Darah Serah Bavineh =

Darah Serah Bavineh دارسره باوينه
- Village
- Location within Iran
- Coordinates: 33°40′00″N 47°07′00″E
- Country: Iran
- Province: Lorestan
- County: Kuhdasht
- Bakhsh: Darb-e Gonbad
- Rural District: Darb-e Gonbad

Population (2006)
  - Total: 136
- Time zone: UTC+3:30 (IRST)
  - Summer (DST): UTC+4:30 (IRDT)

Darah Serah Bavineh (Persian: دارسره باوينه, also Romanized as Dārah Serah Bāvīneh; also known as Dārah Serah) is a village in Darb-e Gonbad Rural District, Darb-e Gonbad District, Kuhdasht County, Lorestan Province, Iran. At the 2006 census, its population was 136, in 29 families.
