= Padarvand-e Bala =

Village in Lorestan province, Iran

Padarvand-e Bala Persian: پادروندبالا
- Village
- Location within Iran
- Coordinates: 33°17′54″N 47°26′01″E
- Country: Iran
- Province: Lorestan
- County: Rumeshkan
- District: Suri
- Rural District: Rumiani

Population (2016)
  - Total: 595
- Time zone: UTC+3:30 (IRST)

Padarvand-e Bala (Persian: پادروندبالا) (Note: Also romanized as Pādarvand-e Bālā; formerly known as Padarvand-e Olya (پادروندعليا), also romanized as Pādarvand-e ‘Olyā; also known as Bādervand-e ‘Olyā) is a village in Rumiani Rural District of Suri District in Rumeshkan County, Lorestan province, Iran.

== Demographics ==
=== Population ===
At the time of the 2006 National Census, the village's population, as Padarvand-e Olya, was 645 in 121 households, when it was in Rumeshkan-e Gharbi Rural District of the former Rumeshkan District in Kuhdasht County. The following census in 2011 counted 801 people in 172 households, by which time the village was listed as Padarvand-e Bala. The 2016 census measured the population of the village as 595 people in 159 households, when the district had been separated from the county in the establishment of Rumeshkan County. The rural district was transferred to the new Suri District and renamed Suri Rural District. Padarvand-e Bala was transferred to Rumiani Rural District created in the same district.
