= Bareh Sheykhali =

Bareh Sheykhali بره شيخ عالي
- Village
- Location within Iran
- Coordinates: 33°37′09″N 47°20′37″E
- Country: Iran
- Province: Lorestan
- County: Kuhdasht
- Bakhsh: Darb-e Gonbad
- Rural District: Boluran

Population (2006)
  - Total: 142
- Time zone: UTC+3:30 (IRST)
  - Summer (DST): UTC+4:30 (IRDT)

Bareh Sheykhali (Persian: بره شيخ عالي, also Romanized as Bareh Sheykh‘alī and Berah Sheykh‘alī) is a village in Boluran Rural District, Darb-e Gonbad District, Kuhdasht County, Lorestan Province, Iran. At the 2006 census, its population was 142, in 26 families.
