= Baghelah-ye Sofla =

Baghelah-ye Sofla باغله سفلي
- Village
- Location within Iran
- Coordinates: 33°40′11″N 47°06′24″E
- Country: Iran
- Province: Lorestan
- County: Kuhdasht
- Bakhsh: Darb-e Gonbad
- Rural District: Darb-e Gonbad

Population (2006)
  - Total: 220
- Time zone: UTC+3:30 (IRST)
  - Summer (DST): UTC+4:30 (IRDT)

Baghelah-ye Sofla (Persian: باغله سفلي, also Romanized as Bāghelah-ye Soflá and Bāghalah-ye Soflá; also known as Bāqālā) is a village in Darb-e Gonbad Rural District, Darb-e Gonbad District, Kuhdasht County, Lorestan Province, Iran. At the 2006 census, its population was 220, in 44 families.
