= Bareh Kalak =

Village in Lorestan province, Iran

Bareh Kalak Persian: بره كلك
- Village
- Location within Iran
- Coordinates: 33°38′36″N 47°17′41″E
- Country: Iran
- Province: Lorestan
- County: Kuhdasht
- District: Darb-e Gonbad
- Rural District: Boluran

Population (2016)
  - Total: 734
- Time zone: UTC+3:30 (IRST)

Bareh Kalak (Persian: بره كلك) (Note: Also romanized as Bareh Kalaḵ) is a village in Boluran Rural District of Darb-e Gonbad District in Kuhdasht County, Lorestan province, Iran.

== Demographics ==
=== Population ===
At the time of the 2006 National Census, the village's population was 1,205 in 251 households. The following census in 2011 counted 1,124 people in 268 households. The 2016 census measured the population of the village as 734 people in 203 households.
