= Shiravand, Rumeshkan =

Village in Lorestan province, Iran

Shiravand Persian: شيراوند
- Village
- Location within Iran
- Coordinates: 33°18′03″N 47°24′25″E
- Country: Iran
- Province: Lorestan
- County: Rumeshkan
- District: Suri
- Rural District: Suri

Population (2016)
  - Total: 250
- Time zone: UTC+3:30 (IRST)

Shiravand (Persian: شيراوند) (Note: Also romanized as Shīrāvand) is a village in Suri Rural District (Note: Formerly Rumeshkan-e Gharbi Rural District) of Suri District in Rumeshkan County, Lorestan province, Iran.

== Demographics ==
=== Population ===
At the time of the 2006 National Census, the village's population was 287 in 57 households, when it was in Rumeshkan-e Gharbi Rural District (Note: Renamed Suri Rural District) of the former Rumeshkan District in Kuhdasht County. The following census in 2011 counted 276 people in 66 households. The 2016 census measured the population of the village as 250 people in 67 households, by which time the district had been separated from the county in the establishment of Rumeshkan County. The rural district was transferred to the new Suri District and renamed Suri Rural District.
