= Bareh Tork =

Village in Lorestan province, Iran

Bareh Tork Persian: بره ترك
- Village
- Location within Iran
- Coordinates: 33°32′53″N 47°22′33″E
- Country: Iran
- Province: Lorestan
- County: Kuhdasht
- District: Darb-e Gonbad
- Rural District: Boluran

Population (2016)
  - Total: 96
- Time zone: UTC+3:30 (IRST)

Bareh Tork (Persian: بره ترك) (Note: Also romanized as Berah Tarak) is a village in Boluran Rural District of Darb-e Gonbad District in Kuhdasht County, Lorestan province, Iran.

== Demographics ==
=== Population ===
At the time of the 2006 National Census, the village's population was 161 in 32 households. The following census in 2011 counted 147 people in 30 households. The 2016 census measured the population of the village as 96 people in 25 households.
