= Bareh Kheyreh =

Village in Lorestan province, Iran

Bareh Kheyreh Persian: بره خيره
- Village
- Location within Iran
- Coordinates: 33°35′15″N 47°18′15″E
- Country: Iran
- Province: Lorestan
- County: Kuhdasht
- District: Darb-e Gonbad
- Rural District: Boluran

Population (2016)
  - Total: 166
- Time zone: UTC+3:30 (IRST)

Bareh Kheyreh (Persian: بره خيره) (Note: Also romanized as Bareh-ye Kheyreh and Berah Kheyreh; also known as Bara Khaireh, Bard-e Kheyreh, and Bare-Xeyre) is a village in Boluran Rural District of Darb-e Gonbad District in Kuhdasht County, Lorestan province, Iran.

== Demographics ==
=== Population ===
At the time of the 2006 National Census, the village's population was 153 in 33 households. The following census in 2011 counted 170 people in 40 households. The 2016 census measured the population of the village as 166 people in 46 households.
