= Kheyran Bareh =

Village in Lorestan province, Iran

Kheyran Bareh Persian: خيران بره
- Village
- Location within Iran
- Coordinates: 33°36′04″N 47°23′43″E
- Country: Iran
- Province: Lorestan
- County: Kuhdasht
- District: Darb-e Gonbad
- Rural District: Boluran

Population (2016)
  - Total: 185
- Time zone: UTC+3:30 (IRST)

Kheyran Bareh (Persian: خيران بره) (Note: Also romanized as Kheyrān Bareh; also known as Kheylāv Berah) is a village in Boluran Rural District of Darb-e Gonbad District in Kuhdasht County, Lorestan province, Iran.

== Demographics ==
=== Population ===
At the time of the 2006 National Census, the village's population was 296 in 53 households. The following census in 2011 counted 331 people in 70 households. The 2016 census measured the population of the village as 185 people in 53 households.
