= Towhid Suri =

Village in Lorestan province, Iran

Towhid Suri Persian: توحيدسوري
- Village
- Location within Iran
- Country: Iran
- Province: Lorestan
- County: Rumeshkan
- District: Suri
- Rural District: Suri

Population (2016)
  - Total: 143
- Time zone: UTC+3:30 (IRST)

Towhid Suri (Persian: توحيدسوري) (Note: Also romanized as Towḩīd Sūrī; also known as Towḩīd) is a village in Suri Rural District (Note: Formerly Rumeshkan-e Gharbi Rural District) of Suri District in Rumeshkan County, Lorestan province, Iran.

== Demographics ==
=== Population ===
At the time of the 2006 National Census, the village's population was 148 in 31 households, when it was in Rumeshkan-e Gharbi Rural District (Note: Renamed Suri Rural District) of the former Rumeshkan District in Kuhdasht County. The following census in 2011 counted 132 people in 33 households. The 2016 census measured the population of the village as 143 people in 44 households, by which time the district had been separated from the county in the establishment of Rumeshkan County. The rural district was transferred to the new Suri District and renamed Suri Rural District.
