= Cham Qaleh, Kuhdasht =

Village in Lorestan province, Iran

Cham Qaleh Persian: چم قلعه
- Village
- Location within Iran
- Coordinates: 33°43′52″N 47°17′17″E
- Country: Iran
- Province: Lorestan
- County: Kuhdasht
- District: Darb-e Gonbad
- Rural District: Darb-e Gonbad

Population (2016)
  - Total: 462
- Time zone: UTC+3:30 (IRST)

Cham Qaleh (Persian: چم قلعه) (Note: Also romanized as Cham Qal‘eh; also known as Jam-e Sangar (جم سنگر)) is a village in Darb-e Gonbad Rural District of Darb-e Gonbad District in Kuhdasht County, Lorestan province, Iran.

== Demographics ==
=== Population ===
At the time of the 2006 National Census, the village's population was 537 in 105 households. The following census in 2011 counted 590 people in 137 households. The 2016 census measured the population of the village as 462 people in 118 households.
