= Bareh Jula =

Village in Lorestan province, Iran

Bareh Jula Persian: بره جولا
- Village
- Location within Iran
- Coordinates: 33°33′37″N 47°20′52″E
- Country: Iran
- Province: Lorestan
- County: Kuhdasht
- District: Darb-e Gonbad
- Rural District: Boluran

Population (2016)
  - Total: 106
- Time zone: UTC+3:30 (IRST)

Bareh Jula (Persian: بره جولا) (Note: Also romanized as Bareh Jūlā and Berah Jūlā; also known as Barā Jūlā) is a village in Boluran Rural District of Darb-e Gonbad District in Kuhdasht County, Lorestan province, Iran.

== Demographics ==
=== Population ===
At the time of the 2006 National Census, the village's population was 114 in 21 households. The following census in 2011 counted 128 people in 31 households. The 2016 census measured the population of the village as 106 people in 25 households.
