= Cham Kushk-e Tulabi =

Village in Lorestan province, Iran

Cham Kushk-e Tulabi Persian: چم كوشك طولابي
- Village
- Location within Iran
- Coordinates: 33°41′20″N 47°04′20″E
- Country: Iran
- Province: Lorestan
- County: Kuhdasht
- District: Darb-e Gonbad
- Rural District: Darb-e Gonbad

Population (2016)
  - Total: 347
- Time zone: UTC+3:30 (IRST)

Cham Kushk-e Tulabi (Persian: چم كوشك طولابي) (Note: Also romanized as Cham Kūshk-e Ţūlābī) is a village in Darb-e Gonbad Rural District of Darb-e Gonbad District in Kuhdasht County, Lorestan province, Iran.

== Demographics ==
=== Population ===
At the time of the 2006 National Census, the village's population was 585 in 134 households. The following census in 2011 counted 535 people in 147 households. The 2016 census measured the population of the village as 347 people in 105 households.
