= Shor Shoreh, Kuhdasht =

Village in Lorestan province, Iran

Shor Shoreh Persian: شرشره
- Village
- Location within Iran
- Coordinates: 33°37′51″N 47°09′52″E
- Country: Iran
- Province: Lorestan
- County: Kuhdasht
- District: Darb-e Gonbad
- Rural District: Darb-e Gonbad

Population (2016)
  - Total: 589
- Time zone: UTC+3:30 (IRST)

Shor Shoreh (Persian: شرشره) (Note: Also known as Shur Shureh and Shūr Shūreh) is a village in Darb-e Gonbad Rural District of Darb-e Gonbad District in Kuhdasht County, Lorestan province, Iran.

== Demographics ==
=== Population ===
At the time of the 2006 National Census, the village's population was 710 in 141 households. The following census in 2011 counted 728 people in 191 households. The 2016 census measured the population of the village as 589 people in 169 households.
