= Bazvand Rural District =

Rural district in Lorestan province, Iran

Bazvand Rural District Persian: دهستان بازوند
- Rural District
- Location within Iran
- Coordinates: 33°16′N 47°35′E
- Country: Iran
- Province: Lorestan
- County: Rumeshkan
- District: Central
- Established: 2013
- Capital: Khirdarar

Population (2016)
  - Total: 8,114
- Time zone: UTC+3:30 (IRST)

Bazvand Rural District (Persian: دهستان بازوند) is in the Central District of Rumeshkan County, Lorestan province, Iran. Its capital is the village of Khirdarar.

== History ==
There is a Bronze Age mound in the district, that is registered as a national monument.

In 2013, Rumeshkan District was separated from Kuhdasht County in the establishment of Rumeshkan County, and Bazvand Rural District was created in the new Central District.

== Demographics ==
=== Population ===
At the time of the 2016 National Census, the rural district's population was 8,114 in 2,327 households. The most populous of its six villages was Khirdarar, with 1,757 people.

== Economy ==
The area is primarily agricultural, with herding and cereal crops. Water is from wells. The villagers also produce handicrafts which bring in additional income.

=== Other villages in the rural district ===
- Abdal Beygi Mohammadi
- Bazvandi
- Golestaneh
- Kahriz Gizhian
- Rangin Ban
