= Garmeh Khani, Kuhdasht =

Garmeh Khani گرمه خاني
- Village
- Location within Iran
- Coordinates: 33°40′20″N 47°04′23″E
- Country: Iran
- Province: Lorestan
- County: Kuhdasht
- Bakhsh: Darb-e Gonbad
- Rural District: Darb-e Gonbad

Population (2006)
  - Total: 293
- Time zone: UTC+3:30 (IRST)
  - Summer (DST): UTC+4:30 (IRDT)

Garmeh Khani (Persian: گرمه خاني, also Romanized as Garmeh Khānī) is a village in Darb-e Gonbad Rural District, Darb-e Gonbad District, Kuhdasht County, Lorestan Province, Iran. At the 2006 census, its population was 293, in 59 families.
