= Rumiani Rural District =

Rural district in Lorestan province, Iran

Rumiani Rural District Persian: دهستان رومياني
- Rural District
- Location within Iran
- Coordinates: 33°16′N 47°26′E
- Country: Iran
- Province: Lorestan
- County: Rumeshkan
- District: Suri
- Established: 2013
- Capital: Rumiani

Population (2016)
  - Total: 8,992
- Time zone: UTC+3:30 (IRST)

Rumiani Rural District (Persian: دهستان رومياني) is in Suri District of Rumeshkan County, Lorestan province, Iran. Its capital is the village of Rumiani.

== History ==
In 2013, Rumeshkan District was separated from Kuhdasht County in the establishment of Rumeshkan County, and Rumiani Rural District was created in the new Suri District.

== Demographics ==
=== Population ===
At the time of the 2016 National Census, the rural district's population was 8,992 in 2,396 households. The most populous of its 10 villages was Rumiani, with 3,458 people.

=== Other villages in the rural district ===
- Hoseynabad
- Moradabad
- Musaabad-e Olya
- Musaabad-e Sofla
- Nazar Alivand
- Padarvand-e Bala
- Padarvand-e Pain
- Padarvand-e Vosta
- Papiabad Kalivand
