= Towhid (disambiguation) =

Towhid is a city in Ilam province, Iran.

Towhid (Persian: توحيد) may also refer to:

- Tawhid, monotheism in Islam
- Towhid, Golestan
- Towhid, Lorestan
- Towhid, Tehran
- Shahrak-e Towhid
