= Padarvand-e Pain =

Village in Lorestan province, Iran

Padarvand-e Pain Persian: پادروندپايين
- Village
- Location within Iran
- Coordinates: 33°18′10″N 47°25′16″E
- Country: Iran
- Province: Lorestan
- County: Rumeshkan
- District: Suri
- Rural District: Rumiani

Population (2016)
  - Total: 811
- Time zone: UTC+3:30 (IRST)

Padarvand-e Pain (Persian: پادروندپايين) (Note: Also romanized as Pādarvand-e Pā’īn; formerly known as Padarvand-e Sofla (پادروندسفلي), also romanized as Pādarvand-e Soflá; also known as Bādervand-e Soflá and Pā Darband) is a village in Rumiani Rural District of Suri District in Rumeshkan County, Lorestan province, Iran.

== Demographics ==
=== Population ===
At the time of the 2006 National Census, the village's population, as Padarvand-e Sofla, was 714 in 139 households, when it was in Rumeshkan-e Gharbi Rural District of the former Rumeshkan District in Kuhdasht County. The following census in 2011 counted 793 people in 179 households, by which time the village was listed as Padarvand-e Pain. The 2016 census measured the population of the village as 811 people in 216 households, when the district had been separated from the county in the establishment of Rumeshkan County. The rural district was transferred to the new Suri District and renamed Suri Rural District. Padarvand-e Pain was transferred to Rumiani Rural District created in the same district.
