= Boluran =

Village in Lorestan province, Iran

Boluran Persian: بلوران
- Village
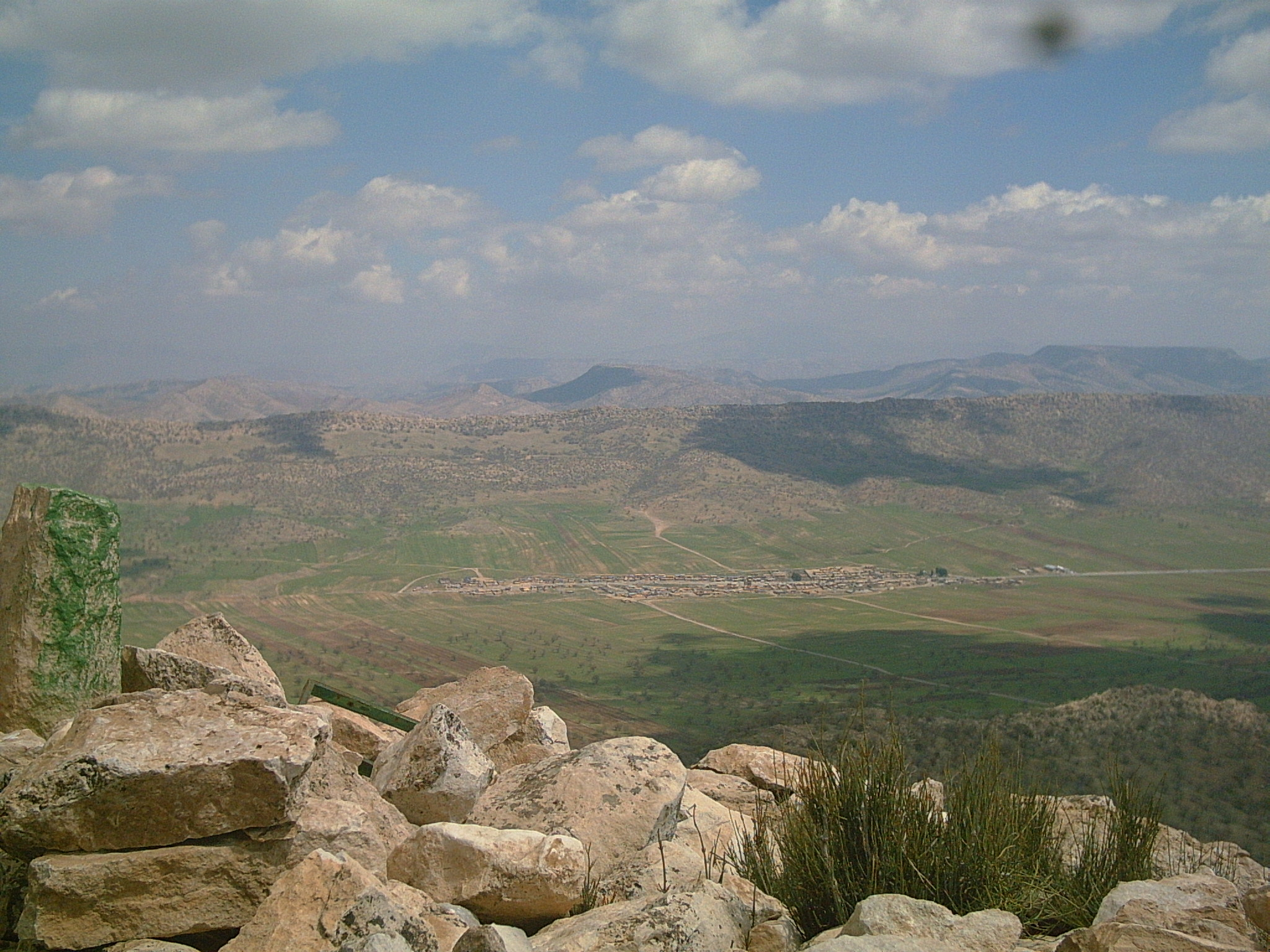
- Boluran village from the summit of Mount Boluran

- Location within Iran
- Coordinates: 33°33′23″N 47°18′03″E
- Country: Iran
- Province: Lorestan
- County: Kuhdasht
- District: Darb-e Gonbad
- Rural District: Boluran
- Elevation: 1,505 m (4,938 ft)

Population (2016)
  - Total: 742
- Time zone: UTC+3:30 (IRST)
- Area code: (+98) 066

Boluran (Persian: بلوران) (Note: Also romanized as Bolūrān) is a village in, and the capital of, Boluran Rural District in Darb-e Gonbad District of Kuhdasht County, Lorestan province, Iran. The village is located 35 km west of Kuhdasht. Boluran's residents speak Laki and the predominant religion is Yarsanism.

== Demographics ==
=== Population ===
At the time of the 2006 National Census, the village's population was 1,334 in 292 households. The following census in 2011 counted 947 people in 246 households. The 2016 census measured the population of the village as 742 people in 217 households, the most populous in its rural district.

== Boluran Forest Park ==
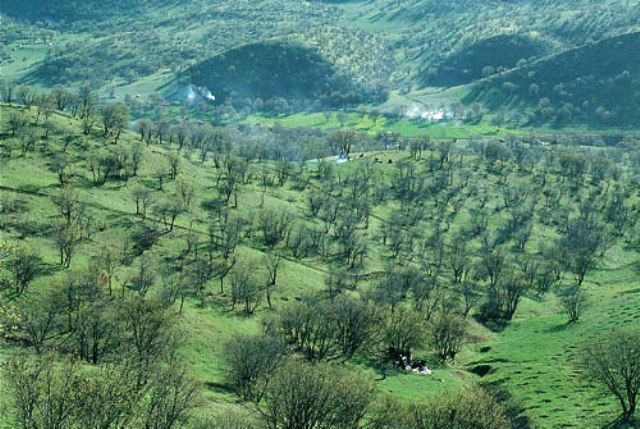
Boluran Forest Park

Boluran Forest Park is a park in Kuhdasht. The park suffered extensive forest fire damage. In 2016, a large fire raged for days, damaging hundreds of acres of land.

== Gallery ==
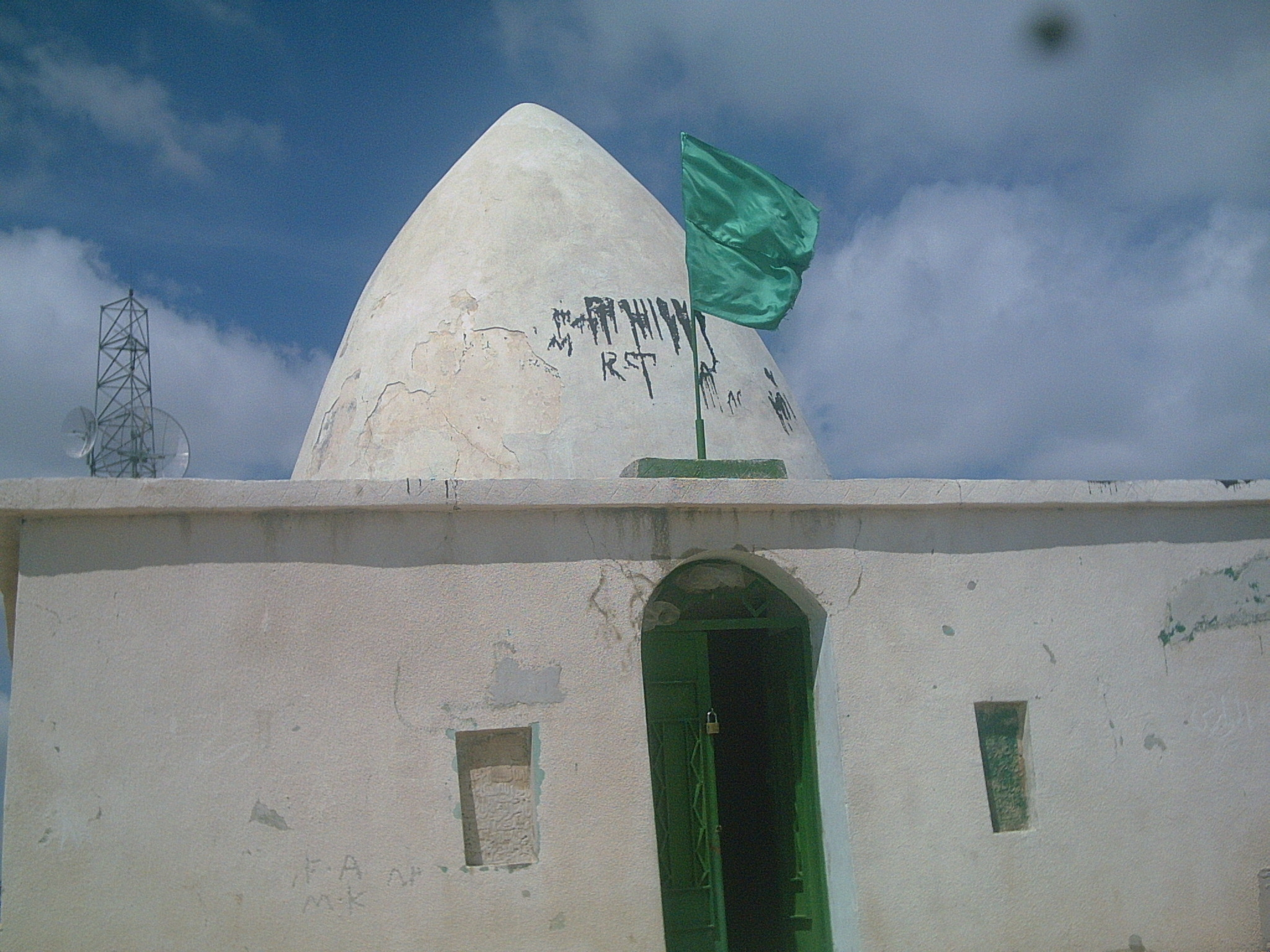
The Shrine of Agha Mirza Hossein (the summit of Boluran mountain).

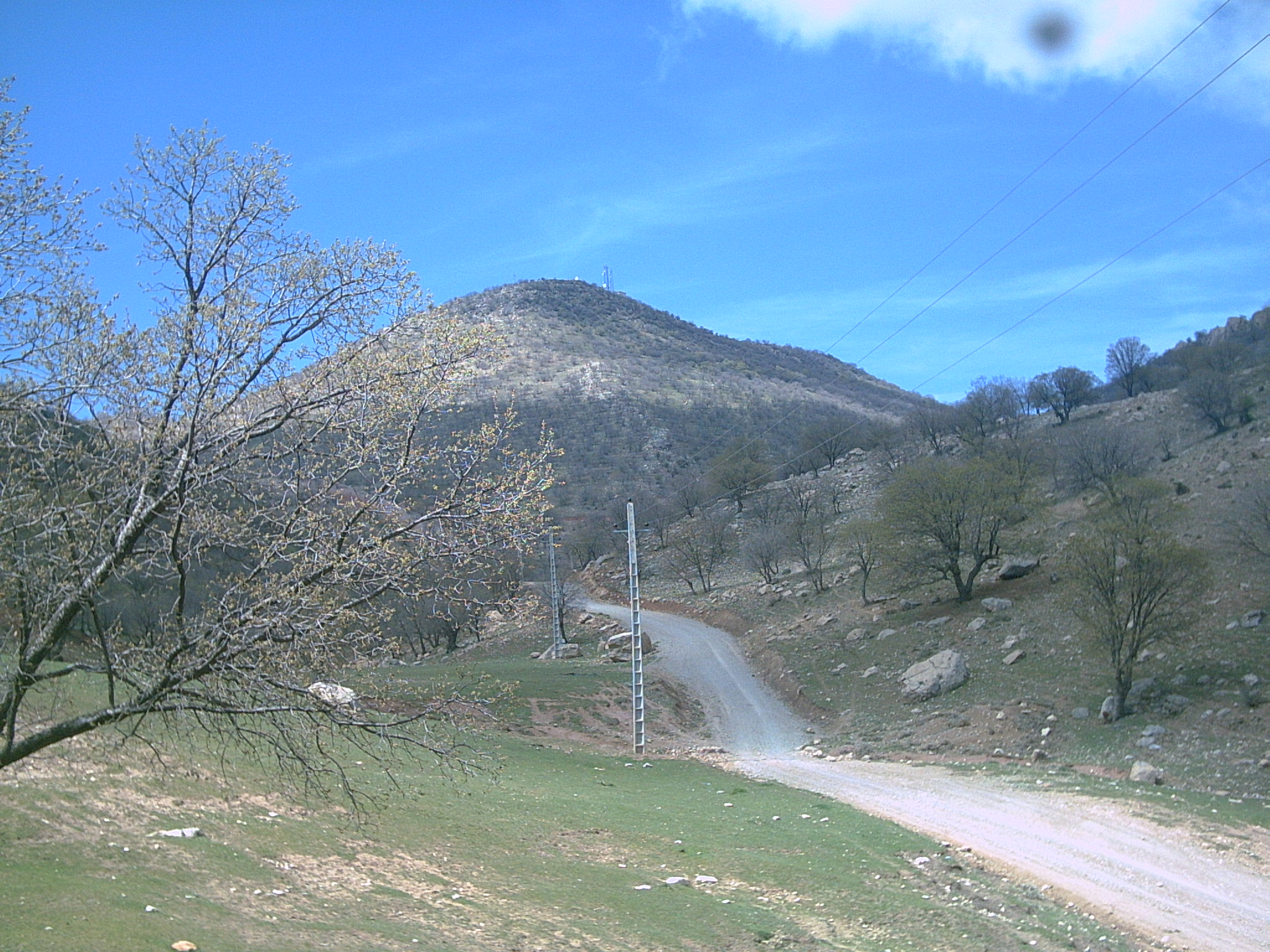
Boluran mountain.

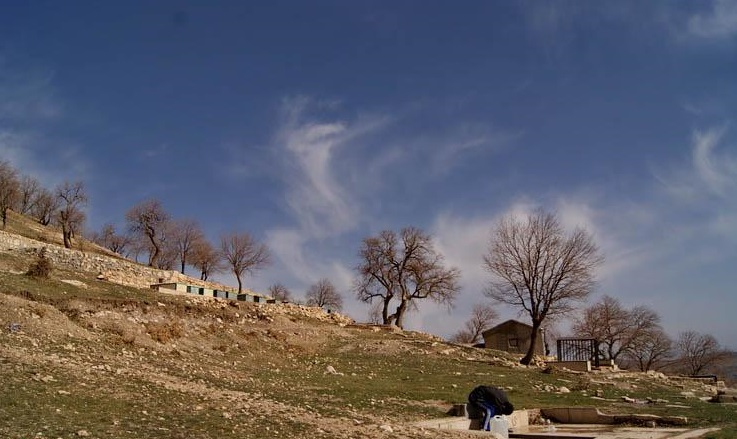
The Historical cemetery on the mountainside of Boluran.
