= Siah Cheshmeh, Lorestan =

Village in Lorestan province, Iran

Siah Cheshmeh Persian: سياه چشمه
- Village
- Location within Iran
- Coordinates: 33°36′44″N 47°21′39″E
- Country: Iran
- Province: Lorestan
- County: Kuhdasht
- District: Darb-e Gonbad
- Rural District: Boluran

Population (2016)
  - Total: 488
- Time zone: UTC+3:30 (IRST)

Siah Cheshmeh (Persian: سياه چشمه) (Note: Also romanized as Sīāh Cheshmeh) is a village in Boluran Rural District of Darb-e Gonbad District in Kuhdasht County, Lorestan province, Iran.

== Demographics ==
=== Population ===
At the time of the 2006 National Census, the village's population was 914 in 167 households. The following census in 2011 counted 954 people in 210 households. The 2016 census measured the population of the village as 488 people in 111 households.
