= Kavirabad, Tehran =

Village in Tehran province, Iran

Kavirabad Persian: كويراباد
- Village
- Location within Iran
- Coordinates: 35°14′40″N 51°34′11″E
- Country: Iran
- Province: Tehran
- County: Varamin
- District: Javadabad
- Rural District: Behnamvasat-e Jonubi

Population (2016)
  - Total: 307
- Time zone: UTC+3:30 (IRST)

Kavirabad (Persian: كويراباد) (Note: Also romanized as Kavīrābād) is a village in Behnamvasat-e Jonubi Rural District of Javadabad District in Varamin County, Tehran province, Iran.

== Demographics ==
=== Population ===
At the time of the 2006 National Census, the village's population was 276 in 70 households. The following census in 2011 counted 377 people in 117 households. The 2016 census measured the population of the village as 307 people in 107 households.
