= Ab Barik, Tehran =

Village in Tehran province, Iran

Ab Barik Persian: اب باريك
- Village
- Location within Iran
- Coordinates: 35°15′41″N 51°36′42″E
- Country: Iran
- Province: Tehran
- County: Varamin
- District: Javadabad
- Rural District: Behnamvasat-e Jonubi

Population (2016)
  - Total: 2,034
- Time zone: UTC+3:30 (IRST)

Ab Barik (Persian: اب باريك) (Note: Also romanized as Āb Bārīk) is a village in, and the capital of, Behnamvasat-e Jonubi Rural District in Javadabad District of Varamin County, Tehran province, Iran.

== Demographics ==
=== Population ===
At the time of the 2006 National Census, the village's population was 1,755 in 429 households. The following census in 2011 counted 2,007 people in 500 households. The 2016 census measured the population of the village as 2,034 people in 613 households. It was the most populous village in its rural district.
