= Darb-e Gonbad =

City in Lorestan province, Iran

Darb-e Gonbad Persian: درب گنبد
- City
- Location within Iran
- Coordinates: 33°41′24″N 47°09′01″E
- Country: Iran
- Province: Lorestan
- County: Kuhdasht
- District: Darb-e Gonbad
- Established as a city: 2004

Population (2016)
  - Total: 2,131
- Time zone: UTC+3:30 (IRST)

Darb-e Gonbad (Persian: درب گنبد) is a city in, and the capital of, Darb-e Gonbad District of Kuhdasht County, Lorestan province, Iran. It also serves as the administrative center for Darb-e Gonbad Rural District. The village of Darb-e Gonbad was converted to a city in 2004.

== Demographics ==
=== Population ===
At the time of the 2006 National Census, the city's population was 2,119 in 451 households. The following census in 2011 counted 2,191 people in 581 households. The 2016 census measured the population of the city as 2,131 people in 624 households.
