= Ganjali-e Sofla =

Ganjali-e Sofla گنجعلي سفلي
- Village
- Location within Iran
- Coordinates: 33°35′13″N 47°13′02″E
- Country: Iran
- Province: Lorestan
- County: Kuhdasht
- Bakhsh: Darb-e Gonbad
- Rural District: Boluran

Population (2006)
  - Total: 95
- Time zone: UTC+3:30 (IRST)
  - Summer (DST): UTC+4:30 (IRDT)

Ganjali-e Sofla (Persian: گنجعلي سفلي, also Romanized as Ganj‘alī-e Soflá; also known as Ganj‘alī, Baleyn, and Ganj ‘Alīābād-e Soflá) is a village in Boluran Rural District, Darb-e Gonbad District, Kuhdasht County, Lorestan Province, Iran. At the 2006 census, its population was 95, in 19 families.
