= Ajorbast =

Village in Tehran province, Iran

Ajorbast Persian: اجربست
- Village
- Location within Iran
- Coordinates: 35°18′03″N 51°38′45″E
- Country: Iran
- Province: Tehran
- County: Varamin
- District: Javadabad
- Rural District: Behnamvasat-e Jonubi

Population (2016)
  - Total: 132
- Time zone: UTC+3:30 (IRST)

Ajorbast (Persian: اجربست) (Note: Also romanized as Ājorbast) is a village in Behnamvasat-e Jonubi Rural District of Javadabad District in Varamin County, Tehran province, Iran.

== Demographics ==
=== Population ===
At the time of the 2006 National Census, the village's population was 179 in 46 households. The following census in 2011 counted 100 people in 29 households. The 2016 census measured the population of the village as 132 people in 41 households.
