= Khaledabad, Tehran =

Village in Tehran province, Iran

Khaledabad Persian: خالداباد
- Village
- Location within Iran
- Coordinates: 35°16′03″N 51°36′22″E
- Country: Iran
- Province: Tehran
- County: Varamin
- District: Javadabad
- Rural District: Behnamvasat-e Jonubi

Population (2016)
  - Total: 827
- Time zone: UTC+3:30 (IRST)

Khaledabad (Persian: خالداباد) (Note: Also romanized as Khāledābād; also known as Khālidābād) is a village in Behnamvasat-e Jonubi Rural District of Javadabad District in Varamin County, Tehran province, Iran.

== Demographics ==
=== Population ===
At the time of the 2006 National Census, the village's population was 548 in 139 households. The following census in 2011 counted 452 people in 123 households. The 2016 census measured the population of the village as 827 people in 244 households.
