= Ganjali, Lorestan =

Ganjali گنج علي
- Village
- Location within Iran
- Coordinates: 33°34′53″N 47°13′35″E
- Country: Iran
- Province: Lorestan
- County: Kuhdasht
- Bakhsh: Darb-e Gonbad
- Rural District: Boluran

Population (2006)
  - Total: 76
- Time zone: UTC+3:30 (IRST)
  - Summer (DST): UTC+4:30 (IRDT)

Ganjali (Persian: گنج علي, also Romanized as Ganj‘alī; also known as Ganj ‘Alīābād-e ‘Olyā) is a village in Boluran Rural District, Darb-e Gonbad District, Kuhdasht County, Lorestan Province, Iran. At the 2006 census, its population was 76, in 17 families.
