= Behnamvasat-e Jonubi Rural District =

Rural district in Tehran province, Iran

Behnamvasat-e Jonubi Rural District Persian: دهستان بهنام عرب جنوبي
- Rural District
- Location within Iran
- Coordinates: 35°15′N 51°36′E
- Country: Iran
- Province: Tehran
- County: Varamin
- District: Javadabad
- Established: 1987
- Capital: Ab Barik

Population (2016)
  - Total: 6,655
- Time zone: UTC+3:30 (IRST)

Behnamvasat-e Jonubi Rural District (Persian: دهستان بهنام عرب جنوبي) is in Javadabad District of Varamin County, Tehran province, Iran. Its capital is the village of Ab Barik.

== Demographics ==
=== Population ===
At the time of the 2006 National Census, the rural district's population was 6,152 in 1,514 households. There were 5,983 inhabitants in 1,601 households at the following census of 2011. The 2016 census measured the population of the rural district as 6,655 in 1,943 households. The most populous of its 31 villages was Ab Barik, with 2,034 people.

=== Other villages in the rural district ===
- Ajorbast
- Damzabad
- Kavirabad
- Khaledabad
- Musaabad-e Bakhtiari
- Zahirabad
