= Damzabad =

Village in Tehran province, Iran

Damzabad Persian: دمزاباد
- Village
- Location within Iran
- Coordinates: 35°15′14″N 51°37′28″E
- Country: Iran
- Province: Tehran
- County: Varamin
- District: Javadabad
- Rural District: Behnamvasat-e Jonubi

Population (2016)
  - Total: 1,156
- Time zone: UTC+3:30 (IRST)

Damzabad (Persian: دمزاباد) (Note: Also romanized as Damezābād and Damzābād) is a village in Behnamvasat-e Jonubi Rural District of Javadabad District in Varamin County, Tehran province, Iran.

== Demographics ==
=== Population ===
At the time of the 2006 National Census, the village's population was 1,440 in 346 households. The following census in 2011 counted 1,147 people in 314 households. The 2016 census measured the population of the village as 1,156 people in 337 households.
