= Zahirabad, Tehran =

Village in Tehran province, Iran

Zahirabad Persian: ظهيراباد
- Village
- Location within Iran
- Coordinates: 35°12′56″N 51°37′36″E
- Country: Iran
- Province: Tehran
- County: Varamin
- District: Javadabad
- Rural District: Behnamvasat-e Jonubi

Population (2016)
  - Total: 270
- Time zone: UTC+3:30 (IRST)

Zahirabad (Persian: ظهيراباد) (Note: Also romanized as Z̧ahīrābād) is a village in Behnamvasat-e Jonubi Rural District of Javadabad District in Varamin County, Tehran province, Iran.

== Demographics ==
=== Population ===
At the time of the 2006 National Census, the village's population was 329 in 70 households. The following census in 2011 counted 322 people in 82 households. The 2016 census measured the population of the village as 270 people in 76 households.
