= Ganjali, Ardabil =

Ganjali
- Location in Iran
- Coordinates: 38°28′37″N 47°58′29″E
- Country: Iran
- Province: Ardabil Province
- Time zone: UTC+3:30 (IRST)
  - Summer (DST): UTC+4:30 (IRDT)

Ganjali is a village in the Ardabil Province of Iran.
