= Musaabad, Rafsanjan =

Musaabad موسي اباد
- Village
- Location within Iran
- Coordinates: 30°28′21″N 55°59′44″E
- Country: Iran
- Province: Kerman
- County: Rafsanjan
- Bakhsh: Central
- Rural District: Azadegan

Population (2006)
  - Total: 222
- Time zone: UTC+3:30 (IRST)
  - Summer (DST): UTC+4:30 (IRDT)

Musaabad (Persian: موسي اباد, also Romanized as Mūsáābād and Moosa Abad) is a village in Azadegan Rural District, in the Central District of Rafsanjan County, Kerman Province, Iran. At the 2006 census, its population was 222, in 55 families.
