= Musaabad (33°51′ N 48°13′ E), Selseleh =

Musaabad موسی‌آباد
- Village
- Location within Iran
- Coordinates: 33°51′20″N 48°12′50″E
- Country: Iran
- Province: Lorestan
- County: Selseleh
- Bakhsh: Central
- Rural District: Doab

Population (2006)
  - Total: 53
- Time zone: UTC+3:30 (IRST)
  - Summer (DST): UTC+4:30 (IRDT)

Musaabad (Persian: موسی‌آباد, also Romanized as Mūsáābād) is a village in Doab Rural District, in the Central District of Selseleh County, Lorestan Province, Iran. At the 2006 census, its population was 53, in 10 families.
