= Kuchekeh Shiravand =

Village in Lorestan province, Iran

Kuchekeh Shiravand Persian: کوچکه شيراوند
- Village
- Location within Iran
- Coordinates: 33°42′44″N 47°10′38″E
- Country: Iran
- Province: Lorestan
- County: Kuhdasht
- District: Darb-e Gonbad
- Rural District: Darb-e Gonbad

Population (2016)
  - Total: 994
- Time zone: UTC+3:30 (IRST)

Kuchekeh Shiravand (Persian: کوچکه شيراوند) (Note: Also romanized as Kūchekeh Shīrāvand; also known as Shīrāvand-e Pā’īn (شيراوند پايين) and Shīrāvand-e Soflá (شيراوند سفلي)) is a village in Darb-e Gonbad Rural District of Darb-e Gonbad District in Kuhdasht County, Lorestan province, Iran.

== Demographics ==
=== Population ===
At the time of the 2006 National Census, the village's population was 909 in 167 households. The following census in 2011 counted 835 people in 208 households. The 2016 census measured the population of the village as 994 people in 248 households, the most populous in its rural district.
