= Cham Deylavand-e Bala =

Village in Lorestan province, Iran

Cham Deylavand-e Bala Persian: چم ديلاوندبالا
- Village
- Location within Iran
- Coordinates: 33°41′54″N 47°07′36″E
- Country: Iran
- Province: Lorestan
- County: Kuhdasht
- District: Darb-e Gonbad
- Rural District: Darb-e Gonbad

Population (2016)
  - Total: 301
- Time zone: UTC+3:30 (IRST)

Cham Deylavand-e Bala (Persian: چم ديلاوندبالا) (Note: Also romanized as Cham Deylāvand-e Bālā; formerly known as Cham Deylavand-e Olya (چمديلاوندعليا), also romanized as Cham Deylāvand-e ‘Olyā; also known as Deylāvand-e ‘Olyā) is a village in Darb-e Gonbad Rural District of Darb-e Gonbad District in Kuhdasht County, Lorestan province, Iran.

== Demographics ==
=== Population ===
At the time of the 2006 National Census, the village's population, as Cham Deylavand-e Olya, was 330 in 66 households. The following census in 2011 counted 327 people in 83 households, by which time the village was listed as Cham Deylavand-e Bala. The 2016 census measured the population of the village as 301 people in 85 households.
