= Aqa Baba Shiravand =

Village in Lorestan province, Iran

Aqa Baba Shiravand Persian: آقاباباشيراوند
- Village
- Location within Iran
- Coordinates: 33°43′03″N 47°11′24″E
- Country: Iran
- Province: Lorestan
- County: Kuhdasht
- District: Darb-e Gonbad
- Rural District: Darb-e Gonbad

Population (2016)
  - Total: 665
- Time zone: UTC+3:30 (IRST)

Aqa Baba Shiravand (Persian: آقاباباشيراوند) (Note: Also romanized as Āqā Bābā Shīrāvand and Āqābābāshīrāvand; also known as Shīrāvand-e Bālā (شيراوند بالا) and Shīrāvand-e ‘Olyā (شيراوند عليا)) is a village in Darb-e Gonbad Rural District of Darb-e Gonbad District in Kuhdasht County, Lorestan province, Iran.

== Demographics ==
=== Population ===
At the time of the 2006 National Census, the village's population was 624 in 124 households. The following census in 2011 counted 639 people in 157 households. The 2016 census measured the population of the village as 665 people in 164 households.
