= Garmeh Khani, Nurabad =

Garmeh Khani گرمه خاني
- Village
- Location within Iran
- Coordinates: 34°00′00″N 47°52′00″E
- Country: Iran
- Province: Lorestan
- County: Delfan
- Bakhsh: Central
- Rural District: Nurabad

Population (2006)
  - Total: 31
- Time zone: UTC+3:30 (IRST)
  - Summer (DST): UTC+4:30 (IRDT)

Garmeh Khani (Persian: گرمه خاني, also Romanized as Garmeh Khānī) is a village in Nurabad Rural District, in the Central District of Delfan County, Lorestan Province, Iran. At the 2006 census, its population was 31, in 6 families.
