= Cham Deylavand-e Pain =

Village in Lorestan province, Iran

Cham Deylavand-e Pain Persian: چمديلاوند پايين
- Village
- Location within Iran
- Coordinates: 33°42′04″N 47°06′02″E
- Country: Iran
- Province: Lorestan
- County: Kuhdasht
- District: Darb-e Gonbad
- Rural District: Darb-e Gonbad

Population (2016)
  - Total: 99
- Time zone: UTC+3:30 (IRST)

Cham Deylavand-e Pain (Persian: چمديلاوند پايين) (Note: Also romanized as Cham Deylāvand-e Pā’īn; formerly known as Cham Deylavand-e Sofla (چمديلاوندسفلي), also romanized as Cham Deylāvand-e Soflá; also known as Deylāvand, Deylāvand-e Soflá, and Dīlvand) is a village in Darb-e Gonbad Rural District of Darb-e Gonbad District in Kuhdasht County, Lorestan province, Iran.

== Demographics ==
=== Population ===
At the time of the 2006 National Census, the village's population, as Cham Deylavand-e Sofla, was 137 in 24 households. The following census in 2011 counted 104 people in 24 households, by which time the village was listed as Cham Deylavand-e Pain. The 2016 census measured the population of the village as 99 people in 27 households.
