= Musaabad-e Bakhtiari =

Village in Tehran province, Iran

Musaabad-e Bakhtiari Persian: موسي ابادبختياري
- Village
- Location within Iran
- Coordinates: 35°18′49″N 51°37′22″E
- Country: Iran
- Province: Tehran
- County: Varamin
- District: Javadabad
- Rural District: Behnamvasat-e Jonubi

Population (2016)
  - Total: 1,422
- Time zone: UTC+3:30 (IRST)

Musaabad-e Bakhtiari (Persian: موسي ابادبختياري) (Note: Also romanized as Mūsáābād-e Bakhtīārī; also known as Mūsáābād-e Bakhtīār) is a village in Behnamvasat-e Jonubi Rural District of Javadabad District in Varamin County, Tehran province, Iran.

== Demographics ==
=== Population ===
At the time of the 2006 National Census, the village's population was 846 in 206 households. The following census in 2011 counted 1,038 people in 284 households. The 2016 census measured the population of the village as 1,422 people in 353 households.
