= Shiravand Naveh =

Village in Lorestan province, Iran

Shiravand Naveh Persian: شيراوند ناوه
- Village
- Location within Iran
- Coordinates: 33°30′51″N 47°28′26″E
- Country: Iran
- Province: Lorestan
- County: Kuhdasht
- District: Central
- Rural District: Gol Gol

Population (2016)
  - Total: 588
- Time zone: UTC+3:30 (IRST)

Shiravand Naveh (Persian: شيراوند ناوه) (Note: Also romanized as Shīrāvand Nāveh; also known as Nāveh Shīrāvand (ناوه شيراوند) and Shīrāvand) is a village in Gol Gol Rural District of the Central District in Kuhdasht County, Lorestan province, Iran.

== Demographics ==
=== Population ===
At the time of the 2006 National Census, the village's population was 475 in 97 households. The following census in 2011 counted 592 people in 149 households. The 2016 census measured the population of the village as 588 people in 159 households.
