= Shiravand, Selseleh =

Shiravand شيراوند
- Village
- Location within Iran
- Coordinates: 33°47′08″N 48°16′42″E
- Country: Iran
- Province: Lorestan
- County: Selseleh
- Bakhsh: Central
- Rural District: Honam

Population (2006)
  - Total: 24
- Time zone: UTC+3:30 (IRST)
  - Summer (DST): UTC+4:30 (IRDT)

Shiravand (Persian: شيراوند, also Romanized as Shīrāvand; also known as Shīrābād) is a village in Honam Rural District, in the Central District of Selseleh County, Lorestan Province, Iran. At the 2006 census, its population was 24, in 6 families.
