= Keryeh-ye Seh =

Village in Lorestan province, Iran

Keryeh-ye Seh Persian: کريه سه
- Village
- Location within Iran
- Country: Iran
- Province: Lorestan
- County: Chegeni
- District: Central
- Rural District: Teshkan

Population (2016)
  - Total: 36
- Time zone: UTC+3:30 (IRST)

Keryeh-ye Seh (Persian: کريه سه) (Note: Formerly known as Keryeh-ye Abdolah Shiravand (کريه عبداله شيراوند), also romanized as Keryeh-ye ʿAbdolah Shīrāvand; also known as Keryeh-ye Shīrāvand, Sharawand, and Shīrāvand) is a village in Teshkan Rural District of the Central District (Note: Formerly Chegeni District) in Chegeni County, (Note: Formerly Dowreh County) Lorestan province, Iran.

== Demographics ==
=== Population ===
At the time of the 2006 National Census, the village's population, as Keryeh-ye Abdolah Shiravand, was 76 in 14 households, when it was in the former Dowreh-ye Chegeni District of Khorramabad County. The following census in 2011 counted 56 people in 14 households, by which time the district had been separated from the county in the establishment of Dowreh County. (Note: Renamed Chegeni County) The rural district was transferred to the new Chegeni District, (Note: Renamed the Central District) and the village was listed as Keryeh-ye Seh. The 2016 census measured the population of the village as 36 people in nine households.
