= Shiravand Gandabeh =

Village in Lorestan province, Iran

Shiravand Gandabeh Persian: شيراوندگندابه
- Village
- Location within Iran
- Coordinates: 33°30′57″N 47°29′38″E
- Country: Iran
- Province: Lorestan
- County: Kuhdasht
- District: Central
- Rural District: Gol Gol

Population (2016)
  - Total: 770
- Time zone: UTC+3:30 (IRST)

Shiravand Gandabeh (Persian: شيراوندگندابه) (Note: Also romanized as Shīrāvand Gandābeh) is a village in Gol Gol Rural District of the Central District in Kuhdasht County, Lorestan province, Iran.

== Demographics ==
=== Population ===
At the time of the 2006 National Census, the village's population was 781 in 153 households. The following census in 2011 counted 863 people in 211 households. The 2016 census measured the population of the village as 770 people in 214 households.
