= Chaqabol =

City in Lorestan province, Iran

Chaqabol Persian: چقابل
- City
- Location within Iran
- Coordinates: 33°16′56″N 47°30′32″E
- Country: Iran
- Province: Lorestan
- County: Rumeshkan
- District: Central
- Established as a city: 1996

Population (2016)
  - Total: 6,125
- Time zone: UTC+3:30 (IRST)

Chaqabol (Persian: چقابل) (Note: Also romanized as Chaqābal, Chaqābol, and Choqā Bol; also known as Choghā Bol) is a city in the Central District of Rumeshkan County, Lorestan province, Iran, serving as capital of both the county and the district. It is also the administrative center for Rumeshkan Rural District. (Note: Formerly Rumeshkan-e Sharqi Rural District)

== History ==
The village of Chaqabol was converted to a city in 1996.

== Demographics ==
=== Population ===
At the time of the 2006 National Census, the city's population was 4,801 in 1,037 households, when it was capital of the former Rumeshkan District of Kuhdasht County. The following census in 2011 counted 5,176 people in 1,321 households. The 2016 census measured the population of the city as 6,125 people in 1,614 households, by which time the district had been separated from the county in the establishment of Rumeshkan County. The city was transferred to the new Central District as the county's capital.
