= Boluran Rural District =

Rural district in Lorestan province, Iran

Boluran Rural District Persian: دهستان بلوران
- Rural District
- Location within Iran
- Coordinates: 33°36′N 47°19′E
- Country: Iran
- Province: Lorestan
- County: Kuhdasht
- District: Darb-e Gonbad
- Established: 2003
- Capital: Boluran

Population (2016)
  - Total: 3,082
- Time zone: UTC+3:30 (IRST)

Boluran Rural District (Persian: دهستان بلوران) is in Darb-e Gonbad District of Kuhdasht County, Lorestan province, Iran. Its capital is the village of Boluran.

== Demographics ==
=== Population ===
At the time of the 2006 National Census, the rural district's population was 5,012 in 1,005 households. There were 4,650 inhabitants in 1,094 households at the following census of 2011. The 2016 census measured the population of the rural district as 3,082 in 824 households. The most populous of its 18 villages was Boluran, with 742 people.

=== Other villages in the rural district ===
- Bareh Jula
- Bareh Kalak
- Bareh Kheyreh
- Bareh Tork
- Kheyran Bareh
- Siah Cheshmeh
