= Suri Rural District =

Rural district in Lorestan province, Iran

Suri Rural District Persian: دهستان سوري
- Rural District
- Location within Iran
- Coordinates: 33°17′06″N 47°18′44″E
- Country: Iran
- Province: Lorestan
- County: Rumeshkan
- District: Suri
- Established: 1995
- Capital: Suri

Population (2016)
  - Total: 8,013
- Time zone: UTC+3:30 (IRST)

Suri Rural District (Persian: دهستان سوري) (Note: Formerly Rumeshkan-e Gharbi Rural District (دهستان رومشكان غربي)) is in Suri District of Rumeshkan County, Lorestan province, Iran. Its capital is the village of Suri.

== Demographics ==
=== Population ===
At the time of the 2006 National Census, the rural district's population (as Rumeshkan-e Gharbi Rural District in the former Rumeshkan District of Kuhdasht County) was 11,376 in 2,331 households. There were 11,938 inhabitants in 2,906 households at the following census of 2011. The 2016 census measured the population of the rural district as 8,013 in 2,275 households, by which time the district had been separated from the county in the establishment of Rumeshkan County. The rural district was transferred to the new Suri District and renamed Suri Rural District. The most populous of its 17 villages was Suri, with 3,832 people.

=== Other villages in the rural district ===
- Asadabad
- Azizabad
- Chogha Sabz-e Khoda Nazar
- Nasarkhasiabad
- Ramavandi-ye Pain
- Sefid Khani-ye Jadid
- Shiravand
- Towhid Suri
