= Darb-e Gonbad Rural District =

Rural district in Lorestan province, Iran

Darb-e Gonbad Rural District Persian: دهستان درب گنبد
- Rural District
- Location within Iran
- Coordinates: 33°40′N 47°11′E
- Country: Iran
- Province: Lorestan
- County: Kuhdasht
- District: Darb-e Gonbad
- Established: 1987
- Capital: Darb-e Gonbad

Population (2016)
  - Total: 5,408
- Time zone: UTC+3:30 (IRST)

Darb-e Gonbad Rural District (Persian: دهستان درب گنبد) is in Darb-e Gonbad District of Kuhdasht County, Lorestan province, Iran. It is administered from the city of Darb-e Gonbad.

== Demographics ==
=== Population ===
At the time of the 2006 National Census, the rural district's population was 5,886 in 1,153 households. There were 5,821 inhabitants in 1,449 households at the following census of 2011. The 2016 census measured the population of the rural district as 5,408 in 1,423 households. The most populous of its 20 villages was Kuchekeh Shiravand, with 994 people.

=== Other villages in the rural district ===
- Aqa Baba Shiravand
- Cham Deylavand-e Bala
- Cham Deylavand-e Pain
- Cham Kushk-e Tulabi
- Cham Qaleh
- Shor Shoreh
