= Rumeshkan Rural District =

Rural district in Lorestan province, Iran

Rumeshkan Rural District Persian: دهستان رومشکان
- Rural District
- Location within Iran
- Coordinates: 33°14′N 47°29′E
- Country: Iran
- Province: Lorestan
- County: Rumeshkan
- District: Central
- Capital: Chaqabol

Population (2016)
  - Total: 7,814
- Time zone: UTC+3:30 (IRST)

Rumeshkan Rural District (Persian: دهستان رومشکان) (Note: Formerly Rumeshkan-e Sharqi Rural District (دهستان رومشكان شرقي)) is in the Central District of Rumeshkan County, Lorestan province, Iran. It is administered from the city of Chaqabol.

== Demographics ==
=== Population ===
At the time of the 2006 National Census, the rural district's population (as Rumeshkan-e Sharqi Rural District (Note: Renamed Rumeshkan Rural District) in the former Rumeshkan District of Kuhdasht County) was 19,418 in 4,055 households. There were 21,587 inhabitants in 5,222 households at the following census of 2011. The 2016 census measured the population of the rural district as 7,814 in 2,130 households, by which time the district had been separated from the county in the establishment of Rumeshkan County. The rural district was transferred to the new Central District and renamed Rumeshkan Rural District. The most populous of its eight villages was Aqajan, with 2,364 people.

=== Other villages in the rural district ===
- Choqapur Aliabad
- Lalvand
- Mahki
- Mohammadabad-e Garavand
- Rahmanabad-e Zagheh-ye Lalvand
- Rashnudeh
