= Central District (Rumeshkan County) =

District in Lorestan province, Iran

Central District (Rumeshkan County) Persian: بخش مرکزی شهرستان رومشکان
- District
- Location within Iran
- Coordinates: 33°14′N 47°31′E
- Country: Iran
- Province: Lorestan
- County: Rumeshkan
- Established: 2013
- Capital: Chaqabol

Population (2016)
  - Total: 22,053
- Time zone: UTC+3:30 (IRST)

The Central District of Rumeshkan County (Persian: بخش مرکزی شهرستان رومشکان) is in Lorestan province, Iran. Its capital is the city of Chaqabol.

== History ==
In 2013, Rumeshkan District was separated from Kuhdasht County in the establishment of Rumeshkan County, which was divided into two districts of two rural districts each, with Chaqabol as its capital and only city at the time.

== Demographics ==
=== Population ===
At the time of the 2016 National Census, the district's population was 22,053 inhabitants in 6,071 households.

=== Administrative divisions ===
Central District (Rumeshkan County) Population
Administrative Divisions	2016
Bazvand RD	8,114
Rumeshkan RD (Note: Formerly Rumeshkan-e Sharqi Rural District)	7,814
Chaqabol (city)	6,125
Total	22,053
RD = Rural District
