= Suri District =

District in Lorestan province, Iran

Suri District Persian: بخش سوري
- District
- Location within Iran
- Coordinates: 33°17′N 47°21′E
- Country: Iran
- Province: Lorestan
- County: Rumeshkan
- Established: 2013
- Capital: Suri

Population (2016)
  - Total: 17,005
- Time zone: UTC+3:30 (IRST)

Suri District (Persian: بخش سوري) is in Rumeshkan County, Lorestan province, Iran. Its capital is the village of Suri. The district has a total of 19 villages. Mount Vyznhar (Vznyar), the highest mountain in the county, is located in Suri District. On its slopes are the ruins of Kohzad Castle.

== History ==
In 2013, Rumeshkan District was separated from Kuhdasht County in the establishment of Rumeshkan County, which was divided into two districts of two rural districts each, with Chaqabol as its capital and only city at the time.

== Demographics ==
=== Population ===
At the time of the 2016 National Census, the district's population was 17,005 inhabitants in 4,671 households.

=== Administrative divisions ===
Suri District Population
| Administrative Divisions | 2016 |
|---|---|
| Rumiani RD | 8,992 |
| Suri RD (Note: Formerly Rumeshkan-e Gharbi Rural District) | 8,013 |
| Total | 17,005 |
RD = Rural District
