= Darb-e Gonbad District =

District in Lorestan province, Iran

Darb-e Gonbad District Persian: بخش درب گنبد
- District
- Location within Iran
- Coordinates: 33°38′N 47°14′E
- Country: Iran
- Province: Lorestan
- County: Kuhdasht
- Established: 2003
- Capital: Darb-e Gonbad

Population (2016)
  - Total: 10,621
- Time zone: UTC+3:30 (IRST)

Darb-e Gonbad District (Persian: بخش درب گنبد) is in Kuhdasht County, Lorestan province, Iran. Its capital is the city of Darb-e Gonbad.

== Demographics ==
=== Population ===
At the time of the 2006 National Census, the district's population was 13,017 in 2,609 households. The following census in 2011 counted 12,662 people in 3,124 households. The 2016 census measured the population of the district as 10,621 inhabitants in 2,871 households.

=== Administrative divisions ===
Darb-e Gonbad District Population
Administrative Divisions	2006	2011	2016
Boluran RD	5,012	4,650	3,082
Darb-e Gonbad RD	5,886	5,821	5,408
Darb-e Gonbad (city)	2,119	2,191	2,131
Total	13,017	12,662	10,621
RD = Rural District
