= Rumeshkan County =

County in Lorestan province, Iran

Rumeshkan County Persian: شهرستان رومشکان
- County
- Location of Rumeshkan County in Lorestan province (left, green)

- Location of Lorestan province in Iran
- Coordinates: 33°15′N 47°25′E
- Country: Iran
- Province: Lorestan
- Established: 2013
- Capital: Chaqabol
- Districts: Central, Suri

Area
  - Total: 853 km^{2} (329 sq mi)
- Elevation: 1,095 m (3,593 ft)

Population (2016)
  - Total: 39,058
  - Density: 45.8/km^{2} (119/sq mi)
- Time zone: UTC+3:30 (IRST)

Rumeshkan County (Persian: شهرستان رومشکان) (Note: Also known as Rūmeshgān County) is in Lorestan province, Iran. Its capital is the city of Chaqabol.

== History ==
Archaeological evidence shows the influence of Roman style architecture, and the name of this region is a compound of the words Rum (Romans) and eshkan (break) and it is believed that this area is where Eastern Roman Empire was defeated.

In 2013, Rumeshkan District was separated from Kuhdasht County in the establishment of Rumeshkan County, which was divided into two districts of two rural districts each, with Chaqabol as its capital and only city at the time.

== Demographics ==
=== Population ===
At the time of the 2016 National Census, the county's population was 39,058 in 10,742 households.

=== Administrative divisions ===
Rumeshkan County's population and administrative structure are shown in the following table.

Rumeshkan County Population
Administrative Divisions	2016
Central District	22,053
Bazvand RD	8,114
Rumeshkan RD (Note: Formerly Rumeshkan-e Sharqi Rural District)	7,814
Chaqabol (city)	6,125
Suri District	17,005
Rumiani RD	8,992
Suri RD (Note: Formerly Rumeshkan-e Gharbi Rural District)	8,013
Total	39,058
RD = Rural District

== Geography ==
=== Location ===
Rumeshkan County lies between 32 degrees 15 minutes to 33 degrees 25 minutes north latitude, and between 47 degrees 20 minutes to 47 degrees 40 minutes east longitude. The county is mountainous with major northwest to southeast trending ranges. The lower plains are generally high desert steppe.

=== Climate ===
Rumeshkan experiences a temperate and semi-dry climate with maximum temperatures in summer around 40 °C (104 °F). The minimum temperature in winter averages about −7 °C (19 °F). Average annual rainfall is 450 mm.

== Economy ==
The principle occupations in Rumeshkan County are animal husbandry, and farming in the river valleys. Most of the crops are cereals, especially barley and wheat. In many of the villages and around Chaqabol, deep wells provide for irrigated agriculture and vegetable and melons are grown. These become a cash crop near Chaqabol and where transportation is available to other cities. In some areas orchards have been planted. In the 21st century, Rumeshkan began to experience severe drought which has decreased agricultural production and impoverished some farmers.

In 2015 the government in cooperation with the private sector opened a steel mill.

== Scenic areas ==
- Drvnshr Cave (غار درونشر), a limestone cave with a variety of cave formations.
- Kalmakareh Cave has been occupied by humans since pre-historic time and has yielded up artifacts from several civilizations.
- Zagheh Castle (قلعه زاخه), two kilometers east of Chaqabol, is a ruin of a Roman fort with later Sassanid additions.
- Mount Vyznhar (Vznyar) is the highest mountain in the county. On its slopes are the ruins of Kohzad Castle.

== See also ==
- Romans in Persia

Media related to Rumeshkan County at Wikimedia Commons
