= Rumeshkan District =

Former district in Lorestan province, Iran

Rumeshkan District Persian: بخش رومشکان
- Former District
- Location within Iran
- Coordinates: 33°15′N 47°25′E
- Country: Iran
- Province: Lorestan
- County: Kuhdasht
- Established: 1989
- Capital: Chaqabol

Population (2011)
  - Total: 38,701
- Time zone: UTC+3:30 (IRST)

Rumeshkan District (Persian: بخش رومشکان) is a former administrative division of Kuhdasht County, Lorestan province, Iran. Its capital was the city of Chaqabol.

== History ==
In 2013, the district was separated from the county in the establishment of Rumeshkan County.

== Demographics ==
=== Population ===
At the time of the 2006 National Census, the district's population was 35,595 in 7,423 households. The following census in 2011 counted 38,701 people in 9,449 households.

=== Administrative divisions ===
Rumeshkan District Population
Administrative Divisions	2006	2011
Rumeshkan-e Gharbi RD (Note: Renamed Suri Rural District)	11,376	11,938
Rumeshkan-e Sharqi RD (Note: Renamed Rumeshkan Rural District)	19,418	21,587
Chaqabol (city)	4,801	5,176
Total	35,595	38,701
RD = Rural District
