= Gareh =

Gareh or Goreh or Gorah or Garreh or Gorreh (Persian: گره or گاره) may refer to several places in Iran:

- Goreh, Bushehr (گره - Gareh)
- Gareh, Fars (گاره - Gāreh)
- Gareh, Rostam, Fars Province (گره - Gareh)
- Gareh, Keshvar, Lorestan Province (گاره - Gāreh)
- Gareh, Tang-e Haft, Lorestan Province (گره - Gareh)

== See also ==
- Gereh Cheqa (disambiguation)
- Qarah (disambiguation)
