= Gereh Cheqa =

Gereh Cheqa or Gareh Choqa or Gareh Cheqa or Goreh Choqa (Persian: گره چقا) may refer to:

- Gareh Choqa, Hamadan
- Gereh Cheqa, Ilam
- Goreh Choqa, Kermanshah
- Gareh Choqa, alternate name of Gorgeh Choqa, Kermanshah Province
- Gereh Cheqa, Kurdistan
