= Pariab-e Seyd-e Mohammad =

Pariab-e Seyd-e Mohammad پارياب سيدمحمد
- Village
- Location within Iran
- Coordinates: 33°13′40″N 48°29′16″E
- Country: Iran
- Province: Lorestan
- County: Khorramabad
- Bakhsh: Papi
- Rural District: Keshvar

Population (2006)
  - Total: 20
- Time zone: UTC+3:30 (IRST)
  - Summer (DST): UTC+4:30 (IRDT)

Pariab-e Seyd-e Mohammad (Persian: پارياب سيدمحمد, also Romanized as Pārīāb-e Şeyd-e Moḩammad) is a village in Keshvar Rural District, Papi District, Khorramabad County, Lorestan Province, Iran. At the 2006 census, its population was 20, in 4 families.
