= Shaban Kosh =

Shaban Kosh شبانكش
- Village
- Location within Iran
- Coordinates: 33°14′26″N 48°48′41″E
- Country: Iran
- Province: Lorestan
- County: Khorramabad
- Bakhsh: Papi
- Rural District: Sepiddasht

Population (2006)
  - Total: 75
- Time zone: UTC+3:30 (IRST)
  - Summer (DST): UTC+4:30 (IRDT)

Shaban Kosh (Persian: شبانكش, also Romanized as Shabān Kosh; also known as Shabān Kosh-e ‘Olyā) is a village in Sepiddasht Rural District, Papi District, Khorramabad County, Lorestan Province, Iran. At the 2006 census, its population was 75, in 15 families.
