= Paykabud =

Paykabud پاي كبود
- Village
- Location within Iran
- Coordinates: 33°13′00″N 48°33′00″E
- Country: Iran
- Province: Lorestan
- County: Khorramabad
- Bakhsh: Papi
- Rural District: Keshvar

Population (2006)
  - Total: 15
- Time zone: UTC+3:30 (IRST)
  - Summer (DST): UTC+4:30 (IRDT)

Paykabud (Persian: پاي كبود, also Romanized as Pāykabūd and Pākabūd) is a village in Keshvar Rural District, Papi District, Khorramabad County, Lorestan Province, Iran. At the 2006 census, its population was 15, in 4 families.
