= Bagh Anab =

Bagh Anab باغ وناب
- Village
- Location within Iran
- Coordinates: 33°11′50″N 48°27′30″E
- Country: Iran
- Province: Lorestan
- County: Khorramabad
- Bakhsh: Papi
- Rural District: Keshvar

Population (2006)
  - Total: 16
- Time zone: UTC+3:30 (IRST)
  - Summer (DST): UTC+4:30 (IRDT)

Bagh Anab (Persian: باغ وناب, also Romanized as Bagh ‘Anāb) is a village in Keshvar Rural District, Papi District, Khorramabad County, Lorestan Province, Iran. At the 2006 census, its population was 16, in 4 families.
