= Zaliab =

Zaliab or Zali Ab (Persian: ذالياب) may refer to:

- Zaliab, Khorramabad, Lorestan Province
- Zaliab, Kuhdasht, Lorestan Province
