= Posht Koreh =

Posht Koreh پشتكره
- Village
- Location within Iran
- Coordinates: 33°12′34″N 48°48′54″E
- Country: Iran
- Province: Lorestan
- County: Khorramabad
- Bakhsh: Papi
- Rural District: Chamsangar

Population (2006)
  - Total: 30
- Time zone: UTC+3:30 (IRST)
  - Summer (DST): UTC+4:30 (IRDT)

Posht Koreh (Persian: پشتكره, also Romanized as Posht-e Koreh) is a village in Chamsangar Rural District, Papi District, Khorramabad County, Lorestan Province, Iran. At the 2006 census, its population was 30, in 4 families.
