= Gareh, Lorestan =

Gareh, Lorestan may refer to:

- Gareh, Keshvar
- Gareh, Tang-e Haft
