= Ab Shabandar =

Ab Shabandar ابشباندر
- Village
- Location within Iran
- Coordinates: 33°16′44″N 48°52′48″E
- Country: Iran
- Province: Lorestan
- County: Khorramabad
- Bakhsh: Papi
- Rural District: Sepiddasht

Population (2006)
  - Total: 81
- Time zone: UTC+3:30 (IRST)
  - Summer (DST): UTC+4:30 (IRDT)

Ab Shabandar (Persian: ابشباندر, also Romanized as Āb Shabāndar) is a village in Sepiddasht Rural District, Papi District, Khorramabad County, Lorestan province, Iran. At the 2006 census, its population was 81 in 16 families.
