= Papadindar =

Papadindar (Persian: پاپاديندار) may refer to:

- Papadindar-e Olya
- Papadindar-e Sofla
