= Tang-e Haft =

Tang-e Haft (Persian: تنگ هفت) may refer to:

- Istgah-e Tang-e Haft
- Tang-e Haft Rural District
