= Lam-e Darish =

Lam-e Darish لمدريش
- Village
- Location within Iran
- Coordinates: 33°13′00″N 48°31′00″E
- Country: Iran
- Province: Lorestan
- County: Khorramabad
- Bakhsh: Papi
- Rural District: Keshvar

Population (2006)
  - Total: 22
- Time zone: UTC+3:30 (IRST)
  - Summer (DST): UTC+4:30 (IRDT)

Lam-e Darish (Persian: لمدريش, also Romanized as Lam-e Darīsh; also known as Lam-e Darvīsh) is a village in Keshvar Rural District, Papi District, Khorramabad County, Lorestan Province, Iran. At the 2006 census, its population was 22, in 5 families.
