= Lalari =

Lalari (Persian: للري) may refer to several places:

- Lalari Yek, a village in Tang-e Haft Rural District, Papi District, Khorramabad County, Lorestan Province, Iran
- Lalari Do, a village in Tang-e Haft Rural District, Papi District, Khorramabad County, Lorestan Province, Iran
