= Peyvast =

Peyvast پيوست
- Village
- Location within Iran
- Coordinates: 33°15′00″N 48°35′00″E
- Country: Iran
- Province: Lorestan
- County: Khorramabad
- Bakhsh: Papi
- Rural District: Keshvar

Population (2006)
  - Total: 83
- Time zone: UTC+3:30 (IRST)
  - Summer (DST): UTC+4:30 (IRDT)

Peyvast (Persian: پيوست, also known as Peyvasteh and Peyvasteh-ye Bālā) is a village in Keshvar Rural District, Papi District, Khorramabad County, Lorestan Province, Iran. At the 2006 census, its population was 83, in 21 families.
