= Keshvar =

Keshvar may refer to:

- Clime, the divisions of the inhabited portion of the Earth by geographic latitude
- Keshvar Rural District, Iran
  - Istgah-e Keshvar, a village in the Keshvar Rural District
- Persian for "realm, kingdom", such as in the (defunct) Imperial State of Iran
