= Gruni Mahdi Fuladvand =

Gruni Mahdi Fuladvand گروني مهدي فولادوند
- Village
- Country: Iran
- Province: Lorestan
- County: Khorramabad
- Bakhsh: Papi
- Rural District: Sepiddasht

Population (2006)
  - Total: 65
- Time zone: UTC+3:30 (IRST)
  - Summer (DST): UTC+4:30 (IRDT)

Gruni Mahdi Fuladvand (Persian: گروني مهدي فولادوند, also Romanized as Grūnī Mahdī Fūlādvand) is a village in Sepiddasht Rural District, Papi District, Khorramabad County, Lorestan Province, Iran. At the 2006 census, its population was 65, in 11 families.
