= Cham Shekar =

Cham Shekar چمشكر
- Village
- Location within Iran
- Coordinates: 33°11′14″N 48°49′19″E
- Country: Iran
- Province: Lorestan
- County: Khorramabad
- Bakhsh: Papi
- Rural District: Sepiddasht

Population (2006)
  - Total: 72
- Time zone: UTC+3:30 (IRST)
  - Summer (DST): UTC+4:30 (IRDT)

Cham Shekar (Persian: چمشكر, also Romanized as Cham Sheḵar) is a village in Sepiddasht Rural District, Papi District, Khorramabad County, Lorestan Province, Iran. At the 2006 census, its population was 72, in 12 families.
