= Makineh Hakumti =

Makineh Hakumti مكينه حكومتي
- Village
- Country: Iran
- Province: Lorestan
- County: Khorramabad
- Bakhsh: Papi
- Rural District: Keshvar

Population (2006)
  - Total: 25
- Time zone: UTC+3:30 (IRST)
  - Summer (DST): UTC+4:30 (IRDT)

Makineh Hakumti (Persian: مكينه حكومتي, also Romanized as Maḵīneh Haḵūmtī) is a village in Keshvar Rural District, Papi District, Khorramabad County, Lorestan Province, Iran. At the 2006 census, its population was 25, in 5 families.
