= Mohammad Kal =

Mohammad Kal محمدكل
- Village
- Location within Iran
- Coordinates: 33°05′32″N 48°32′20″E
- Country: Iran
- Province: Lorestan
- County: Khorramabad
- Bakhsh: Papi
- Rural District: Tang-e Haft

Population (2006)
  - Total: 18
- Time zone: UTC+3:30 (IRST)
  - Summer (DST): UTC+4:30 (IRDT)

Mohammad Kal (Persian: محمدكل, also Romanized as Moḩammad Kal) is a village in Tang-e Haft Rural District, Papi District, Khorramabad County, Lorestan Province, Iran. At the 2006 census, its population was 18, in 5 families.
