= Darreh Naru =

Darreh Naru دره نارو
- Village
- Location within Iran
- Coordinates: 33°13′01″N 48°49′49″E
- Country: Iran
- Province: Lorestan
- County: Khorramabad
- Bakhsh: Papi
- Rural District: Sepiddasht

Population (2006)
  - Total: 56
- Time zone: UTC+3:30 (IRST)
  - Summer (DST): UTC+4:30 (IRDT)

Darreh Naru (Persian: دره نارو, also Romanized as Darreh Nārū; also known as Darreh-ye Anārān, Darreh Anārān, and Dar-i-Anār) is a village in Sepiddasht Rural District, Papi District, Khorramabad County, Lorestan Province, Iran. At the 2006 census, its population was 56, in 12 families.
