= Chub-e Arjaneh =

Chub-e Arjaneh چوب ارجنه
- Village
- Location within Iran
- Coordinates: 33°15′35″N 48°44′15″E
- Country: Iran
- Province: Lorestan
- County: Khorramabad
- Bakhsh: Papi
- Rural District: Gerit

Population (2006)
  - Total: 34
- Time zone: UTC+3:30 (IRST)
  - Summer (DST): UTC+4:30 (IRDT)

Chub-e Arjaneh (Persian: چوب ارجنه, also Romanized as Chūb-e Arjaneh; also known as Chūb-e Arjank) is a village in Gerit Rural District, Papi District, Khorramabad County, Lorestan Province, Iran. At the 2006 census, its population was 34, in 7 families.
