= Bardeh Gar-e Do Vark =

Bardeh Gar-e Do Vark بردگر2وارك
- Village
- Location within Iran
- Coordinates: 33°10′12″N 48°40′13″E
- Country: Iran
- Province: Lorestan
- County: Khorramabad
- Bakhsh: Papi
- Rural District: Keshvar

Population (2006)
  - Total: 19
- Time zone: UTC+3:30 (IRST)
  - Summer (DST): UTC+4:30 (IRDT)

Bardeh Gar-e Do Vark (Persian: بردگر2وارك, also known as Bardeh Kar) is a village in Keshvar Rural District, Papi District, Khorramabad County, Lorestan Province, Iran. At the 2006 census, its population was 19, in 5 families.
