= Seyd-e Nar =

Village in Lorestan province, Iran

Seyd-e Nar Persian: صيدنر
- Village
- Location within Iran
- Coordinates: 33°13′58″N 48°45′48″E
- Country: Iran
- Province: Lorestan
- County: Khorramabad
- District: Papi
- Rural District: Gerit

Population (2016)
  - Total: 60
- Time zone: UTC+3:30 (IRST)

Seyd-e Nar (Persian: صيدنر) (Note: Also romanized as Şeyd-e Nar) is a village in Gerit Rural District of Papi District in Khorramabad County, Lorestan province, Iran.

== Demographics ==
=== Population ===
At the time of the 2006 National Census, the village's population was 65 in 13 households. The following census in 2011 counted 67 people in 16 households. The 2016 census measured the population of the village as 60 people in 18 households.
