= Istgah-e Bisheh =

Village in Lorestan province, Iran

Istgah-e Bisheh Persian: ايستگاه بيشه
- Village
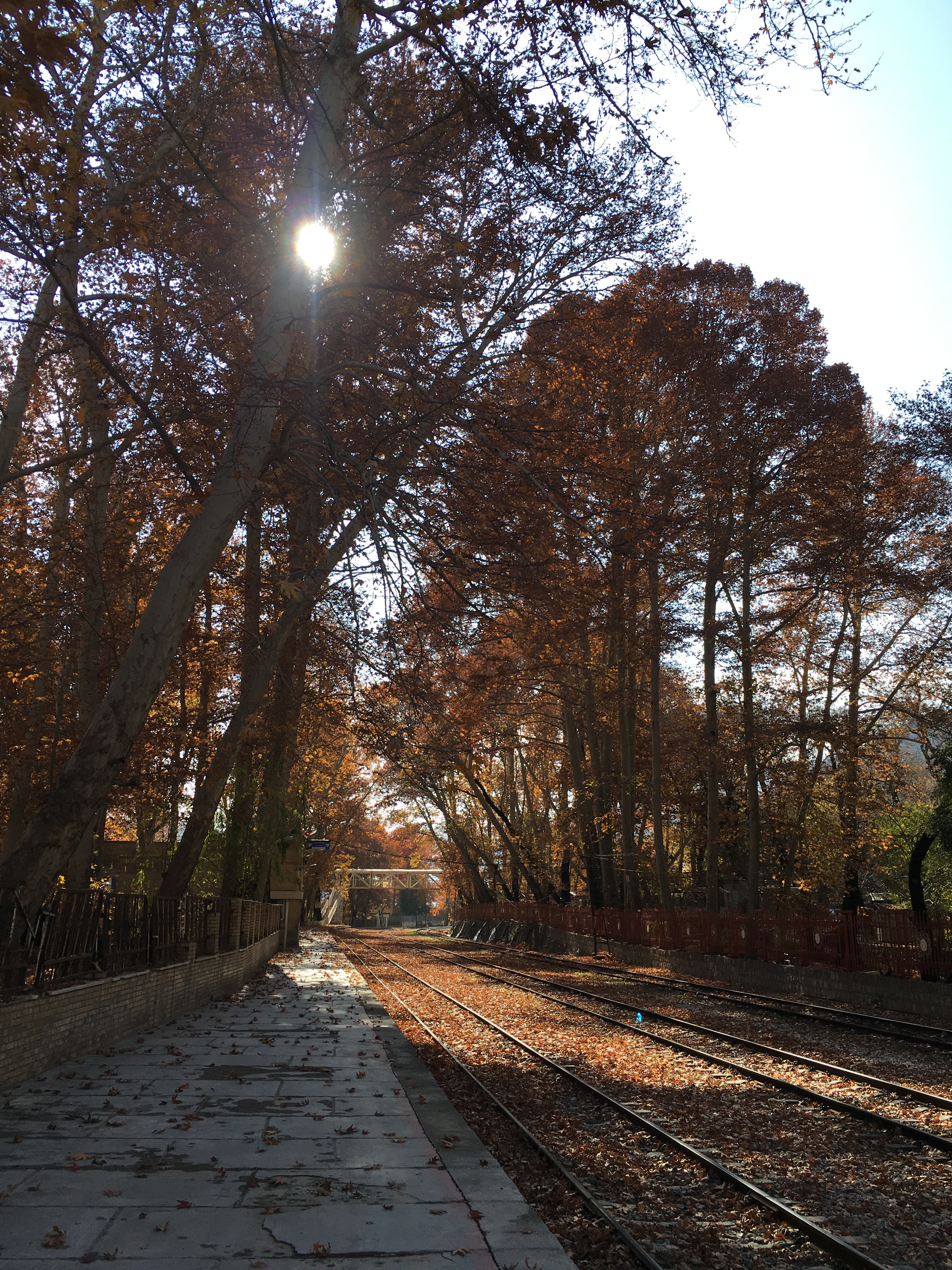
- The village of Istgah-e Bisheh

- Location within Iran
- Coordinates: 33°19′55″N 48°52′40″E
- Country: Iran
- Province: Lorestan
- County: Khorramabad
- District: Papi
- Rural District: Sepiddasht

Population (2016)
  - Total: 359
- Time zone: UTC+3:30 (IRST)

Istgah-e Bisheh (Persian: ايستگاه بيشه) (Note: Also romanized as Īstgāh-e Bīsheh; also known as Bīsheh) is a village in Sepiddasht Rural District of Papi District in Khorramabad County, Lorestan province, Iran. The Bisheh waterfall, one of Lorestan's tourist attractions, is located in the village.

== Demographics ==
=== Population ===
At the time of the 2006 National Census, the village's population was 604 in 132 households. The following census in 2011 counted 477 people in 130 households. The 2016 census measured the population of the village as 359 people in 115 households, the most populous in its rural district.
