= Deh Nasar =

Village in Lorestan province, Iran

Deh Nasar Persian: ده نسار
- Village
- Location within Iran
- Coordinates: 33°12′50″N 48°50′47″E
- Country: Iran
- Province: Lorestan
- County: Khorramabad
- District: Papi
- Rural District: Sepiddasht

Population (2016)
  - Total: 159
- Time zone: UTC+3:30 (IRST)

Deh Nasar (Persian: ده نسار) (Note: Also romanized as De Nasār) is a village in Sepiddasht Rural District of Papi District in Khorramabad County, Lorestan province, Iran.

== Demographics ==
=== Population ===
At the time of the 2006 National Census, the village's population was 179 in 34 households. The following census in 2011 counted 169 people in 33 households. The 2016 census measured the population of the village as 159 people in 40 households.
