= Gazeh, Lorestan =

Village in Lorestan province, Iran

Gazeh Persian: گازه
- Village
- Location within Iran
- Coordinates: 33°14′23″N 48°51′46″E
- Country: Iran
- Province: Lorestan
- County: Khorramabad
- District: Papi
- Rural District: Sepiddasht

Population (2016)
  - Total: 295
- Time zone: UTC+3:30 (IRST)

Gazeh (Persian: گازه) (Note: Also romanized as Gāzeh) is a village in Sepiddasht Rural District of Papi District in Khorramabad County, Lorestan province, Iran.

== Demographics ==
=== Population ===
At the time of the 2006 National Census, the village's population was 457 in 79 households. The following census in 2011 counted 324 people in 75 households. The 2016 census measured the population of the village as 295 people in 82 households.
