= Nay Angiz =

Village in Lorestan province, Iran

Nay Angiz Persian: ناي انگيز
- Village
- Location within Iran
- Coordinates: 33°19′18″N 48°44′56″E
- Country: Iran
- Province: Lorestan
- County: Khorramabad
- District: Papi
- Rural District: Gerit

Population (2016)
  - Total: 245
- Time zone: UTC+3:30 (IRST)

Nay Angiz (Persian: ناي انگيز) (Note: Also romanized as Nāy Angīz; also known as Nā’īn Gaz, Naugaz, and Now Gaz) is a village in Gerit Rural District of Papi District in Khorramabad County, Lorestan province, Iran.

== Demographics ==
=== Population ===
At the time of the 2006 National Census, the village's population was 312 in 57 households. The following census in 2011 counted 284 people in 70 households. The 2016 census measured the population of the village as 245 people in 69 households, the most populous in its rural district.
