= Khangah, Iran =

Village in Lorestan province, Iran

Khangah Persian: خانگاه
- Village
- Location within Iran
- Coordinates: 33°11′38″N 48°42′49″E
- Country: Iran
- Province: Lorestan
- County: Khorramabad
- District: Papi
- Rural District: Chamsangar

Population (2016)
  - Total: 57
- Time zone: UTC+3:30 (IRST)

Khangah (Persian: خانگاه) (Note: Also romanized as Khāngāh; formerly known as Khanqah (خانقاه), also romanized as Khānqāh; also known as Khūngeh) is a village in Chamsangar Rural District of Papi District in Khorramabad County, Lorestan province, Iran.

== Demographics ==
=== Population ===
At the time of the 2006 National Census, the village's population, as Khanqah, was 82 in 18 households. The following census in 2011 counted 59 people in 12 households, by which time the village was listed as Khangah. The 2016 census measured the population of the village as 57 people in 20 households.
