= Papadindar-e Olya =

Papadindar-e Olya پاپاديندارعليا
- Village
- Country: Iran
- Province: Lorestan
- County: Khorramabad
- Bakhsh: Papi
- Rural District: Keshvar

Population (2006)
  - Total: 20
- Time zone: UTC+3:30 (IRST)
  - Summer (DST): UTC+4:30 (IRDT)

Papadindar-e Olya (Persian: پاپاديندارعليا, also Romanized as Pāpādīndār-e ʿOlyā) is a village in Keshvar Rural District, Papi District, Khorramabad County, Lorestan Province, Iran. At the 2006 census, its population was 20, in 8 families.
