= Dehgah, Khorramabad =

Village in Lorestan province, Iran

Dehgah Persian: دهگاه
- Village
- Location within Iran
- Coordinates: 33°12′19″N 48°36′31″E
- Country: Iran
- Province: Lorestan
- County: Khorramabad
- District: Papi
- Rural District: Keshvar

Population (2016)
  - Total: 53
- Time zone: UTC+3:30 (IRST)

Dehgah (Persian: دهگاه) (Note: Also romanized as Dehgāh; also known as Degā) is a village in Keshvar Rural District of Papi District in Khorramabad County, Lorestan province, Iran.

== Demographics ==
=== Population ===
At the time of the 2006 National Census, the village's population was 118 in 21 households. The following census in 2011 counted 94 people in 18 households. The 2016 census measured the population of the village as 53 people in 12 households.
