= Sirum =

Sirum may refer to:

- SIRUM, Supporting Initiatives to Redistribute Unused Medicine, a social enterprise
- Ssireum, a Korean wrestling style
- Siruma, Camarines Sur, municipality in the Philippines
- Sirom, a village in Lorestan Province, Iran
