= Khaneh Chubi =

Village in Lorestan province, Iran

Khaneh Chubi Persian: خانه چوبي
- Village
- Location within Iran
- Coordinates: 33°14′49″N 48°29′34″E
- Country: Iran
- Province: Lorestan
- County: Khorramabad
- District: Papi
- Rural District: Keshvar

Population (2016)
  - Total: 46
- Time zone: UTC+3:30 (IRST)

Khaneh Chubi (Persian: خانه چوبي) (Note: Also romanized as Khāneh Chūbī) is a village in Keshvar Rural District of Papi District in Khorramabad County, Lorestan province, Iran.

== Demographics ==
=== Population ===
At the time of the 2006 National Census, the village's population was 26 in four households. The following census in 2011 counted 40 people in eight households. The 2016 census measured the population of the village as 46 people in 11 households.
