= Kulu, Iran =

Village in Lorestan province, Iran

Kulu Persian: كولوئ
- Village
- Country: Iran
- Province: Lorestan
- County: Khorramabad
- District: Papi
- Rural District: Chamsangar

Population (2016)
  - Total: 175
- Time zone: UTC+3:30 (IRST)

Kulu (Persian: كولوئ) (Note: Also romanized as Kūlū) is a village in Chamsangar Rural District of Papi District in Khorramabad County, Lorestan province, Iran.

== Demographics ==
=== Population ===
At the time of the 2006 National Census, the village's population was 241 in 43 households. The following census in 2011 counted 201 people in 44 households. The 2016 census measured the population of the village as 175 people in 47 households.
