= Pilegah =

Village in Lorestan province, Iran

Pilegah Persian: پيلگاه
- Village
- Location within Iran
- Country: Iran
- Province: Lorestan
- County: Khorramabad
- District: Papi
- Rural District: Keshvar

Population (2016)
  - Total: 88
- Time zone: UTC+3:30 (IRST)

Pilegah (Persian: پيلگاه) (Note: Also romanized as Pīlegāh; also known as Pīlag, Pilehgah, and Pīlehgāh) is a village in Keshvar Rural District of Papi District in Khorramabad County, Lorestan province, Iran.

== Demographics ==
=== Population ===
At the time of the 2006 National Census, the village's population was 147 in 32 households. The following census in 2011 counted 109 people in 27 households. The 2016 census measured the population of the village as 88 people in 22 households.
