= Halakadar =

Village in Lorestan province, Iran

Halakadar Persian: هلاكدر
- Village
- Location within Iran
- Country: Iran
- Province: Lorestan
- County: Khorramabad
- District: Papi
- Rural District: Keshvar

Population (2016)
  - Total: 38
- Time zone: UTC+3:30 (IRST)

Halakadar (Persian: هلاكدر) (Note: Also romanized as Halākadar) is a village in Keshvar Rural District of Papi District in Khorramabad County, Lorestan province, Iran.

== Demographics ==
=== Population ===
At the time of the 2006 National Census, the village's population was 25 in six households. The 2016 census measured the population of the village as 38 people in 10 households.
