= Pasil, Iran =

Village in Lorestan province, Iran

Pasil Persian: پسيل
- Village
- Location within Iran
- Coordinates: 33°20′51″N 48°52′29″E
- Country: Iran
- Province: Lorestan
- County: Khorramabad
- District: Papi
- Rural District: Sepiddasht

Population (2016)
  - Total: 358
- Time zone: UTC+3:30 (IRST)

Pasil (Persian: پسيل) (Note: Also romanized as Pasīl; also known as Pasīr (پسير)) is a village in Sepiddasht Rural District of Papi District in Khorramabad County, Lorestan province, Iran.

== Demographics ==
=== Population ===
At the time of the 2006 National Census, the village's population was 469 in 92 households. The following census in 2011 counted 310 people in 69 households. The 2016 census measured the population of the village as 358 people in 94 households.
