= Sirom-e Sofla =

Village in Lorestan province, Iran

Sirom-e Sofla Persian: سيرم سفلي
- Village
- Country: Iran
- Province: Lorestan
- County: Khorramabad
- District: Papi
- Rural District: Tang-e Haft

Population (2016)
  - Total: 40
- Time zone: UTC+3:30 (IRST)

Sirom-e Sofla (Persian: سيرم سفلي) (Note: Also romanized as Sīrom-e Soflá) is a village in Tang-e Haft Rural District of Papi District in Khorramabad County, Lorestan province, Iran.

== Demographics ==
=== Population ===
At the time of the 2006 National Census, the village's population was 85 in 22 households. The following census in 2011 counted 28 people in eight households. The 2016 census measured the population as 40 people in 11 households.
