= Pari Mordeh-ye Bala =

Village in Lorestan province, Iran

Pari Mordeh-ye Bala Persian: پري مرده بالا
- Village
- Location within Iran
- Coordinates: 33°17′49″N 48°43′56″E
- Country: Iran
- Province: Lorestan
- County: Khorramabad
- District: Papi
- Rural District: Gerit

Population (2016)
  - Total: 76
- Time zone: UTC+3:30 (IRST)

Pari Mordeh-ye Bala (Persian: پري مرده بالا) (Note: Also romanized as Parī Mordeh-ye Bālā; also known as Pari Mordeh) is a village in Gerit Rural District of Papi District in Khorramabad County, Lorestan province, Iran.

== Demographics ==
=== Population ===
At the time of the 2006 National Census, the village's population was 111 in 22 households. The following census in 2011 counted 103 people in 22 households. The 2016 census measured the population of the village as 76 people in 22 households.
