= Chenar Gerit =

Village in Lorestan province, Iran

Chenar Gerit Persian: چنارگريت
- Village
- Location within Iran
- Coordinates: 33°22′05″N 48°42′34″E
- Country: Iran
- Province: Lorestan
- County: Khorramabad
- District: Papi
- Rural District: Gerit

Population (2016)
  - Total: 206
- Time zone: UTC+3:30 (IRST)

Chenar Gerit (Persian: چنارگريت) (Note: Also romanized as Chenār Gerīt and Chenār-e Gerīt; also known as Chenār, Chenār Gerīk, and Chenār Khoshkeh) is a village in Gerit Rural District of Papi District in Khorramabad County, Lorestan province, Iran.

== Demographics ==
=== Population ===
At the time of the 2006 National Census, the village's population was 263 in 58 households. The following census in 2011 counted 231 people in 58 households. The 2016 census measured the population of the village as 206 people in 63 households.
