= Sirom-e Bala =

Village in Lorestan province, Iran

Sirom-e Bala Persian: سيرم بالا
- Village
- Country: Iran
- Province: Lorestan
- County: Khorramabad
- District: Papi
- Rural District: Tang-e Haft

Population (2016)
  - Total: 55
- Time zone: UTC+3:30 (IRST)

Sirom-e Bala (Persian: سيرم بالا) (Note: Also romanized as Sīrom-e Bālā; formerly known as Sirom-e Olya (سيرم عليا), also romanized as Sīrom-e ʿOlyā) is a village in Tang-e Haft Rural District of Papi District in Khorramabad County, Lorestan province, Iran.

== Demographics ==
=== Population ===
At the time of the 2006 National Census, the village's population, as Sirom-e Olya, was 44 in 10 households. The following census in 2011 counted 54 people in 16 households, by which time the village was listed as Sirom-e Bala. The 2016 census measured the population as 55 people in 14 households.
