= Chamsangar, Lorestan =

Village in Lorestan province, Iran

Chamsangar Persian: چم سنگر
- Village
- Location within Iran
- Coordinates: 33°09′53″N 48°45′38″E
- Country: Iran
- Province: Lorestan
- County: Khorramabad
- District: Papi
- Rural District: Chamsangar

Population (2016)
  - Total: 421
- Time zone: UTC+3:30 (IRST)

Chamsangar (Persian: چم سنگر) (Note: Also romanized as Cham Sangar and Cham Sanger; also known as Cham Shekar, Istgah-e-Cham Sanger (ايستگاه چم سنگر), Īstgāh-e-Cham Sanger, and Istgah-e Chamsangar) is a village in, and the capital of, Chamsangar Rural District in Papi District of Khorramabad County, Lorestan province, Iran.

== Demographics ==
=== Population ===
At the time of the 2006 National Census, the village's population was 515 in 103 households. The following census in 2011 counted 426 people in 106 households. The 2016 census measured the population of the village as 421 people in 105 households, the most populous in its rural district.
