= Qaleh-ye Khanjan =

Village in Lorestan province, Iran

Qaleh-ye Khanjan Persian: قلعه خانجان
- Village
- Location within Iran
- Coordinates: 33°18′33″N 48°42′54″E
- Country: Iran
- Province: Lorestan
- County: Khorramabad
- District: Papi
- Rural District: Gerit

Population (2016)
  - Total: 119
- Time zone: UTC+3:30 (IRST)

Qaleh-ye Khanjan (Persian: قلعه خانجان) (Note: Also romanized as Qal‘eh-ye Khānjān; also known as Khānjān Khān, Qal‘eh-ye Khānjān Khān, and Sar Tang-e Eslāmābād) is a village in, and the capital of, Gerit Rural District in Papi District of Khorramabad County, Lorestan province, Iran.

== Demographics ==
=== Population ===
At the time of the 2006 National Census, the village's population was 119 in 23 households. The following census in 2011 counted 110 people in 27 households. The 2016 census measured the population of the village as 119 people in 36 households.
