= Margad Sar =

Village in Lorestan province, Iran

Margad Sar Persian: مرگدسر
- Village
- Location within Iran
- Country: Iran
- Province: Lorestan
- County: Khorramabad
- District: Papi
- Rural District: Keshvar

Population (2016)
  - Total: 40
- Time zone: UTC+3:30 (IRST)

Margad Sar (Persian: مرگدسر) (Note: Also known as Marg Sar) is a village in Keshvar Rural District of Papi District in Khorramabad County, Lorestan province, Iran.

== Demographics ==
=== Population ===
At the time of the 2006 National Census, the village's population was 64 in 11 households. The following census in 2011 counted 47 people in nine households. The 2016 census measured the population of the village as 40 people in 11 households.
