= Mohreh Nar Mohammad =

Village in Lorestan province, Iran

Mohreh Nar Mohammad Persian: مهره نارمحمد
- Village
- Location within Iran
- Coordinates: 33°07′44″N 48°50′53″E
- Country: Iran
- Province: Lorestan
- County: Khorramabad
- District: Papi
- Rural District: Chamsangar

Population (2016)
  - Total: 50
- Time zone: UTC+3:30 (IRST)

Mohreh Nar Mohammad (Persian: مهره نارمحمد) (Note: Also romanized as Mohreh Nār Moḩammad and Mohrehnarmohammad) is a village in Chamsangar Rural District of Papi District in Khorramabad County, Lorestan province, Iran.

== Demographics ==
=== Population ===
At the time of the 2006 National Census, the village's population was 77 in 16 households. The following census in 2011 counted 53 people in 12 households. The 2016 census measured the population of the village as 50 people in 16 households.
