= Ruzmianki =

Village in Lorestan province, Iran

Ruzmianki Persian: روزميانكي
- Village
- Country: Iran
- Province: Lorestan
- County: Khorramabad
- District: Papi
- Rural District: Tang-e Haft

Population (2016)
  - Total: 59
- Time zone: UTC+3:30 (IRST)

Ruzmianki (Persian: روزميانكي) (Note: Also romanized as Rūzmīānḵī) is a village in Tang-e Haft Rural District of Papi District in Khorramabad County, Lorestan province, Iran.

== Demographics ==
=== Population ===
At the time of the 2006 National Census, the village's population was 25 in seven households. The following census in 2011 counted 83 people in 16 households. The 2016 census measured the population as 59 people in 12 households.
