= Irveh =

Village in Lorestan province, Iran

Irveh Persian: ايروه
- Village
- Location within Iran
- Coordinates: 33°13′14″N 48°50′54″E
- Country: Iran
- Province: Lorestan
- County: Khorramabad
- District: Papi
- Rural District: Sepiddasht

Population (2016)
  - Total: 188
- Time zone: UTC+3:30 (IRST)

Irveh (Persian: ايروه) (Note: Also romanized as Īrveh; also known as Īrvand) is a village in Sepiddasht Rural District of Papi District in Khorramabad County, Lorestan province, Iran.

== Demographics ==
=== Population ===
At the time of the 2006 National Census, the village's population was 216 in 43 households. The following census in 2011 counted 189 people in 42 households. The 2016 census measured the population of the village as 188 people in 44 households.
