= Now Deh, Lorestan =

Village in Lorestan province, Iran

Now Deh Persian: نوده
- Village
- Location within Iran
- Coordinates: 33°13′06″N 48°47′18″E
- Country: Iran
- Province: Lorestan
- County: Khorramabad
- District: Papi
- Rural District: Gerit

Population (2016)
  - Total: 70
- Time zone: UTC+3:30 (IRST)

Now Deh (Persian: نوده) (Note: Also known as Deh Now) is a village in Gerit Rural District of Papi District in Khorramabad County, Lorestan province, Iran.

== Demographics ==
=== Population ===
At the time of the 2006 National Census, the village's population was 75 in 14 households. The following census in 2011 counted 74 people in 13 households. The 2016 census measured the population of the village as 70 people in 14 households.
