= Darreh Hendian =

Village in Lorestan province, Iran

Darreh Hendian Persian: دره هنديان
- Village
- Location within Iran
- Coordinates: 33°08′25″N 48°49′00″E
- Country: Iran
- Province: Lorestan
- County: Khorramabad
- District: Papi
- Rural District: Chamsangar

Population (2016)
  - Total: 90
- Time zone: UTC+3:30 (IRST)

Darreh Hendian (Persian: دره هنديان) (Note: Also romanized as Darreh Hendīān, Darreh Hendīyān, and Darreh-ye Hendīān) is a village in Chamsangar Rural District of Papi District in Khorramabad County, Lorestan province, Iran.

== Demographics ==
=== Population ===
At the time of the 2006 National Census, the village's population was 102 in 21 households. The following census in 2011 counted 76 people in 22 households. The 2016 census measured the population of the village as 90 people in 16 households.
