= Ruz Gireh =

Village in Lorestan province, Iran

Ruz Gireh Persian: روزگيره
- Village
- Location within Iran
- Coordinates: 33°12′01″N 48°48′09″E
- Country: Iran
- Province: Lorestan
- County: Khorramabad
- District: Papi
- Rural District: Chamsangar

Population (2016)
  - Total: 65
- Time zone: UTC+3:30 (IRST)

Ruz Gireh (Persian: روزگيره) (Note: Also romanized as Rūz Gīreh; also known as Rūzeh Gīreh) is a village in Chamsangar Rural District of Papi District in Khorramabad County, Lorestan province, Iran.

== Demographics ==
=== Population ===
At the time of the 2006 National Census, the village's population was 134 in 19 households. The following census in 2011 counted 123 people in 22 households. The 2016 census measured the population of the village as 65 people in 14 households.
