= Bar Aftab-e Ali Asgar =

Village in Lorestan province, Iran

Bar Aftab-e Ali Asgar Persian: برافتاب علي عسگر
- Village
- Location within Iran
- Country: Iran
- Province: Lorestan
- County: Khorramabad
- District: Papi
- Rural District: Chamsangar

Population (2016)
  - Total: 164
- Time zone: UTC+3:30 (IRST)

Bar Aftab-e Ali Asgar (Persian: برافتاب علي عسگر) (Note: Also romanized as Bar Āftāb-e ʿAlī ʿAsgar; also known as Bar Āftāb-e Halākdar) is a village in Chamsangar Rural District of Papi District in Khorramabad County, Lorestan province, Iran.

== Demographics ==
=== Population ===
At the time of the 2006 National Census, the village's population was 255 in 50 households. The following census in 2011 counted 200 people in 46 households. The 2016 census measured the population of the village as 164 people in 50 households.
