= Pareh Aleh =

Village in Lorestan province, Iran

Pareh Aleh Persian: پاره اله
- Village
- Country: Iran
- Province: Lorestan
- County: Khorramabad
- District: Papi
- Rural District: Tang-e Haft

Population (2016)
  - Total: 83
- Time zone: UTC+3:30 (IRST)

Pareh Aleh (Persian: پاره اله) (Note: Also romanized as Pāreh Āleh) is a village in Tang-e Haft Rural District of Papi District in Khorramabad County, Lorestan province, Iran.

== Demographics ==
=== Population ===
At the time of the 2006 National Census, the village's population was 81 in 17 households. The following census in 2011 counted 72 people in 14 households. The 2016 census measured the population as 231 people in 53 households.
