= Sarab-e Jaldan =

Village in Lorestan province, Iran

Sarab-e Jaldan Persian: سرابجلدان
- Village
- Location within Iran
- Coordinates: 33°20′46″N 48°42′15″E
- Country: Iran
- Province: Lorestan
- County: Khorramabad
- District: Papi
- Rural District: Gerit

Population (2016)
  - Total: 103
- Time zone: UTC+3:30 (IRST)

Sarab-e Jaldan (Persian: سرابجلدان) (Note: Also romanized as Sarāb-e Jaldān; also known as Sarāb-e Jaldūn) is a village in Gerit Rural District of Papi District in Khorramabad County, Lorestan province, Iran.

== Demographics ==
=== Population ===
At the time of the 2006 National Census, the village's population was 146 in 28 households. The following census in 2011 counted 110 people in 25 households. The 2016 census measured the population of the village as 103 people in 20 households.
