= Larkeh =

Village in Lorestan province, Iran

Larkeh Persian: لاركه
- Village
- Location within Iran
- Coordinates: 33°11′48″N 48°52′10″E
- Country: Iran
- Province: Lorestan
- County: Khorramabad
- District: Papi
- Rural District: Sepiddasht

Population (2016)
  - Total: 186
- Time zone: UTC+3:30 (IRST)

Larkeh (Persian: لاركه) (Note: Also romanized as Lārkeh) is a village in Sepiddasht Rural District of Papi District in Khorramabad County, Lorestan province, Iran.

== Demographics ==
=== Population ===
At the time of the 2006 National Census, the village's population was 285 in 43 households. The following census in 2011 counted 212 people in 40 households. The 2016 census measured the population of the village as 186 people in 36 households.
