= Chenar Shureh =

Village in Lorestan province, Iran

Chenar Shureh Persian: چنارشوره
- Village
- Location within Iran
- Coordinates: 33°14′49″N 48°46′57″E
- Country: Iran
- Province: Lorestan
- County: Khorramabad
- District: Papi
- Rural District: Gerit

Population (2016)
  - Total: 82
- Time zone: UTC+3:30 (IRST)

Chenar Shureh (Persian: چنارشوره) (Note: Also romanized as Chenār Shūreh) is a village in Gerit Rural District of Papi District in Khorramabad County, Lorestan province, Iran.

== Demographics ==
=== Population ===
At the time of the 2006 National Census, the village's population was 154 in 32 households. The following census in 2011 counted 120 people in 28 households. The 2016 census measured the population of the village as 82 people in 27 households.
