= Tang-e Panj =

Village in Lorestan province, Iran

Tang-e Panj Persian: تنگ پنج
- Village
- Location within Iran
- Coordinates: 32°56′39″N 48°44′47″E
- Country: Iran
- Province: Lorestan
- County: Khorramabad
- District: Papi
- Rural District: Tang-e Haft

Population (2016)
  - Total: 231
- Time zone: UTC+3:30 (IRST)

Tang-e Panj (Persian: تنگ پنج) (Note: Also romanized as Tang Panj and Tang-i-Panj; also known as Nīk Panch) is a village in Tang-e Haft Rural District of Papi District in Khorramabad County, Lorestan province, Iran.

== Demographics ==
=== Population ===
At the time of the 2006 National Census, the village's population was 467 in 98 households. The following census in 2011 counted 651 people in 126 households. The 2016 census measured the population at 231 people in 53 households, the most populous in its rural district.
