= Shabandar =

Village in Lorestan province, Iran

Shabandar Persian: شباندر
- Village
- Location within Iran
- Coordinates: 33°17′23″N 48°50′07″E
- Country: Iran
- Province: Lorestan
- County: Khorramabad
- District: Papi
- Rural District: Sepiddasht

Population (2016)
  - Total: 194
- Time zone: UTC+3:30 (IRST)

Shabandar (Persian: شباندر) (Note: Also romanized as Shaban Dar and Sha‘bāndar; also known as Shab Bīdār and Shab Dar) is a village in Sepiddasht Rural District of Papi District in Khorramabad County, Lorestan province, Iran.

== Demographics ==
=== Population ===
At the time of the 2006 National Census, the village's population was 249 in 50 households. The following census in 2011 counted 174 people in 42 households. The 2016 census measured the population of the village as 194 people in 60 households.
