= Bar Aftab-e Howmeh =

Village in Lorestan province, Iran

Bar Aftab-e Howmeh Persian: برافتاب حومه
- Village
- Location within Iran
- Coordinates: 33°08′19″N 48°50′29″E
- Country: Iran
- Province: Lorestan
- County: Khorramabad
- District: Papi
- Rural District: Chamsangar

Population (2016)
  - Total: 57
- Time zone: UTC+3:30 (IRST)

Bar Aftab-e Howmeh (Persian: برافتاب حومه) (Note: Also romanized as Bar Āftāb-e Ḩowmeh, Bar Aftab-e Humeh, and Bar Āftāb-e Ḩūmeh; also known as Barāftāb-e Homeh) is a village in Chamsangar Rural District of Papi District in Khorramabad County, Lorestan province, Iran.

== Demographics ==
=== Population ===
At the time of the 2006 National Census, the village's population was 93 in 15 households. The following census in 2011 counted 77 people in 13 households. The 2016 census measured the population of the village as 57 people in 12 households.
