= Sang Tarashan =

Sang Tarashan and Sang Tarashun (Persian: سنگ تراشان) may refer to:

- Sang Tarashan, Lorestan
- Sang Tarashan, Mazandaran
- Sang Tarashan, Tehran
