= Tazan =

Village in Lorestan province, Iran

Tazan Persian: تازان
- Village
- Location within Iran
- Coordinates: 33°08′55″N 48°35′13″E
- Country: Iran
- Province: Lorestan
- County: Khorramabad
- District: Papi
- Rural District: Keshvar

Population (2016)
  - Total: 86
- Time zone: UTC+3:30 (IRST)

Tazan (Persian: تازان) (Note: Also romanized as Tāzān; also known as Tārūn-e ‘Olyā and Tāzān-e ‘Olyā) is a village in Keshvar Rural District of Papi District in Khorramabad County, Lorestan province, Iran.

== Demographics ==
=== Population ===
At the time of the 2006 National Census, the village's population was 72 in 17 households. The following census in 2011 counted 69 people in 16 households. The 2016 census measured the population of the village as 86 people in 22 households.
