= Zaliab, Khorramabad =

Village in Lorestan province, Iran

Zaliab Persian: زالياب
- Village
- Location within Iran
- Coordinates: 33°20′43″N 48°45′01″E
- Country: Iran
- Province: Lorestan
- County: Khorramabad
- District: Papi
- Rural District: Gerit

Population (2016)
  - Total: 177
- Time zone: UTC+3:30 (IRST)

Zaliab (Persian: زالياب) (Note: Also romanized as Zālīāb; also known as Zālīābād) is a village in Gerit Rural District of Papi District in Khorramabad County, Lorestan province, Iran.

== Demographics ==
=== Population ===
At the time of the 2006 National Census, the village's population was 285 in 51 households. The following census in 2011 counted 232 people in 56 households. The 2016 census measured the population of the village as 177 people in 55 households.
