= Tang-e Haft, Lorestan =

Village in Lorestan province, Iran

Istgah-e Tang-e Haft Persian: تنگ پنج
- Village
- Location within Iran
- Coordinates: 33°02′38″N 48°40′21″E
- Country: Iran
- Province: Lorestan
- County: Khorramabad
- District: Papi
- Rural District: Tang-e Haft

Population (2016)
  - Total: 204
- Time zone: UTC+3:30 (IRST)

Istgah-e Tang-e Haft (Persian: ايستگاه تنگ هفت) (Note: Also romanized as Īstgāh-e Tang-e Haft; also known as Tang-e Haft and Tang-i-Haft) is a village in, and the capital of, Tang-e Haft Rural District in Papi District of Khorramabad County, Lorestan province, Iran.

== Demographics ==
=== Population ===
At the time of the 2006 National Census, the village's population was 408 in 109 households. The following census in 2011 counted 367 people in 105 households. The 2016 census measured the population of the village as 204 people in 56 households.
