= Sirom =

Village in Lorestan province, Iran

Sirom Persian: سيرم
- Village
- Location within Iran
- Country: Iran
- Province: Lorestan
- County: Khorramabad
- District: Papi
- Rural District: Tang-e Haft

Population (2016)
  - Total: 97
- Time zone: UTC+3:30 (IRST)

Sirom (Persian: سيرم) (Note: Also romanized as Sīrom; also known as Sīrūm) is a village in Tang-e Haft Rural District of Papi District in Khorramabad County, Lorestan province, Iran.

== Demographics ==
=== Population ===
At the time of the 2006 National Census, the village's population was 31 in eight households. The following census in 2011 counted 97 people in 30 households. The 2016 census measured the population as 97 people in 27 households.
