= Istgah-e Keshvar =

Village in Lorestan province, Iran

Istgah-e Keshvar Persian: ايستگاه كشور
- Village
- Location within Iran
- Coordinates: 33°08′06″N 48°38′24″E
- Country: Iran
- Province: Lorestan
- County: Khorramabad
- District: Papi
- Rural District: Keshvar

Population (2016)
  - Total: 127
- Time zone: UTC+3:30 (IRST)

Istgah-e Keshvar (Persian: ايستگاه كشور) (Note: Also romanized as Īstgāh-e Keshvar; also known as Keshvar and Keshwar) is a village in, and the capital of, Keshvar Rural District in Papi District of Khorramabad County, Lorestan province, Iran.

== Demographics ==
=== Population ===
At the time of the 2006 National Census, the village's population was 214 in 52 households. The following census in 2011 counted 178 people in 44 households. The 2016 census measured the population of the village as 127 people in 35 households.
