= Sepiddasht, Lorestan =

City in Lorestan province, Iran

Sepiddasht Persian: سپيددشت
- City
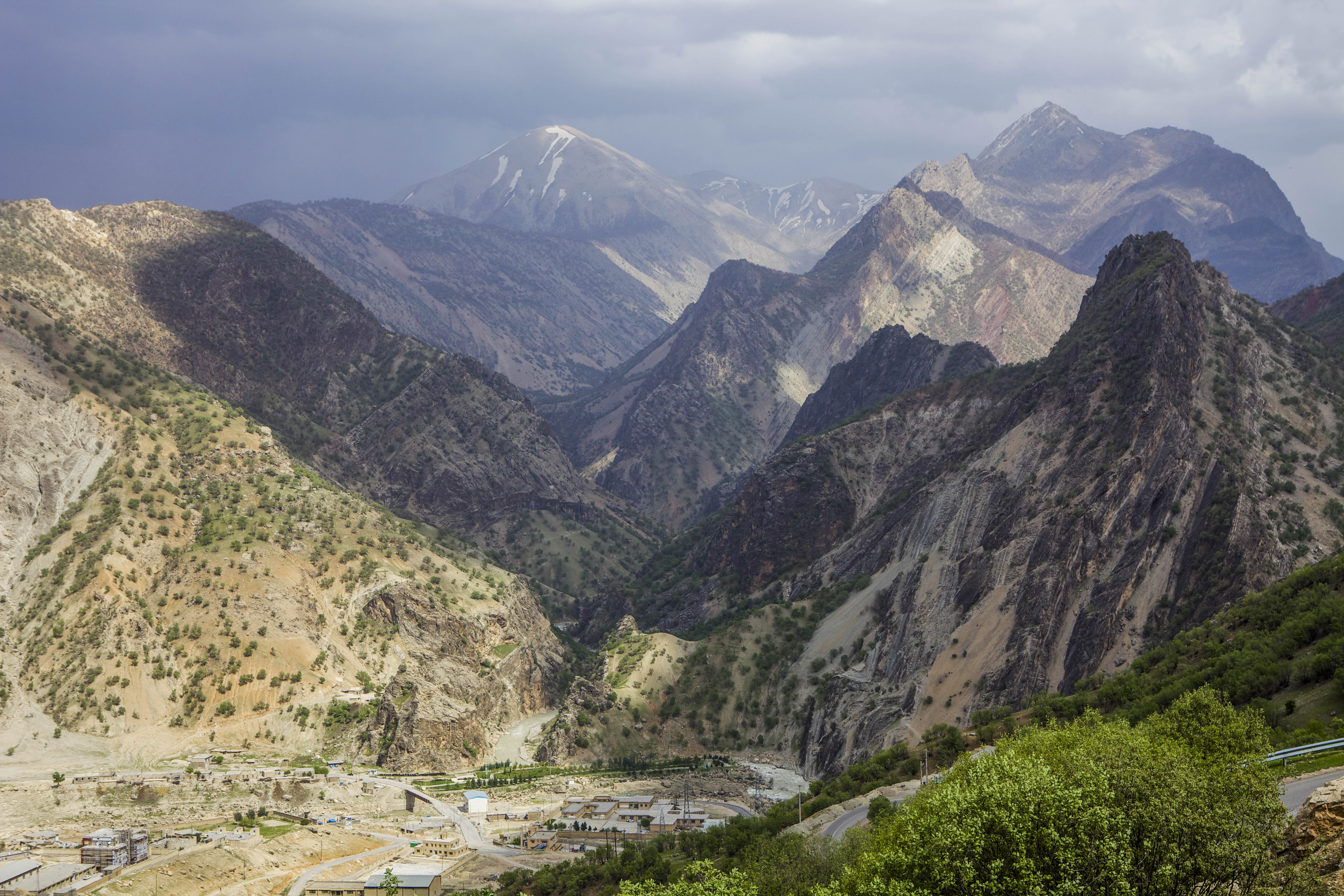

- Location within Iran
- Coordinates: 33°13′07″N 48°53′00″E
- Country: Iran
- Province: Lorestan
- County: Khorramabad
- District: Papi

Population (2016)
  - Total: 2,917
- Time zone: UTC+3:30 (IRST)

Sepiddasht (Persian: سپيددشت) (Note: Also romanized as Sepīd Dasht; also known as Īstgāh-e Sepīd Dasht and Sefīd Dasht) is a city in, and the capital of, Papi District in Khorramabad County, Lorestan province, Iran. It also serves as the administrative center for Sepiddasht Rural District.

== Demographics ==
=== Population ===
At the time of the 2006 National Census, the city's population was 683 households. The following census in 2011 counted 2,545 people in 649 households. The 2016 census measured the population of the city as 2,917 people in 809 households.

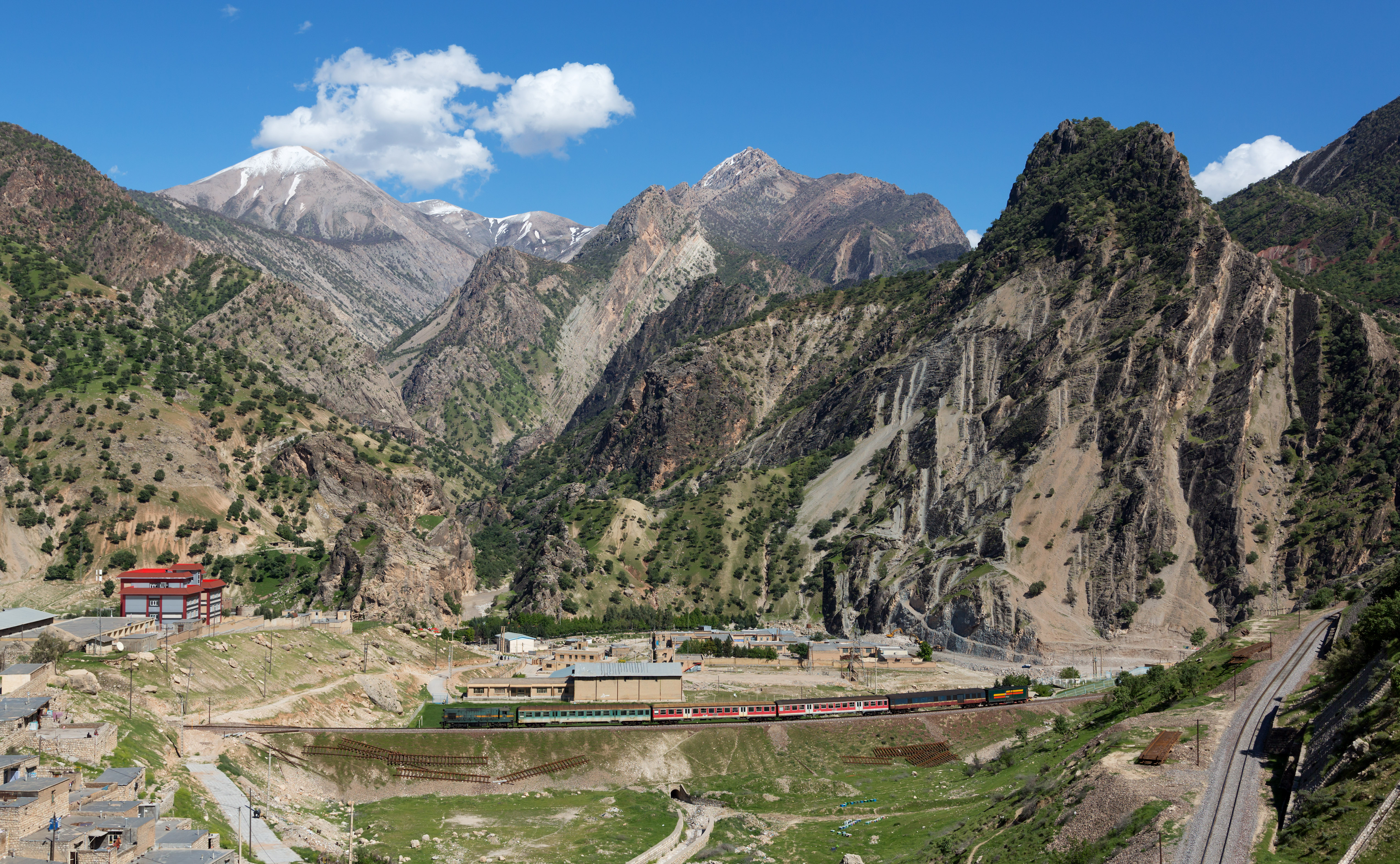
Valley with train
