= Bisheh Waterfall =

Waterfall in Dorud County, Iran

Coordinates: 33.330490°N 48.878256°E

- آبشار بیشه دورود
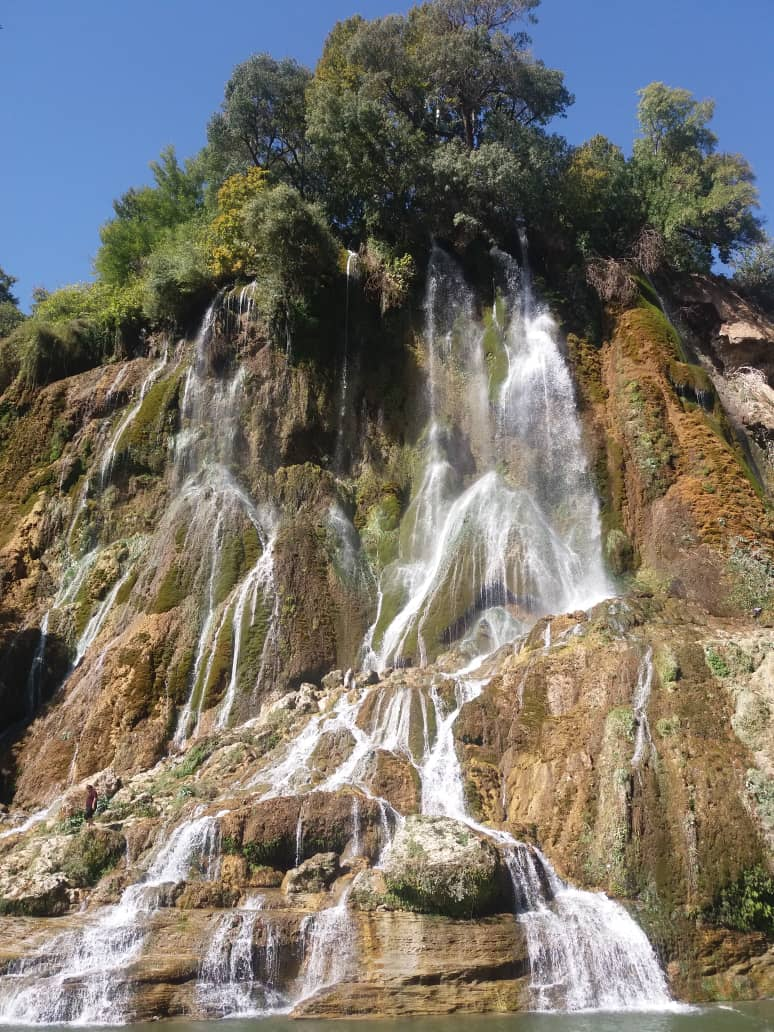
- Bisheh Waterfall
- Interactive map of Bisheh Waterfall
- Location: Istgah-e Bisheh, Central District, Khorramabad County, Lorestan Province, Iran
- Longest drop: 48 metres (157 ft)
- Total width: 10

Bisheh Waterfall (Persian: آبشار بیشه; Luri: آوشار بیشَه) is a waterfall in the village of Istgah-e Bisheh, Central District in Khorramabad County, Iran. Bisheh waterfall, is the 48th national monument that was included in Iran's natural heritage list by the Cultural Heritage Organization on March 27, 2008.

== Description ==
Bisheh Waterfall is about 48 m (157 ft) in height, and about 10 m (33 ft) wide where it joins the Sezar River. The waterfall, with the nearby oak forest, is a popular tourist attraction because of its scenic location and nearby train station.

The name of Bisheh Waterfall is taken from Bisheh Village. The people of this village speak Khorramabadi Luri and Bakhtiyari Luri.

== Access path ==
It is 30 kilometers southeast of Durood. By train, with the Durood railway route, it is about 35 minutes. By car It is 130 km away from Durood. This waterfall is located next to the Bisheh railway station on the south-Tehran route. Access to this waterfall by car is through Khorram Abad city, which is about 60 kilometers. The asphalt access road is through Khoramabad city in the heart of the Zagros mountains and in the Papi section.

== See also ==
- List of waterfalls
