= Sang Tarashan, Lorestan =

Village in Lorestan province, Iran

Sang Tarashan Persian: سنگتراشان
- Village
- Location within Iran
- Coordinates: 33°13′53″N 48°33′37″E
- Country: Iran
- Province: Lorestan
- County: Khorramabad
- District: Papi
- Rural District: Keshvar

Population (2016)
  - Total: 169
- Time zone: UTC+3:30 (IRST)

Sang Tarashan (Persian: سنگتراشان) (Note: Also romanized as Sang Tarāshān; also known as Nowzhīyān and Nūzhīān) is a village in Keshvar Rural District of Papi District in Khorramabad County, Lorestan province, Iran.

== Demographics ==
=== Population ===
At the time of the 2006 National Census, the village's population was 241 in 52 households. The following census in 2011 counted 189 people in 40 households. The 2016 census measured the population of the village as 169 people in 47 households, the most populous in its rural district.
