= Lalari Yek =

Village in Lorestan province, Iran

Lalari Yek Persian: للري يك
- Village
- Location within Iran
- Country: Iran
- Province: Lorestan
- County: Khorramabad
- District: Papi
- Rural District: Tang-e Haft

Population (2016)
  - Total: 99
- Time zone: UTC+3:30 (IRST)

Lalari Yek (Persian: للري يك) (Note: Also romanized as Lalarī Yeḵ; also known as Lalarī) is a village in Tang-e Haft Rural District of Papi District in Khorramabad County, Lorestan province, Iran.

== Demographics ==
=== Population ===
At the time of the 2006 National Census, the village's population was 103 in 23 households. The following census in 2011 counted 79 people in 22 households. The 2016 census measured the population as 99 people in 27 households.
