= Gereh Cheqa, Ilam =

Village in Ilam, Iran

Gereh Cheqa گره چقا
- Village
- Location within Iran
- Coordinates: 33°40′02″N 45°59′41″E
- Country: Iran
- Province: Ilam
- County: Ilam
- Bakhsh: Chavar
- Rural District: Boli

Population (2006)
  - Total: 90
- Time zone: UTC+3:30 (IRST)
  - Summer (DST): UTC+4:30 (IRDT)

Gereh Cheqa (Persian: گره چقا, also Romanized as Gereh Cheqā) is a village in Boli Rural District, Chavar District, Ilam County, Ilam Province, Iran. At the 2006 census, its population was 90, in 22 families. The village is populated by Kurds.
