= Gorgeh Choqa =

Gorgeh Choqa گرگه چقا
- Village
- Location within Iran
- Coordinates: 34°25′47″N 46°54′34″E
- Country: Iran
- Province: Kermanshah
- County: Kermanshah
- Bakhsh: Central
- Rural District: Baladarband

Population (2006)
  - Total: 15
- Time zone: UTC+3:30 (IRST)
  - Summer (DST): UTC+4:30 (IRDT)

Gorgeh Choqa (Persian: گرگه چقا, also Romanized as Gorgeh Choqā and Gargeh Cheqā; also known as Gareh Choqā) is a village in Baladarband Rural District, in the Central District of Kermanshah County, Kermanshah Province, Iran. At the 2006 census, its population was 15, in 4 families.
