= Gereh Cheqa, Kurdistan =

Gereh Cheqa گره چقا
- Village
- Country: Iran
- Province: Kurdistan
- County: Bijar
- Bakhsh: Korani
- Rural District: Gorgin

Population (2006)
  - Total: 36
- Time zone: UTC+3:30 (IRST)
  - Summer (DST): UTC+4:30 (IRDT)

Gereh Cheqa (Persian: گره چقا, also Romanized as Gereh Cheqā) is a village in Gorgin Rural District, Korani District, Bijar County, Kurdistan province, Iran. At the 2006 census, its population was 36, in 6 families. The village is populated by Azerbaijanis.
