= Zaliab, Kuhdasht =

Zaliab ذالياب
- Village
- Location within Iran
- Coordinates: 33°27′00″N 47°41′00″E
- Country: Iran
- Province: Lorestan
- County: Kuhdasht
- Bakhsh: Central
- Rural District: Kuhdasht-e Jonubi

Population (2006)
  - Total: 405
- Time zone: UTC+3:30 (IRST)
  - Summer (DST): UTC+4:30 (IRDT)

Zaliab (Persian: ذالياب, also Romanized as Zālīāb and Z̄ālī Āb; also known as Z̄ālyāb-e Eslāmābād) is a village in Kuhdasht-e Jonubi Rural District, in the Central District of Kuhdasht County, Lorestan Province, Iran. At the 2006 census, its population was 405, in 84 families.
