= Gareh, Fars =

Gareh گاره
- Village
- Location within Iran
- Coordinates: 28°57′47″N 53°09′13″E
- Country: Iran
- Province: Fars
- County: Khafr
- Bakhsh: Central
- Rural District: Aliabad

Population (2016)
  - Total: 188
- Time zone: UTC+3:30 (IRST)

Gareh (Persian: گاره, also Romanized as Gāreh) is a village in Aliabad Rural District of Khafr County, Fars province, Iran.

At the 2006 census, its population was 150 people, when it was in Khafr District, Jahrom County. The 2016 census measured the population of the village as 188 people in 63 households.

In 2019, the district was separated from the county in the establishment of Khafr County, and the rural district was transferred to the new Central District.
