= Garreh Nazerabad =

Garreh Nazerabad گره نظراباد
- Village
- Location within Iran
- Coordinates: 30°26′29″N 51°22′03″E
- Country: Iran
- Province: Fars
- County: Rostam
- Bakhsh: Sorna
- Rural District: Poshtkuh-e Rostam

Population (2006)
  - Total: 90
- Time zone: UTC+3:30 (IRST)
  - Summer (DST): UTC+4:30 (IRDT)

Garreh Nazerabad (Persian: گره نظراباد, also Romanized as Garreh Naz̧erābād; also known as Chehel Gereh, Gareh, and Garreh) is a village in Poshtkuh-e Rostam Rural District, Sorna District, Rostam County, Fars province, Iran. At the 2006 census, its population was 90, in 18 families.
