= Chamsangar Rural District =

Rural district in Lorestan province, Iran

Chamsangar Rural District Persian: دهستان چم سنگر
- Rural District
- Location within Iran
- Coordinates: 33°09′47″N 48°45′20″E
- Country: Iran
- Province: Lorestan
- County: Khorramabad
- District: Papi
- Established: 1987
- Capital: Chamsangar

Population (2016)
  - Total: 1,675
- Time zone: UTC+3:30 (IRST)

Chamsangar Rural District (Persian: دهستان چم سنگر) is in Papi District of Khorramabad County, Lorestan province, Iran. Its capital is the village of Chamsangar.

== Demographics ==
=== Population ===
At the time of the 2006 National Census, the rural district's population was 2,520 in 455 households. There were 1,942 inhabitants in 418 households at the following census of 2011. The 2016 census measured the population of the rural district as 1,675 in 439 households. The most populous of its 45 villages was Chamsangar, with 421 people.

=== Other villages in the rural district ===
- Bar Aftab-e Ali Asgar
- Bar Aftab-e Howmeh
- Darreh Hendian
- Khangah
- Kulu
- Mohreh Nar Mohammad
- Ruz Gireh
