= Gerit Rural District =

Rural district in Lorestan province, Iran

Gerit Rural District Persian: دهستان گريت
- Rural District
- Location within Iran
- Coordinates: 33°18′N 48°43′E
- Country: Iran
- Province: Lorestan
- County: Khorramabad
- District: Papi
- Established: 1993
- Capital: Qaleh-ye Khanjan

Population (2016)
  - Total: 1,539
- Time zone: UTC+3:30 (IRST)

Gerit Rural District (Persian: دهستان گريت) is in Papi District of Khorramabad County, Lorestan province, Iran. Its capital is the village of Qaleh-ye Khanjan. (Note: Also known as Sar Tang-e Eslamabad)

== Demographics ==
=== Population ===
At the time of the 2006 National Census, the rural district's population was 2,145 in 418 households. There were 1,876 inhabitants in 452 households at the following census of 2011. The 2016 census measured the population of the rural district as 1,539 in 445 households. The most populous of its 32 villages was Nay Angiz, with 245 people.

=== Other villages in the rural district ===
- Chenar Gerit
- Chenar Shureh
- Now Deh
- Pari Mordeh-ye Bala
- Sarab-e Jaldan
- Seyd-e Nar
- Zaliab
