= Sepiddasht Rural District =

Rural district in Lorestan province, Iran

Sepiddasht Rural District Persian: دهستان سپيددشت
- Rural District
- Location within Iran
- Coordinates: 33°15′N 48°52′E
- Country: Iran
- Province: Lorestan
- County: Khorramabad
- District: Papi
- Established: 1987
- Capital: Sepiddasht

Population (2016)
  - Total: 3,610
- Time zone: UTC+3:30 (IRST)

Sepiddasht Rural District (Persian: دهستان سپيددشت) is in Papi District of Khorramabad County, Lorestan province, Iran. It is administered from the city of Sepiddasht.

== Demographics ==
=== Population ===
At the time of the 2006 National Census, the rural district's population was 5,117 in 936 households. There were 3,741 inhabitants in 822 households at the following census of 2011. The 2016 census measured the population of the rural district as 3,610 in 955 households. The most populous of its 40 villages was Istgah-e Bisheh, with 359 people.

=== Other villages in the rural district ===
- Deh Nasar
- Gazeh
- Irveh
- Larkeh
- Pasil
- Shabandar
