= Tang-e Haft Rural District =

Rural district in Lorestan province, Iran

Tang-e Haft Rural District Persian: دهستان تنگ هفت
- Rural District
- Location within Iran
- Coordinates: 33°02′N 48°37′E
- Country: Iran
- Province: Lorestan
- County: Khorramabad
- District: Papi
- Established: 1993
- Capital: Istgah-e Tang-e Haft

Population (2016)
  - Total: 1,257
- Time zone: UTC+3:30 (IRST)

Tang-e Haft Rural District (Persian: دهستان تنگ هفت) is in Papi District of Khorramabad County, Lorestan province, Iran. Its capital is the village of Istgah-e Tang-e Haft.

== Demographics ==
=== Population ===
At the time of the 2006 National Census, the rural district's population was 2,046 in 464 households. There were 2,031 inhabitants in 449 households at the following census of 2011. The 2016 census measured the population of the rural district as 1,257 in 316 households. The most populous of its 51 villages was Tang-e Panj, with 231 people.

=== Other villages in the rural district ===
- Lalari Yek
- Pareh Aleh
- Ruzmianki
- Sirom
- Sirom-e Bala
- Sirom-e Sofla
