= Keshvar Rural District =

Rural district in Lorestan province, Iran

Keshvar Rural District Persian: دهستان كشور
- Rural District
- Location within Iran
- Coordinates: 33°12′N 48°34′E
- Country: Iran
- Province: Lorestan
- County: Khorramabad
- District: Papi
- Established: 1987
- Capital: Istgah-e Keshvar

Population (2016)
  - Total: 1,206
- Time zone: UTC+3:30 (IRST)

Keshvar Rural District (Persian: دهستان كشور) is in Papi District of Khorramabad County, Lorestan province, Iran. Its capital is the village of Istgah-e Keshvar.

== Demographics ==
=== Population ===
At the time of the 2006 National Census, the rural district's population was 1,873 in 418 households. There were 1,379 inhabitants in 316 households at the following census of 2011. The 2016 census measured the population of the rural district as 1,206 in 322 households. The most populous of its 61 villages was Sang Tarashan, with 169 people.

=== Other villages in the rural district ===
- Dehgah
- Halakadar
- Khaneh Chubi
- Margad Sar
- Pilegah
- Tazan
