= Papi District =

District in Lorestan province, Iran

Papi District Persian: بخش پاپی
- District
- Location within Iran
- Coordinates: 33°09′N 48°39′E
- Country: Iran
- Province: Lorestan
- County: Khorramabad
- Capital: Sepiddasht

Population (2016)
  - Total: 12,204
- Time zone: UTC+3:30 (IRST)

Papi District (Persian: بخش پاپی) is in Khorramabad County, Lorestan province, Iran. Its capital is the city of Sepiddasht.

== Demographics ==
=== Population ===
At the time of the 2006 National Census, the district's population was 16,898 in 3,374 households. The following census in 2011 counted 13,514 people in 3,106 households. The 2016 census measured the population of the district as 12,204 inhabitants in 3,286 households.

=== Administrative divisions ===
Papi District Population
Administrative Divisions	2006	2011	2016
Chamsangar RD	2,520	1,942	1,675
Gerit RD	2,145	1,876	1,539
Keshvar RD	1,873	1,379	1,206
Sepiddasht RD	5,117	3,741	3,610
Tang-e Haft RD	2,046	2,031	1,257
Sepiddasht (city)	3,197	2,545	2,917
Total	16,898	13,514	12,204
RD = Rural District
