= Pirkeh =

Pirkeh (Persian: پيرکه) may refer to:

- Pirkeh-ye Olya
- Pirkeh-ye Sofla
