= Shotor Mel =

Shotor Mel or Shotormel or Shotor Mol (Persian: شترمل) may refer to:

- Shotor Mol, Kurdistan
- Shotor Mel, Lorestan
- Shotor Mel-e Olya-ye Rahmat, Lorestan
