= Garmurt =

Garmurt (Persian: گرمورت) may refer to:

- Garmurt-e Nosrati
- Garmurt-e Ramazanabad
