= Malek Mirzacham Dashti =

Village in Lorestan province, Iran

Malek Mirzacham Dashti Persian: ملك ميرزاچم دشتي
- Village
- Location within Iran
- Coordinates: 33°42′59″N 47°47′32″E
- Country: Iran
- Province: Lorestan
- County: Chegeni
- District: Shahivand
- Rural District: Kashkan-e Shomali

Population (2016)
  - Total: 221
- Time zone: UTC+3:30 (IRST)

Malek Mirzacham Dashti (Persian: ملك ميرزاچم دشتي) (Note: Also romanized as Maleḵ Mīrzācham Dashtī) is a village in Kashkan-e Shomali Rural District (Note: Formerly Kashkan Rural District) of Shahivand District in Chegeni County, (Note: Formerly Dowreh County) Lorestan province, Iran.

== Demographics ==
=== Population ===
At the time of the 2006 National Census, the village's population was 195 in 36 households, when it was in Kashkan Rural District (Note: Renamed Kashkan-e Shomali Rural District) of the former Dowreh-ye Chegeni District in Khorramabad County. The following census in 2011 counted 191 people in 46 households, by which time the district had been separated from the county in the establishment of Dowreh County. (Note: Renamed Chegeni County) The rural district was transferred to the new Shahivand District and renamed Kashkan-e Shomali Rural District. The 2016 census measured the population of the village as 221 people in 60 households.
