= Kashkan =

Kashkan (Persian: كشكان) may refer to:

- Kashkan River, a river located in the west of Iran,
- Kashkan, an Indian restaurant in Dubai Festival City Mall.
- Kashkan Rural District, a former administrative division of Khorramabad County, Lorestan province, Iran
- Kashkan-e Jonubi Rural District, an administrative division of Dowreh County, Lorestan province, Iran
- Kashkan-e Shomali Rural District, an administrative division of Dowreh County, Lorestan province, Iran
