= Sheykh Gol =

Village in Lorestan province, Iran

Sheykh Gol Persian: شيخ گل
- Village
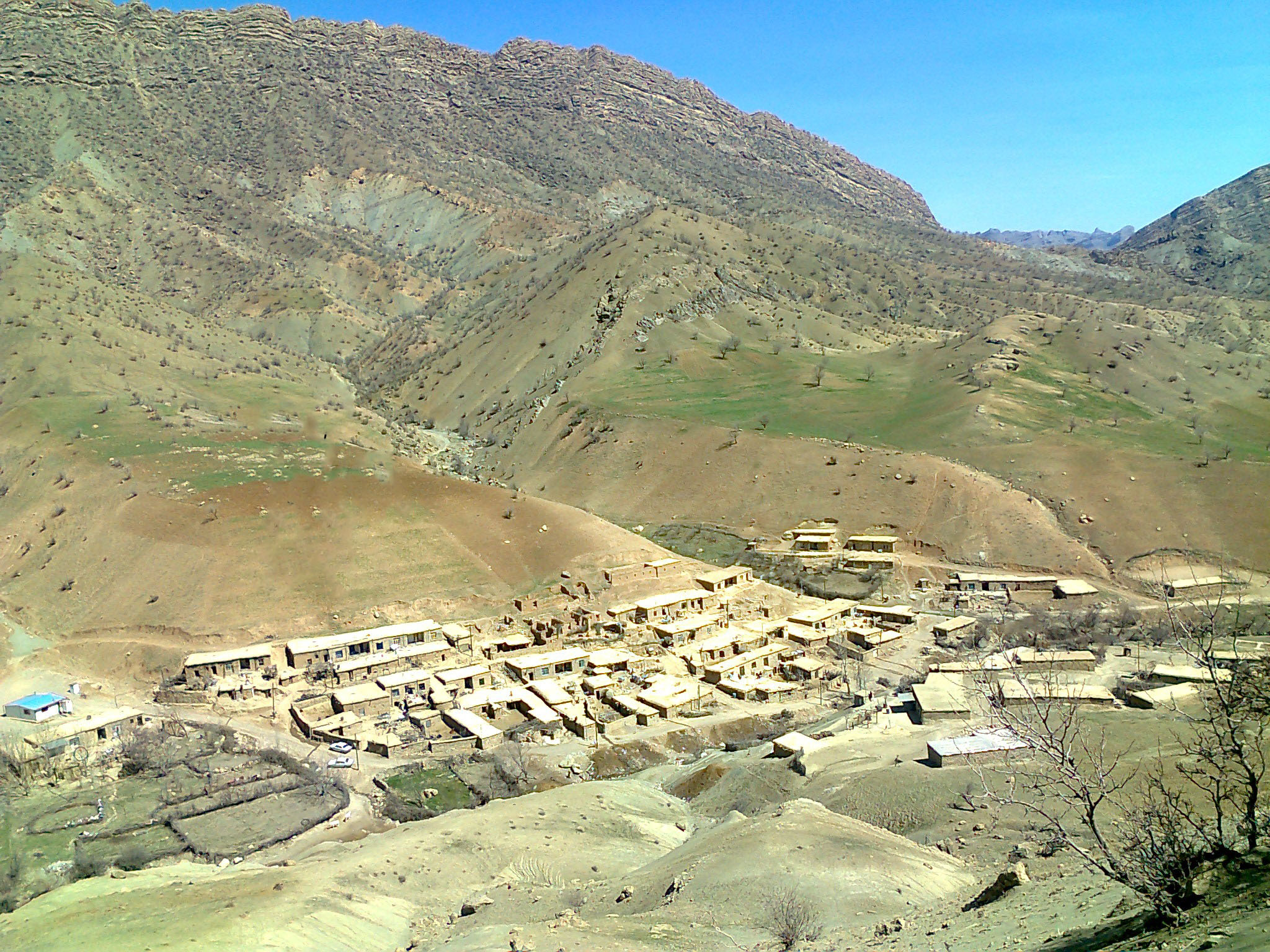
- The village of Sheykh Gol

- Location within Iran
- Coordinates: 33°48′36″N 47°48′09″E
- Country: Iran
- Province: Lorestan
- County: Chegeni
- District: Shahivand
- Rural District: Kashkan-e Shomali

Population (2016)
  - Total: 122
- Time zone: UTC+3:30 (IRST)

Sheykh Gol (Persian: شيخ گل) (Note: Also romanized as Sheykh Kal) is a village in Kashkan-e Shomali Rural District (Note: Formerly Kashkan Rural District) of Shahivand District in Chegeni County, (Note: Formerly Dowreh County) Lorestan province, Iran.

== Demographics ==
=== Population ===
At the time of the 2006 National Census, the village's population was 129 in 27 households, when it was in Kashkan Rural District (Note: Renamed Kashkan-e Shomali Rural District) of the former Dowreh-ye Chegeni District in Khorramabad County. The following census in 2011 counted 117 people in 26 households, by which time the district had been separated from the county in the establishment of Dowreh County. (Note: Renamed Chegeni County) The rural district was transferred to the new Shahivand District and renamed Kashkan-e Shomali Rural District. The 2016 census measured the population of the village as 122 people in 34 households.
