= Khaneh Sorkh =

Village in Lorestan province, Iran

Khaneh Sorkh Persian: خانه سرخ
- Village
- Location within Iran
- Coordinates: 33°40′56″N 47°48′45″E
- Country: Iran
- Province: Lorestan
- County: Chegeni
- District: Shahivand
- Rural District: Kashkan-e Shomali

Population (2016)
  - Total: 772
- Time zone: UTC+3:30 (IRST)

Khaneh Sorkh (Persian: خانه سرخ) (Note: Also romanized as Khāneh Sorkh) is a village in Kashkan-e Shomali Rural District (Note: Formerly Kashkan Rural District) of Shahivand District in Chegeni County, (Note: Formerly Dowreh County) Lorestan province, Iran.

== Demographics ==
=== Population ===
At the time of the 2006 National Census, the village's population was 553 in 115 households, when it was in Kashkan Rural District (Note: Renamed Kashkan-e Shomali Rural District) of the former Dowreh-ye Chegeni District in Khorramabad County. The following census in 2011 counted 737 people in 172 households, by which time the district had been separated from the county in the establishment of Dowreh County. (Note: Renamed Chegeni County) The rural district was transferred to the new Shahivand District and renamed Kashkan-e Shomali Rural District. The 2016 census measured the population of the village as 772 people in 222 households.
