= Gavgir-e Chamdaneh =

Village in Lorestan province, Iran

Gavgir-e Chamdaneh Persian: گاوگيرچمدانه
- Village
- Location within Iran
- Coordinates: 33°44′31″N 47°45′49″E
- Country: Iran
- Province: Lorestan
- County: Chegeni
- District: Shahivand
- Rural District: Kashkan-e Shomali

Population (2016)
  - Total: 497
- Time zone: UTC+3:30 (IRST)

Gavgir-e Chamdaneh (Persian: گاوگيرچمدانه) (Note: Also romanized as Gāvgīr-e Chamdāneh; also known as Gāvgīr-e Jahrāneh) is a village in Kashkan-e Shomali Rural District (Note: Formerly Kashkan Rural District) of Shahivand District in Chegeni County, (Note: Formerly Dowreh County) Lorestan province, Iran.

== Demographics ==
=== Population ===
At the time of the 2006 National Census, the village's population was 415 in 78 households, when it was in Kashkan Rural District (Note: Renamed Kashkan-e Shomali Rural District) of the former Dowreh-ye Chegeni District in Khorramabad County. The following census in 2011 counted 450 people in 111 households, by which time the district had been separated from the county in the establishment of Dowreh County. (Note: Renamed Chegeni County) The rural district was transferred to the new Shahivand District and renamed Kashkan-e Shomali Rural District. The 2016 census measured the population of the village as 497 people in 132 households.
