= Hudar =

Hudar (Persian: هودر) may refer to:

- Hudar, Lorestan
- Hudar, South Khorasan
- Hudar, Yazd
