= Zangi Bon =

Village in Lorestan province, Iran

Zangi Bon Persian: زنگي بان
- Village
- Location within Iran
- Country: Iran
- Province: Lorestan
- County: Chegeni
- District: Shahivand
- Rural District: Kashkan-e Shomali

Population (2016)
  - Total: 132
- Time zone: UTC+3:30 (IRST)

Zangi Bon (Persian: زنگي بان) (Note: Also romanized as Zangī Bon; also known as Shotor Mel (شترمل), Zangīn, and Zangīn Bon) is a village in Kashkan-e Shomali Rural District (Note: Formerly Kashkan Rural District) of Shahivand District in Chegeni County, (Note: Formerly Dowreh County) Lorestan province, Iran.

== Demographics ==
=== Population ===
At the time of the 2006 National Census, the village's population was 32 in seven households, when it was in Kashkan Rural District (Note: Renamed Kashkan-e Shomali Rural District) of the former Dowreh-ye Chegeni District in Khorramabad County. The following census in 2011 counted 121 people in 30 households, by which time the district had been separated from the county in the establishment of Dowreh County. (Note: Renamed Chegeni County) The rural district was transferred to the new Shahivand District and renamed Kashkan-e Shomali Rural District. The 2016 census measured the population of the village as 132 people in 35 households.
