= Rikhteh Kuh-e Varpol =

Village in Lorestan province, Iran

Rikhteh Kuh-e Varpol Persian: ريخته کوه ورپل
- Village
- Location within Iran
- Country: Iran
- Province: Lorestan
- County: Chegeni
- District: Shahivand
- Rural District: Kashkan-e Shomali

Population (2016)
  - Total: 118
- Time zone: UTC+3:30 (IRST)

Rikhteh Kuh-e Varpol (Persian: ريخته کوه ورپل) (Note: Also romanized as Rīkhteh Kūh-e Varpol; formerly known as Rikhteh Kuh (ريخته کوه), also romanized as Rīkhteh Kūh) is a village in Kashkan-e Shomali Rural District (Note: Formerly Kashkan Rural District) of Shahivand District in Chegeni County, (Note: Formerly Dowreh County) Lorestan province, Iran.

== Demographics ==
=== Population ===
At the time of the 2006 National Census, the village's population, as Rikhteh Kuh, was 110 in 19 households, when it was in Kashkan Rural District (Note: Renamed Kashkan-e Shomali Rural District) of the former Dowreh-ye Chegeni District in Khorramabad County. The following census in 2011 counted 112 people in 28 households, by which time the district had been separated from the county in the establishment of Dowreh County. (Note: Renamed Chegeni County) The rural district was transferred to the new Shahivand District and renamed Kashkan-e Shomali Rural District. The village was listed as Rikhteh Kuh-e Varpol. The 2016 census measured the population of the village as 118 people in 32 households.
