= Abbas Khan =

Abbas Khan may refer to:

- Abbas Khan, Lorestan, a village in Kashkan Rural District, Lorestan Province, Iran
- Abbas Khan (cricketer) (1911–2002), Indian cricketer
- Abbas Khan (squash player) (1954–2021), Pakistani squash player
- Abbas Khan (died 2013), British orthopaedic surgeon killed while imprisoned by the Syrian government; see Death of Abbas Khan
- Muhammad Abbas Khan, fictional character in the 2025 Indian film Haq, portrayed by Emraan Hashmi
