= Cham Khusheh-ye Shir Kesh =

Village in Lorestan province, Iran

Cham Khusheh-ye Shir Kesh Persian: چم خوشه شير کش
- Village
- Location within Iran
- Coordinates: 33°41′54″N 47°48′04″E
- Country: Iran
- Province: Lorestan
- County: Chegeni
- District: Shahivand
- Rural District: Kashkan-e Shomali

Population (2016)
  - Total: 785
- Time zone: UTC+3:30 (IRST)

Cham Khusheh-ye Shir Kesh (Persian: چم خوشه شير کش) (Note: Also romanized as Cham Khūsheh-ye Shīr Kesh; formerly known as Cham Khusheh (چم خوشه), also romanized as Cham Khūsheh) is a village in Kashkan-e Shomali Rural District (Note: Formerly Kashkan Rural District) of Shahivand District in Chegeni County, (Note: Formerly Dowreh County) Lorestan province, Iran.

== Demographics ==
=== Population ===
At the time of the 2006 National Census, the village's population, as Cham Khusheh, was 687 in 146 households, when it was in Kashkan Rural District (Note: Renamed Kashkan-e Shomali Rural District) of the former Dowreh-ye Chegeni District in Khorramabad County. The following census in 2011 counted 702 people in 168 households, by which time the district had been separated from the county in the establishment of Dowreh County. (Note: Renamed Chegeni County) The rural district was transferred to the new Shahivand District and renamed Kashkan-e Shomali Rural District. The village was listed as Cham Khusheh-ye Shir Kesh. The 2016 census measured the population of the village as 785 people in 256 households, the most populous in its rural district.
