= Taleqan-e Do =

Village in Lorestan province, Iran

Taleqan-e Do Persian: طالقان2
- Village
- Location within Iran
- Coordinates: 33°43′48″N 47°41′32″E
- Country: Iran
- Province: Lorestan
- County: Chegeni
- District: Shahivand
- Rural District: Kashkan-e Shomali

Population (2016)
  - Total: 165
- Time zone: UTC+3:30 (IRST)

Taleqan-e Do (Persian: طالقان2) (Note: Also romanized as Ţāleqān-e Do (طالقان دو); also known as Ţāleghānī-ye Do) is a village in Kashkan-e Shomali Rural District (Note: Formerly Kashkan Rural District) of Shahivand District in Chegeni County, (Note: Formerly Dowreh County) Lorestan province, Iran.

== Demographics ==
=== Population ===
At the time of the 2006 National Census, the village's population was 273 in 56 households, when it was in Kashkan Rural District (Note: Renamed Kashkan-e Shomali Rural District) of the former Dowreh-ye Chegeni District in Khorramabad County. The following census in 2011 counted 163 people in 36 households, by which time the district had been separated from the county in the establishment of Dowreh County. (Note: Renamed Chegeni County) The rural district was transferred to the new Shahivand District and renamed Kashkan-e Shomali Rural District. The 2016 census measured the population of the village as 165 people in 42 households.
