= Pir Samadin =

Village in Lorestan province, Iran

Pir Samadin Persian: پير صمدين
- Village
- Location within Iran
- Coordinates: 33°42′31″N 47°47′59″E
- Country: Iran
- Province: Lorestan
- County: Chegeni
- District: Shahivand
- Rural District: Kashkan-e Shomali

Population (2016)
  - Total: 196
- Time zone: UTC+3:30 (IRST)

Pir Samadin (Persian: پير صمدين) (Note: Also romanized as Pīr Şamadīn; also known as Pīr Şadīn and Pīr Seyyed Āḥmed (پير سيد احمد)) is a village in Kashkan-e Shomali Rural District (Note: Formerly Kashkan Rural District) of Shahivand District in Chegeni County, (Note: Formerly Dowreh County) Lorestan province, Iran.

== Demographics ==
=== Population ===
At the time of the 2006 National Census, the village's population was 199 in 40 households, when it was in Kashkan Rural District (Note: Renamed Kashkan-e Shomali Rural District) of the former Dowreh-ye Chegeni District in Khorramabad County. The following census in 2011 counted 193 people in 41 households, by which time the district had been separated from the county in the establishment of Dowreh County. (Note: Renamed Chegeni County) The rural district was transferred to the new Shahivand District and renamed Kashkan-e Shomali Rural District. The 2016 census measured the population of the village as 196 people in 49 households.
