= Guran-e Cham Shahivand =

Village in Lorestan province, Iran

Guran-e Cham Shahivand Persian: گوران چم شاهيوند
- Village
- Location within Iran
- Country: Iran
- Province: Lorestan
- County: Chegeni
- District: Shahivand
- Rural District: Kashkan-e Shomali

Population (2016)
  - Total: 34
- Time zone: UTC+3:30 (IRST)

Guran-e Cham Shahivand (Persian: گوران چم شاهيوند) (Note: Also romanized as Gūran-e Cham Shāhīvand; also known as Gurahan-e Cham Shahivand, Gūrāhan-e Cham Shāhīvand, and Gorūhān-e Cham) is a village in Kashkan-e Shomali Rural District (Note: Formerly Kashkan Rural District) of Shahivand District in Chegeni County, (Note: Formerly Dowreh County) Lorestan province, Iran.

== Demographics ==
=== Population ===
At the time of the 2006 National Census, the village's population was 35 in seven households, when it was in Kashkan Rural District (Note: Renamed Kashkan-e Shomali Rural District) of the former Dowreh-ye Chegeni District in Khorramabad County. The following census in 2011 counted 35 people in nine households, by which time the district had been separated from the county in the establishment of Dowreh County. (Note: Renamed Chegeni County) The rural district was transferred to the new Shahivand District and renamed Kashkan-e Shomali Rural District. The 2016 census measured the population of the village as 34 people in eight households.
