= Karamabad, Chegeni =

Village in Lorestan province, Iran

Karamabad Persian: کرم آباد
- Village
- Location within Iran
- Coordinates: 33°52′15″N 48°14′44″E
- Country: Iran
- Province: Lorestan
- County: Chegeni
- District: Shahivand
- Rural District: Kashkan-e Shomali

Population (2016)
  - Total: 120
- Time zone: UTC+3:30 (IRST)

Karamabad (Persian: کرم آباد) (Note: Also romanized as Karamābād; formerly known as Pirkeh-ye Sofla (پيرکه سفلي), also romanized as Pīrkeh-ye Soflá) is a village in Kashkan-e Shomali Rural District (Note: Formerly Kashkan Rural District) of Shahivand District in Chegeni County, (Note: Formerly Dowreh County) Lorestan province, Iran.

== Demographics ==
=== Population ===
At the time of the 2006 National Census, the village's population, as Pirkeh-ye Sofla, was 423 in 88 households, when it was in Kashkan Rural District (Note: Renamed Kashkan-e Shomali Rural District) of the former Dowreh-ye Chegeni District in Khorramabad County. The following census in 2011 counted 27 people in seven households, by which time the district had been separated from the county in the establishment of Dowreh County. (Note: Renamed Chegeni County) The rural district was transferred to the new Shahivand District and renamed Kashkan-e Shomali Rural District. The village was listed as Karamabad. The 2016 census measured the population of the village as 120 people in 27 households.
