= Cham Palak =

Village in Lorestan province, Iran

Cham Palak Persian: چم پلك
- Village
- Location within Iran
- Coordinates: 33°42′18″N 47°47′32″E
- Country: Iran
- Province: Lorestan
- County: Chegeni
- District: Shahivand
- Rural District: Kashkan-e Shomali

Population (2016)
  - Total: 707
- Time zone: UTC+3:30 (IRST)

Cham Palak (Persian: چم پلك) (Note: Also romanized as Cham Palk) is a village in Kashkan-e Shomali Rural District (Note: Formerly Kashkan Rural District) of Shahivand District in Chegeni County, (Note: Formerly Dowreh County) Lorestan province, Iran, serving as capital of both the district and the rural district.

== Demographics ==
=== Population ===
At the time of the 2006 National Census, the village's population was 575 in 117 households, when it was in Kashkan Rural District (Note: Renamed Kashkan-e Shomali Rural District) of the former Dowreh-ye Chegeni District in Khorramabad County. The following census in 2011 counted 698 people in 154 households, by which time the district had been separated from the county in the establishment of Dowreh County. (Note: Renamed Chegeni County) The rural district was transferred to the new Shahivand District and renamed Kashkan-e Shomali Rural District. The 2016 census measured the population of the village as 707 people in 186 households.
