= Garmurt-e Mirzakhani =

Village in Lorestan province, Iran

Garmurt-e Mirzakhani Persian: گرمورت ميرزاخاني
- Village
- Location within Iran
- Coordinates: 33°42′19″N 47°48′52″E
- Country: Iran
- Province: Lorestan
- County: Chegeni
- District: Shahivand
- Rural District: Kashkan-e Shomali

Population (2016)
  - Total: 460
- Time zone: UTC+3:30 (IRST)

Garmurt-e Mirzakhani (Persian: گرمورت ميرزاخاني) (Note: Also romanized as Garmūrt-e Mīrzākhānī; formerly known as Garmurt-e Ramazanabad (گرمورت رمضان آباد), also romanized as Garmūrt-e Ramaz̤ānābād; also known as Garmūrd, Garmūrt, Garmūrt-e Mīrzā Khān (گرمورت ميرزاخان), and Germūrth) is a village in Kashkan-e Shomali Rural District (Note: Formerly Kashkan Rural District) of Shahivand District in Chegeni County, (Note: Formerly Dowreh County) Lorestan province, Iran.

== Demographics ==
=== Population ===
At the time of the 2006 National Census, the village's population, as Garmurt-e Ramazanabad, was 420 in 92 households, when it was in Kashkan Rural District (Note: Renamed Kashkan-e Shomali Rural District) of the former Dowreh-ye Chegeni District in Khorramabad County. The following census in 2011 counted 418 people in 103 households, by which time the district had been separated from the county in the establishment of Dowreh County. (Note: Renamed Chegeni County) The rural district was transferred to the new Shahivand District and renamed Kashkan-e Shomali Rural District. The village was listed as Garmurt-e Mirzakhani. The 2016 census measured the population of the village as 460 people in 128 households.
