= Kashkan-e Shomali Rural District =

Rural district in Lorestan province, Iran

Kashkan-e Shomali Rural District Persian: دهستان کشکان شمالي
- Rural District
- Location within Iran
- Coordinates: 33°46′N 47°44′E
- Country: Iran
- Province: Lorestan
- County: Chegeni
- District: Shahivand
- Capital: Cham Palak

Population (2016)
  - Total: 8,472
- Time zone: UTC+3:30 (IRST)

Kashkan-e Shomali Rural District (Persian: دهستان کشکان شمالي) (Note: Formerly Kashkan Rural District (دهستان کشکان)) is in Shahivand District of Chegeni County, (Note: Formerly Dowreh County) Lorestan province, Iran. Its capital is the village of Cham Palak.

== Demographics ==
=== Population ===
At the time of the 2006 National Census, the rural district's population (as Kashkan Rural District in the former Dowreh-ye Chegeni District of Khorramabad County) was 10,294 in 2,125 households. There were 8,328 inhabitants in 1,914 households at the following census of 2011, by which time the district had been separated from the county in the establishment of Dowreh County. (Note: Renamed Chegeni County) The rural district was transferred to the new Shahivand District and renamed Kashkan-e Shomali Rural District. The 2016 census measured the population of the rural district as 8,472 in 2,283 households. The most populous of its 37 villages was Cham Khusheh, with 785 people.

=== Other villages in the rural district ===
- Abbas Khan
- Anarestan
- Balutban
- Chahar Ab
- Cham Khusheh-ye Shir Kesh
- Chenaran
- Darmareh
- Garmurt-e Mirzakhani
- Garmurt-e Nosrati
- Gavgir-e Chamdaneh
- Guran-e Cham Shahivand
- Haft Cheshmeh
- Hudar
- Karam
- Karamabad
- Kargaz
- Katal
- Khaneh Sorkh
- Malek Mirzacham Dashti
- Piri Reza
- Pir Samadin
- Rikhteh Kuh-e Varpol
- Sheykh Gol
- Shotor Mel
- Siah Cham
- Taleqan-e Do
- Taleqan-e Yek
- Tazehabad
- Valad Kosh
- Varpol
- Zangi Bon
- Zherizhban
