= Shotor Mel-e Olya-ye Rahmat =

Shotor Mel-e Olya-ye Rahmat شترمل علياي رحمت
- Village
- Location within Iran
- Coordinates: 33°41′08″N 48°10′52″E
- Country: Iran
- Province: Lorestan
- County: Selseleh
- Bakhsh: Central
- Rural District: Honam

Population (2006)
  - Total: 165
- Time zone: UTC+3:30 (IRST)
  - Summer (DST): UTC+4:30 (IRDT)

Shotor Mel-e Olya-ye Rahmat (Persian: شترمل علياي رحمت, also Romanized as Shotor Mel-e ‘Olyā-ye Raḩmat and Shotormal-e ‘Olyā-ye Raḩmat; also called Shotor Mel-e Bālā, Shotor Mol, Shotor Mel, and Shotormāl-e ‘Olyā-ye Hemmat) is a village in Honam Rural District, in the Central District of Selseleh County, Lorestan Province, Iran. At the 2006 census, its population was 165, in 39 families.
