= Pirkeh-ye Olya =

Pirkeh-ye Olya پيركه عليا
- Village
- Location within Iran
- Coordinates: 33°52′15″N 48°14′44″E
- Country: Iran
- Province: Lorestan
- County: Selseleh
- Bakhsh: Central
- Rural District: Qaleh-ye Mozaffari

Population (2006)
  - Total: 97
- Time zone: UTC+3:30 (IRST)
  - Summer (DST): UTC+4:30 (IRDT)

Pirkeh-ye Olya (Persian: پيركه عليا, also Romanized as Pīrkeh-ye ‘Olyā and Pīrgeh-ye ‘Olyā) is a village in Qaleh-ye Mozaffari Rural District, in the Central District of Selseleh County, Lorestan Province, Iran. At the 2006 census, its population was 97, in 22 families.
