= Shahivand District =

District in Lorestan province, Iran

Shahivand District Persian: بخش شاهیوند
- District
- Location within Iran
- Coordinates: 33°41′N 47°47′E
- Country: Iran
- Province: Lorestan
- County: Chegeni
- Established: 2007
- Capital: Cham Palak

Population (2016)
  - Total: 14,851
- Time zone: UTC+3:30 (IRST)

Shahivand District (Persian: بخش شاهیوند) is in Chegeni County, (Note: Formerly Dowreh County) Lorestan province, Iran. Its capital is the village of Cham Palak.

The district is entirely rural. In the district is the Kashkan River. Most of the people work in fields and cultivate grain. Some families depend on their livestock and earn money from the sale of their animals’ by-products. These animals are chickens, goats, sheep, and cows.

== History ==
In 2007, Dowreh-ye Chegeni and Veysian Districts were separated from Khorramabad County in the establishment of Dowreh County, (Note: Renamed Chegeni County) which was divided into three districts of two rural districts each, with Sarab-e Dowreh as its capital. The county was renamed Chegeni County in 2019.

== Demographics ==
=== Population ===
At the time of the 2011 National Census, the district's population was 14,824 in 3,509 households. The 2016 census measured the population of the district as 14,851 inhabitants in 4,079 households.

=== Administrative divisions ===
Shahivand District Population
| Administrative Divisions | 2011 | 2016 |
|---|---|---|
| Kashkan-e Jonubi RD | 6,496 | 6,379 |
| Kashkan-e Shomali RD (Note: Formerly Kashkan Rural District) | 8,328 | 8,472 |
| Total | 14,824 | 14,851 |
RD = Rural District
