= Maidan =

Maidan is an originally Persian word for a town square or public gathering place (Persian: میدان), adopted by various other languages: Urdu میدان (maidān); Arabic مَيْدَان (maydān); Turkish meydan; Georgian მოედანი (moedani); Bangla ময়দান, meaning field, and Crimean Tatar, from which Ukrainian also borrowed maidan. Its ultimate source is Proto-Indo-European *médʰyos – compare Avestan maiδya, Sanskrit मध्य (madhya) and Latin medius. Various versions include maydan, midan, meydan, majdan, mayadeen and maydān. It also means field (मैदान) in Hindi. It became a loanword in other South Asian languages to give similar means, such as in Tamil in which the word is maidhanam.

The broad geographical footprint of the use of Maidan in toponymy, from Central Europe to South-East Asia, is a reflection of the Turkish rule in these areas.

== Places ==
=== In Eastern West Asia, and Southern Central Asia ===
- Maidaan-e naqsh-e jahaan or Naqsh-e Jahan Square, a historic square in central Isfahan, Iran

Towns and villages in Iran:

- Meydan, Fars, Fars Province
- Meydan, Ilam, Ilam Province
- Meydan, Baft, Kerman Province
- Meydan, Rabor, Kerman Province
- Meydan, Harsin, Kermanshah Province
- Meydan, Kermanshah, Kermanshah Province
- Meydan, Sonqor, Kermanshah Province
- Meydan, Khuzestan, Khuzestan Province
- Meydan, Dorud, Khuzestan Province
- Meydan, Kohgiluyeh and Boyer-Ahmad
- Meydan-e Mozaffarkhan, Kurdistan
- Meydan, West Azerbaijan
- Meydan-e Olya, West Azerbaijan Province
- Meydan-e Sofla, West Azerbaijan Province
- Meydan Khalaf
- Meydan Tarreh Barahvaz
- Meydan Jiq, Malekan
- Meydan-e Bozorg, Lorestan Province
- Meydanlar, East Azerbaijan Province
- Meydan-e Khodaverdi
- Meydan-e Tafalli
- Ban Meydan-e Abdollah
- Chal Meydan
- Eslamabad-e Sar Meydan
- Kalateh-ye Meydan
- Qaleh Meydan (disambiguation), various places
- Qezelejah Meydan
- Sang Dar Meydan (disambiguation), various places
- Sarmeydan
- Soltan Meydan
- Tak Meydan
- Meydan, Afghanistan, village in Balkh Province in northern Afghanistan
- Maydan, Kyrgyzstan, a town in Kyrgyzstan
- Maidan Shar, the capital of Maidan Wardak province, north-eastern Afghanistan
- Mehraneh river (Meydan Chayi), a river in north-western Tabriz, Iran
- Tavisuplebis Moedani or Freedom Square, Tbilisi, the central square of Tbilisi, Georgia

=== In South Asia and Southeast Asia ===
- Maidan (Tirah), a remote valley in Khyber District, Khyber Pakhtunkhwa, Pakistan
- Maidan, Nepal, a municipality in southern Nepal
- Maidan, Lower Dir District, a valley in Lower Dir District, Khyber Pakhtunkhwa, Pakistan
- Asramam Maidan, the first airport of Kerala state, in Kollam, India
- Medan, Indonesia – capital city of North Sumatra province
- Lal Bahadur Shastri Stadium, Hyderabad, India, originally named Fateh Maidan ("Victory Square")
- Maidan (Kolkata), India, also referred to as the Brigade Parade Ground

=== In the rest of West Asia ===
- Meydan, Gölbaşı, a village in the district of Gölbaşı, Adıyaman Province, Turkey
- Meydan, Kurucaşile, a village in the district of Kurucaşile, Bartın Province, Turkey
- Sultanahmet Square (Sultanahmet Meydanı), formerly Atmeydanı ("Horse Square"), in the center of Istanbul, Turkey
  - Taksim Meydanı or Taksim Square, another central public square in Istanbul, Turkey
- Midan at-Tahrir or Tahrir Square, the central public space of Cairo, Egypt
  - The esplanade formerly known as Maydan or Hippodrome outside the Cairo Citadel
- Majdan (Novi Kneževac), a village in North Banat District, Vojvodina province, Serbia
- Meidan Ekbis, a small town in Syria
- Al-Midan, neighbourhood and municipality in Damascus, Syria
- Maydan al Shajara, a town square in Benghazi, Libya
- Tašmajdan Park, a major public space in Belgrade, Serbia
- Dubai Meydan City, United Arab Emirates
  - Meydan Racecourse, a horse racetrack
  - Entisar Tower (Meydan Tower), skyscraper to be built in the city
- Maidan, the Romanian name for Majdanpek in Serbia
- Mïdän at Taḥrǐr or Tahrir Square, Alexandria, Egypt
- Tahrir Square, Sanaa, or Maidan at-Tahrir, in Sanaa, Yemen
- Al-Maidan Square, Baghdad, Iraq
  - Al-Maidan Mosque, the main mosque located in the square

=== In Poland ===
Poland took up the word majdan from its numerous exchanges with the Ottoman and other Persianate-influenced cultures.

- Majdan, Gmina Wojsławice in Lublin Voivodeship
- Majdan, Gmina Żmudź in Lublin Voivodeship
- Majdan, Hrubieszów County in Lublin Voivodeship
- Majdan, Janów County in Lublin Voivodeship
- Majdan, Białystok County in Podlaskie Voivodeship
- Majdan, Hajnówka County in Podlaskie Voivodeship
- Majdan, Suwałki County in Podlaskie Voivodeship
- Majdan, Gmina Telatyn, Tomaszów County in Lublin Voivodeship
- Majdan, Lesko County in Subcarpathian Voivodeship
- Majdan, Garwolin County in Masovian Voivodeship
- Majdan, Mińsk County in Masovian Voivodeship
- Majdan, Ostrołęka County in Masovian Voivodeship
- Majdan, Otwock County in Masovian Voivodeship
- Majdan, Gmina Łochów in Masovian Voivodeship
- Majdan, Gmina Stoczek in Masovian Voivodeship
- Majdan, Gmina Wierzbno in Masovian Voivodeship
- Majdan, Wołomin County in Masovian Voivodeship
- Majdan, Warmian-Masurian Voivodeship

=== In Romania ===
- Maidan, a village in Cacica Commune, Suceava County
- Maidan, the former name of Brădișoru de Jos village, Oravița Town, Caraș-Severin County

=== In Ukraine ===
- Maidan Nezalezhnosti (Майдан Незалежності) or Independence Square, the central square of Kyiv
  - Maidan Nezalezhnosti, a metro station on line M2
- Maidan Konstytutsii (Kharkiv Metro), or Constitution Square, a metro station in Kharkiv
- Maidan Pratsi (Kryvyi Rih Metrotram)
- Staryi Maidan, village in Khmelnytskyi Raion, Khmelnytskyi Oblast
- Viche Maidan (Ivano-Frankivsk), a city square
- Maidan, a village in Berehomet rural hromada, Vyzhnytsia Raion, Chernivtsi Oblast
- Maidan, a village in Vyzhnytsia urban hromada, Vyzhnytsia Raion, Chernivtsi Oblast
- Maidan, a village in Cherkaske settlement hromada, Kramatorsk Raion, Donetsk Oblast
- Maidan, a village in Tysmenytsia Raion, Ivano-Frankivsk Oblast

== Other uses in Ukraine ==
- Maidan (2014 film)
- Maidan People's Union, political party
- Euromaidan
  - Anti-Maidan
  - Anti-Maidan (Russia)
  - AutoMaidan
- February 2014 Maidan revolution

== See also ==
- Majdany, the plural form of Majdan.
