= Kaleh Jub =

Kaleh Jub or Kalleh Jub or Koleh Jub or Kolahjub or Kolehjub or Kolah Jub or Kalah Jub (Persian: كله جوب) may refer to:

== Ilam Province ==
- Kolahjub, Ilam
- Kaleh Jub, Eyvan, Ilam Province
- Kolahjub, Shirvan and Chardaval, Ilam Province

== Kermanshah Province ==
- Koleh Jub, Eslamabad-e Gharb, a village in Eslamabd-e Gharb County
- Kolah Jub-e Esfandiari, a village in Gilan-e Gharb County
- Kolah Jub-e Karmi, a village in Gilan-e Gharb County
- Kolah Jub-e Olya-ye Do, a village in Gilan-e Gharb County
- Kolah Jub-e Olya-ye Yek, a village in Gilan-e Gharb County
- Kolah Jub-e Sofla, Kermanshah, a village in Gilan-e Gharb County
- Kalleh Jub, Kermanshah, a village in Kermanshah County
- Kalleh Jub, Qasr-e Shirin, a village in Qasr-e Shirin County
- Kolehjub-e Dartang, a village in Sahneh County
- Kolah Jub-e Olya, Kermanshah, a village in Sahneh County

== Lorestan Province ==
- Kaleh Jub, Delfan, a village in Delfan County
- Kalleh Jub-e Hajj Ali, a village in Khorramabad County
- Kalleh Jub, Zagheh, a village in Khorramabad County
- Koleh Jub-e Sofla, Lorestan, a village in Khorramabad County

== Markazi Province ==
- Koleh Jub, Markazi
