= Cheshmeh Pahn =

Cheshmeh Pahn or Cheshmeh-ye Pahn or Chashmeh Pahn (Persian: چشمه پهن) may refer to:

- Cheshmeh Pahn, Hamadan
- Cheshmeh Pahn-e Nanaj, Hamadan Province
- Cheshmeh Pahn, Malekshahi, Ilam Province
- Cheshmeh Pahn, Shirvan and Chardaval, Ilam Province
- Cheshmeh Pahn-e Alishah, Kermanshah Province
- Cheshmeh Pahn-e Fereydun, Kermanshah Province
- Cheshmeh Pahn-e Rashid, Kermanshah Province
- Cheshmeh Pahn-e Dasht Rum, Kohgiluyeh and Boyer-Ahmad Province
- Cheshmeh Pahn Ganjegan, Kohgiluyeh and Boyer-Ahmad Province
- Cheshmeh Pahn, Markazi
