= Taiyafeh =

Taiyafeh (Persian: طايفه) may refer to:

- Taiyafeh-ye Ali Jan
- Taiyafeh-ye Babakhan
- Taiyafeh-ye Hazrat-e Soleyman
- Taiyafeh-ye Seyfollah
- Taiyafeh-ye Shaeran
- Taiyafeh-ye Shirzadi
