= Darabi =

Darabi (Persian: دارابى) and (Kurdish: دارابى) may refer to the Kurdish Darabi Clan from Kermanshah, Kurdistan with the same family name. The Darabi Clan was formed by Dara, ancestor of today's Darabi Kurds. There are no exact numbers of Darabi Clan members, but estimation says more than 10 000 members belonging to the Darabi Clan spread around the world. Darabi is also a commonly used family name among Persians and Iranians.

== Places ==
- Darabi, Dalahu, Kermanshah Province
- Darabi, Gilan-e Gharb, Kermanshah Province
- Darabi, alternate name of Galuzi-ye Davud, Gilan-e Gharb County, Kermanshah Province
- Darabi, Kurdistan
- Darabi, Lorestan

== Other uses ==
- Darabi (surname)

== See also ==
- Darab (disambiguation)
