= Darab (disambiguation) =

Darab is a city in Fars Province, Iran.

Darab or Dar-e Ab (Persian: داراب or دراب) may also refer to various places in Iran:

- Darab, East Azerbaijan
- Darab, Ilam
- Darab, Zarand, Kerman Province (داراب - Dārāb)
- Darab, Kermanshah (دراب - Darāb)
- Darab, Dalahu, Kermanshah Province
- Darab, Razavi Khorasan
- Darab, West Azerbaijan
- Darab County, in Fars Province

== See also ==
- Darabi (disambiguation)
