= Behabad (disambiguation) =

Behabad is a city in Yazd Province, Iran.

Behabad or Bahabad (Persian: بهاباد) may also refer to various places in Iran:

- Bahabad, Kerman
- Behabad-e Qobasiah, Kermanshah Province
- Behabad-e Saleh, Kermanshah Province
- Behabad, Chenaran, Razavi Khorasan Province
- Behabad, Gonabad, Razavi Khorasan Province
- Behabad, South Khorasan
- Behabad County, in Yazd Province
