= Kolah Deraz =

Kolah Deraz (Persian: كلاه دراز) may refer to:

- Kolah Deraz-e Olya
- Kolah Deraz-e Sofla
- Kolah Deraz-e Vosta
