= Varegah =

Varegah (Persian: وارگه) may refer to:

- Varegah, Ilam
- Varegah, Kermanshah
- Varegah-e Olya, Kermanshah Province
- Varegah-e Sofla, Kermanshah Province
