= Kolah Jub-e Olya =

Kolah Jub-e Olya or Kaleh Jub-e Olya (Persian: كله جوب عليا) may refer to:

- Kaleh Jub-e Olya, Eslamabad-e Gharb
- Kolah Jub-e Olya 1
- Kolah Jub-e Olya 2
