= Heydariyeh (disambiguation) =

Heydariyeh is a village in South Khorasan Province, Iran

Heydariyeh (Persian: حيدريه) may also refer to:

- Heydariyeh Bozorg
- Heydariyeh Kuchak
- Heydariyeh Rural District
