= Geravian-e Sofla =

Geravian-e Sofla گراويان سفلي
- Village
- Location within Iran
- Coordinates: 34°09′21″N 45°53′37″E
- Country: Iran
- Province: Kermanshah
- County: Gilan-e Gharb
- Bakhsh: Central
- Rural District: Howmeh

Population (2006)
  - Total: 320
- Time zone: UTC+3:30 (IRST)
  - Summer (DST): UTC+4:30 (IRDT)

Geravian-e Sofla (Persian: گراويان سفلي, also Romanized as Gerāvīān-e Soflá and Gerāveyān-e Soflá; also known as Gerāvīān-e Pā’īn) is a village in Howmeh Rural District, in the Central District of Gilan-e Gharb County, Kermanshah Province, Iran. At the 2006 census, its population was 320, in 73 families.
