= Kulsavand =

Kulsavand كولسوند
- Village
- Location within Iran
- Coordinates: 34°01′57″N 46°08′58″E
- Country: Iran
- Province: Kermanshah
- County: Gilan-e Gharb
- Bakhsh: Central
- Rural District: Cheleh

Population (2006)
  - Total: 159
- Time zone: UTC+3:30 (IRST)
  - Summer (DST): UTC+4:30 (IRDT)

Kulsavand (Persian: كولسوند, also Romanized as Kūlsavand) is a village in Cheleh Rural District, in the Central District of Gilan-e Gharb County, Kermanshah Province, Iran. At the 2006 census, its population was 159, in 35 families.
