= Shanqal-e Khaldi =

Shanqal-e Khaldi شنقال خالدي
- Village
- Country: Iran
- Province: Kermanshah
- County: Gilan-e Gharb
- Bakhsh: Central
- Rural District: Direh

Population (2006)
  - Total: 283
- Time zone: UTC+3:30 (IRST)
  - Summer (DST): UTC+4:30 (IRDT)

Shanqal-e Khaldi (Persian: شنقال خالدي, also Romanized as Shanqāl-e Khāldī) is a village in Direh Rural District, in the Central District of Gilan-e Gharb County, Kermanshah Province, Iran. At the 2006 census, its population was 283, in 50 families.
