= Bineh Gerd =

Bineh Gerd بينه گرد
- Village
- Location within Iran
- Coordinates: 34°09′29″N 45°54′41″E
- Country: Iran
- Province: Kermanshah
- County: Gilan-e Gharb
- Bakhsh: Central
- Rural District: Howmeh

Population (2006)
  - Total: 226
- Time zone: UTC+3:30 (IRST)
  - Summer (DST): UTC+4:30 (IRDT)

Bineh Gerd (Persian: بينه گرد, also Romanized as Bīneh Gerd; also known as Bīn-e Gerd and Bīnegerd) is a village in Howmeh Rural District, in the Central District of Gilan-e Gharb County, Kermanshah Province, Iran. At the 2006 census, its population was 226, in 56 families.
