= Biabad =

Biabad (Persian: بي اباد) may refer to:

- Biabad-e Qoba Siah
- Biabad-e Saleh
