= Jub Baghan =

Jub Baghan (Persian: جوبباغان) may refer to:

- Jub Baghan-e Olya
- Jub Baghan-e Sofla
- Shahrak-e Jub Baghan
