= Mohammad Reza Keyani =

Mohammad Reza Keyani محمدرضاكياني
- Village
- Country: Iran
- Province: Kermanshah
- County: Gilan-e Gharb
- Bakhsh: Central
- Rural District: Howmeh

Population (2006)
  - Total: 87
- Time zone: UTC+3:30 (IRST)
  - Summer (DST): UTC+4:30 (IRDT)

Mohammad Reza Keyani (Persian: محمدرضاكياني, also Romanized as Moḩammad Rez̤ā Keyānī) is a village in Howmeh Rural District, in the Central District of Gilan-e Gharb County, Kermanshah Province, Iran. At the 2006 census, its population was 87, in 18 families.
