= Mir Mirab =

Mir Mirab (Persian: ميرميراب), also known as Mileh Mirab may refer to:

- Mir Mirab-e Olya
- Mir Mirab-e Sofla
