= Ruiban =

Ruiban (Persian: رويبان), also rendered as Rubian, may refer to:

- Ruiban-e Bozorg
- Ruiban-e Kuchak
