= Nesar Direh-ye Sofla =

Village in Kermanshah, Iran

Nesar Direh-ye Sofla نسارديره سفلي
- Village
- Country: Iran
- Province: Kermanshah
- County: Gilan-e Gharb
- Bakhsh: Central
- Rural District: Direh

Population (2006)
  - Total: 43
- Time zone: UTC+3:30 (IRST)
  - Summer (DST): UTC+4:30 (IRDT)

Nesar Direh-ye Sofla (Persian: نسارديره سفلي, also Romanized as Nesār Dīreh-ye Soflá) is a village in Direh Rural District, in the Central District of Gilan-e Gharb County, Kermanshah Province, Iran. At the 2006 census, its population was 43, in 9 families.
