= Qashqeh =

Qashqeh قشقه
- Village
- Location within Iran
- Coordinates: 34°00′12″N 45°57′08″E
- Country: Iran
- Province: Kermanshah
- County: Gilan-e Gharb
- Bakhsh: Central
- Rural District: Vizhenan

Population (2006)
  - Total: 188
- Time zone: UTC+3:30 (IRST)
  - Summer (DST): UTC+4:30 (IRDT)

Qashqeh (Persian: قشقه; also known as Ghashqeh) is a village in Vizhenan Rural District, in the Central District of Gilan-e Gharb County, Kermanshah Province, Iran. At the 2006 census, its population was 188, in 38 families.
