= Sang-e Karmu Shirzadi =

Sang-e Karmu Shirzadi سنگ‌کرمو شیرزادی
- Village
- Location within Iran
- Coordinates: 34°06′31″N 45°56′04″E
- Country: Iran
- Province: Kermanshah
- County: Gilan-e Gharb
- Bakhsh: Central
- Rural District: Cheleh

Population (2006)
  - Total: 276
- Time zone: UTC+3:30 (IRST)
  - Summer (DST): UTC+4:30 (IRDT)

Sang-e Karmu Shirzadi (Persian: سنگ‌رمو شیرزادی, also Romanized as Sāng-e Karmū Shīrzādī) is a village in Cheleh Rural District, in the Central District of Gilan-e Gharb County, Kermanshah Province, Iran. At the 2006 census, its population was 276, in 59 families.
