= Gavmish Cheran-e Arab =

Gavmish Cheran-e Arab گاوميش چران عرب
- Village
- Location within Iran
- Coordinates: 34°16′21″N 45°48′01″E
- Country: Iran
- Province: Kermanshah
- County: Gilan-e Gharb
- Bakhsh: Central
- Rural District: Howmeh

Population (2006)
  - Total: 177
- Time zone: UTC+3:30 (IRST)
  - Summer (DST): UTC+4:30 (IRDT)

Gavmish Cheran-e Arab (Persian: گاوميش چران عرب, also Romanized as Gāvmīsh Cherān-e ‘Arab; also known as Gāvmīsh Cherān, Sheykh Dāvod ‘Arab, and Sheykh Dāvūd-e ‘Arab) is a village in Howmeh Rural District, in the Central District of Gilan-e Gharb County, Kermanshah Province, Iran. At the 2006 census, its population was 177, in 38 families.
