= Afsharabad =

Afsharabad افشاراباد
- Village
- Location within Iran
- Coordinates: 34°24′55″N 45°49′23″E
- Country: Iran
- Province: Kermanshah
- County: Gilan-e Gharb
- Bakhsh: Central
- Rural District: Direh

Population (2006)
  - Total: 72
- Time zone: UTC+3:30 (IRST)
  - Summer (DST): UTC+4:30 (IRDT)

Afsharabad (Persian: افشاراباد, also Romanized as Afshārābād) is a village in Direh Rural District, in the Central District of Gilan-e Gharb County, Kermanshah Province, Iran. At the 2006 census, its population was 72, in 16 families.
