= Gorazan-e Sofla =

Gorazan-e Sofla گرازان سفلي
- Village
- Location within Iran
- Coordinates: 34°10′15″N 45°54′17″E
- Country: Iran
- Province: Kermanshah
- County: Gilan-e Gharb
- Bakhsh: Central
- Rural District: Howmeh

Population (2006)
  - Total: 189
- Time zone: UTC+3:30 (IRST)
  - Summer (DST): UTC+4:30 (IRDT)

Gorazan-e Sofla (Persian: گرازان سفلي, also Romanized as Gorāzān-e Soflá; also known as Gorāzān-e Pā’īn) is a village in Howmeh Rural District, in the Central District of Gilan-e Gharb County, Kermanshah Province, Iran. At the 2006 census, its population was 189, in 35 families.
