= Avzin-e Fereydun =

Avzin-e Fereydun اوزين فريدون
- Village
- Location within Iran
- Coordinates: 34°12′03″N 45°49′40″E
- Country: Iran
- Province: Kermanshah
- County: Gilan-e Gharb
- Bakhsh: Central
- Rural District: Howmeh

Population (2006)
  - Total: 89
- Time zone: UTC+3:30 (IRST)
  - Summer (DST): UTC+4:30 (IRDT)

Avzin-e Fereydun (Persian: اوزين فريدون, also Romanized as Āvzīn-e Fereydūn; also known as Āvzīn and Owzīn) is a village in Howmeh Rural District, in the Central District of Gilan-e Gharb County, Kermanshah Province, Iran. At the 2006 census, its population was 89, in 21 families.
