= Sangchin-e Saleh =

Sangchin-e Saleh سنگچين صالح
- Village
- Location within Iran
- Coordinates: 33°58′34″N 46°14′15″E
- Country: Iran
- Province: Kermanshah
- County: Gilan-e Gharb
- Bakhsh: Central
- Rural District: Cheleh

Population (2006)
  - Total: 222
- Time zone: UTC+3:30 (IRST)
  - Summer (DST): UTC+4:30 (IRDT)

Sangchin-e Saleh (Persian: سنگچين صالح, also Romanized as Sangchīn-e Şāleḩ and Sang Chīn Şāleḩ) is a village in Cheleh Rural District, in the Central District of Gilan-e Gharb County, Kermanshah Province, Iran. At the 2006 census, its population was 222, in 49 families.
