= Cheshmeh Nezami =

Cheshmeh Nezami چشمه نظامی
- Village
- Location within Iran
- Coordinates: 33°59′52″N 46°12′22″E
- Country: Iran
- Province: Kermanshah
- County: Gilan-e Gharb
- Bakhsh: Central
- Rural District: Cheleh

Population (2006)
  - Total: 211
- Time zone: UTC+3:30 (IRST)
  - Summer (DST): UTC+4:30 (IRDT)

Cheshmeh Nezami (Persian: چشمه نظامی, also Romanized as Cheshmeh Nez̧āmī; also known as Zargūsh-e Cheshmeh Nez̧āmī) is a village in Cheleh Rural District, in the Central District of Gilan-e Gharb County, Kermanshah Province, Iran. At the 2006 census, its population was 211, in 42 families.
