= Gol Kheyrak =

Gol Kheyrak (Persian: گل خيرك) may refer to:

- Gol Kheyrak-e Olya
- Gol Kheyrak-e Sofla
