= Gorazan-e Olya =

Gorazan-eOlya گرازان عليا
- Village
- Location within Iran
- Coordinates: 34°09′46″N 45°54′17″E
- Country: Iran
- Province: Kermanshah
- County: Gilan-e Gharb
- Bakhsh: Central
- Rural District: Howmeh

Population (2006)
  - Total: 212
- Time zone: UTC+3:30 (IRST)
  - Summer (DST): UTC+4:30 (IRDT)

Gorazan-eOlya (Persian: گرازان عليا, also Romanized as Gorāzān-e‘Olyā) is a village in Howmeh Rural District, in the Central District of Gilan-e Gharb County, Kermanshah Province, Iran. As of the 2006 census, its population was 212, in 49 families.
