= Muderaz Hoseyn =

Muderaz Hoseyn مودرازحسين
- Village
- Location within Iran
- Coordinates: 34°15′00″N 45°49′00″E
- Country: Iran
- Province: Kermanshah
- County: Gilan-e Gharb
- Bakhsh: Central
- Rural District: Howmeh

Population (2006)
  - Total: 39
- Time zone: UTC+3:30 (IRST)
  - Summer (DST): UTC+4:30 (IRDT)

Muderaz Hoseyn (Persian: مودرازحسين, also Romanized as Mūderāz Ḩoseyn; also known as Mūderāz) is a village in Howmeh Rural District, in the Central District of Gilan-e Gharb County, Kermanshah Province, Iran. At the 2006 census, its population was 39, in 7 families.
