= Cham Surak =

Cham Surak (Persian: چم سورك), also rendered as Cham Surag, may refer to:

- Cham Surak-e Sofla
- Cham Surak-e Vosta
