= Cheshmeh Murineh =

Cheshmeh Murineh (Persian: چشمه مورينه) may refer to:

- Cheshmeh Murineh, Kermanshah
- Cheshmeh Murineh, Lorestan
