= Sheykh Sorkh ol Din =

Sheykh Sorkh ol Din or Sheykh Sorkh od Din (Persian: شيخ سرخ الدين) may refer to:

- Sheykh Sorkh ol Din-e Olya
- Sheykh Sorkh ol Din-e Sofla
