= Poshteh-ye Samavat =

Village in Kermanshah, Iran

Poshteh-ye Samavat پشته سماوات
- Village
- Location within Iran
- Coordinates: 34°02′18″N 46°08′52″E
- Country: Iran
- Province: Kermanshah
- County: Gilan-e Gharb
- Bakhsh: Central
- Rural District: Cheleh

Population (2006)
  - Total: 106
- Time zone: UTC+3:30 (IRST)
  - Summer (DST): UTC+4:30 (IRDT)

Poshteh-ye Samavat (Persian: پشته سماوات, also Romanized as Poshteh-ye Samāvāt; also known as Cheshmeh Samāvāt, Mashhadī Qāsem-e Samāvāt, and Posht Samāvāt) is a village in Cheleh Rural District, in the Central District of Gilan-e Gharb County, Kermanshah Province, Iran. At the 2006 census, its population was 106, in 22 families.
