= Bavon Makr =

Bavon Makr باونمكر
- Village
- Location within Iran
- Coordinates: 33°59′56″N 45°57′01″E
- Country: Iran
- Province: Kermanshah
- County: Gilan-e Gharb
- Bakhsh: Central
- Rural District: Vizhenan

Population (2006)
  - Total: 132
- Time zone: UTC+3:30 (IRST)
  - Summer (DST): UTC+4:30 (IRDT)

Bavon Makr (Persian: باونمكر, also Romanized as Bāvon Makr; also known as Pāvan Makr) is a village in Vizhenan Rural District, in the Central District of Gilan-e Gharb County, Kermanshah Province, Iran. At the 2006 census, its population was 132, in 26 families.
