= Qorutak =

Qorutak قروتك
- Village
- Location within Iran
- Coordinates: 34°01′26″N 46°01′25″E
- Country: Iran
- Province: Kermanshah
- County: Gilan-e Gharb
- Bakhsh: Central
- Rural District: Vizhenan

Population (2006)
  - Total: 69
- Time zone: UTC+3:30 (IRST)
  - Summer (DST): UTC+4:30 (IRDT)

Qorutak (Persian: قروتك, also Romanized as Qorūtak; also known as Gūrūtag, Mīāndār-e Qortak, and Mīāndār-e Qūrtak) is a village in Vizhenan Rural District, in the Central District of Gilan-e Gharb County, Kermanshah Province, Iran. At the 2006 census, its population was 69, in 17 families.
