= Sarhal-e Shirzadi =

Sarhal-e Shirzadi سرحال شيرزادي
- Village
- Location within Iran
- Coordinates: 34°03′41″N 45°54′32″E
- Country: Iran
- Province: Kermanshah
- County: Gilan-e Gharb
- Bakhsh: Central
- Rural District: Vizhenan

Population (2006)
  - Total: 263
- Time zone: UTC+3:30 (IRST)
  - Summer (DST): UTC+4:30 (IRDT)

Sarhal-e Shirzadi (Persian: سرحال شيرزادي, also Romanized as Sarḩāl-e Shīrāzī) is a village in Vizhenan Rural District, in the Central District of Gilan-e Gharb County, Kermanshah Province, Iran. At the 2006 census, its population was 263, in 55 families.
