= Mirabeh =

Mirabeh ميرابه
- Village
- Location within Iran
- Coordinates: 34°12′14″N 45°52′17″E
- Country: Iran
- Province: Kermanshah
- County: Gilan-e Gharb
- Bakhsh: Central
- Rural District: Howmeh

Population (2006)
  - Total: 386
- Time zone: UTC+3:30 (IRST)
  - Summer (DST): UTC+4:30 (IRDT)

Mirabeh (Persian: ميرابه, also Romanized as Mīrābeh; also known as Garegeh, Gargahī, Gargeh’ī, and Gorkehī) is a village in Howmeh Rural District, in the Central District of Gilan-e Gharb County, Kermanshah Province, Iran. At the 2006 census, its population was 386, in 79 families.
