= Ali Khanabad =

Coordinates: 34°16′54″N 45°48′19″E

Ali Khanabad علي خان اباد
- Village
- Interactive map of Ali Khanabad
- Country: Iran
- Province: Kermanshah
- County: Gilan-e Gharb
- Bakhsh: Central
- Rural District: Howmeh

Population (2006)
  - Total: 244
- Time zone: UTC+3:30 (IRST)
  - Summer (DST): UTC+4:30 (IRDT)

Ali Khanabad (Persian: علي خان اباد, also Romanized as ʿAlī Khānābād) is a village in Howmeh Rural District, in the Central District of Gilan-e Gharb County, Kermanshah Province, Iran. At the 2006 census, its population was 244, in 54 families.
