= Abd ol Aziz =

Abd ol Aziz (Persian: عبدالعزيز) may refer to:

- Abd ol Aziz, Kermanshah
- Abd ol Aziz, Khash, Sistan and Baluchestan Province
