= Shisheh Rah =

Shisheh Rah شيشه راه
- Village
- Location within Iran
- Coordinates: 34°22′32″N 45°50′37″E
- Country: Iran
- Province: Kermanshah
- County: Gilan-e Gharb
- Bakhsh: Central
- Rural District: Direh

Population (2006)
  - Total: 144
- Time zone: UTC+3:30 (IRST)
  - Summer (DST): UTC+4:30 (IRDT)

Shisheh Rah (Persian: شيشه راه, also Romanized as Shīsheh Rāh; also known as Shesh Rāh) is a village in Direh Rural District, in the Central District of Gilan-e Gharb County, Kermanshah Province, Iran. At the 2006 census, its population was 144, in 25 families.
