= Sarcheleh Varegah =

Sarcheleh Varegah (Persian: سرچله وارگه), also simply Sar Cheleh or Sarcheleh or Sar Chelleh, may refer to:

- Sarcheleh Varegah-e Olya
- Sarcheleh Varegah-e Sofla
