= Anjavarud =

Anjavarud انجاورود
- Village
- Location within Iran
- Coordinates: 34°15′30″N 45°56′29″E
- Country: Iran
- Province: Kermanshah
- County: Gilan-e Gharb
- Bakhsh: Central
- Rural District: Direh

Population (2006)
  - Total: 287
- Time zone: UTC+3:30 (IRST)
  - Summer (DST): UTC+4:30 (IRDT)

Anjavarud (Persian: انجاورود, also Romanized as Anjāvarūd and Anjāverūd; also known as Anjarū and Anjauru) is a village in Direh Rural District, in the Central District of Gilan-e Gharb County, Kermanshah Province, Iran. At the 2006 census, its population was 287, in 58 families.
