= Cheshmeh Gelineh =

Cheshmeh Gelineh چشمه گلینه
- Village
- Location within Iran
- Coordinates: 33°58′25″N 46°15′01″E
- Country: Iran
- Province: Kermanshah
- County: Gilan-e Gharb
- Bakhsh: Central
- Rural District: Cheleh

Population (2006)
  - Total: 70
- Time zone: UTC+3:30 (IRST)
  - Summer (DST): UTC+4:30 (IRDT)

Cheshmeh Gelineh (Persian: چشمه گلینه, also Romanized as Cheshmeh Gelīneh; also known as Cheshmeh Gīneh) is a village in Cheleh Rural District, in the Central District of Gilan-e Gharb County, Kermanshah Province, Iran. At the 2006 census, its population was 70, in 15 families.
