= Falvashan =

Falvashan فالوشن
- Village
- Location within Iran
- Coordinates: 34°05′24″N 45°53′45″E
- Country: Iran
- Province: Kermanshah
- County: Gilan-e Gharb
- Bakhsh: Central
- Rural District: Vizhenan

Population (2006)
  - Total: 31
- Time zone: UTC+3:30 (IRST)
  - Summer (DST): UTC+4:30 (IRDT)

Falvashan (Persian: فالوشن, also Romanized as Fālvāshan) is a village in Vizhenan Rural District, in the Central District of Gilan-e Gharb County, Kermanshah Province, Iran. According to the 2006 census, its population comprised 31 individuals, in 8 families.
