= Shelin =

Shelin شلين
- Village
- Location within Iran
- Coordinates: 34°17′20″N 45°54′53″E
- Country: Iran
- Province: Kermanshah
- County: Gilan-e Gharb
- Bakhsh: Central
- Rural District: Direh

Population (2006)
  - Total: 233
- Time zone: UTC+3:30 (IRST)
  - Summer (DST): UTC+4:30 (IRDT)

Shelin (Persian: شلين, also Romanized as Shelīn; also known as Shelī and Shelīn Dīreh) is a village in Direh Rural District, in the Central District of Gilan-e Gharb County, Kermanshah Province, Iran. At the 2006 census, its population was 233, in 58 families.
