= Galuzi =

Galuzi گلوزي
- Village
- Location within Iran
- Coordinates: 34°20′02″N 45°53′57″E
- Country: Iran
- Province: Kermanshah
- County: Gilan-e Gharb
- Bakhsh: Central
- Rural District: Direh

Population (2006)
  - Total: 354
- Time zone: UTC+3:30 (IRST)
  - Summer (DST): UTC+4:30 (IRDT)

Galuzi (Persian: گلوزي, also Romanized as Galūzī; also known as Darakhshandeh, Derakhshandeh Galūzī, Galūzeyā, Galūzī Pāshā, Galūzyā, and Golūzīā) is a village in Direh Rural District, in the Central District of Gilan-e Gharb County, Kermanshah Province, Iran. At the 2006 census, its population was 354, in 75 families.
