= Eyl Shirzadi =

Eyl Shirzadi ايل شيرزادي
- Village
- Country: Iran
- Province: Kermanshah
- County: Gilan-e Gharb
- Bakhsh: Central
- Rural District: Cheleh

Population (2006)
  - Total: 557
- Time zone: UTC+3:30 (IRST)
  - Summer (DST): UTC+4:30 (IRDT)

Eyl Shirzadi (Persian: ايل شيرزادي, also Romanized as Eyl Shīrzādī) is a village in Cheleh Rural District, in the Central District of Gilan-e Gharb County, Kermanshah Province, Iran. At the 2006 census, its population was 557, in 107 families.
