= Nesar Direh =

Village in Kermanshah province, Iran

Nesar Direh Persian: نسارديره
- Village
- Location within Iran
- Coordinates: 34°19′27″N 45°52′04″E
- Country: Iran
- Province: Kermanshah
- County: Gilan-e Gharb
- District: Central
- Rural District: Direh

Population (2016)
  - Total: 729
- Time zone: UTC+3:30 (IRST)

Nesar Direh (Persian: نسارديره) (Note: Also romanized as Nesār Dīreh; also known as Dēhra, Nesār, and Nesāreh Dīreh) is a village in Direh Rural District of the Central District of Gilan-e Gharb County, Kermanshah province, Iran.

== Demographics ==
=== Population ===
At the time of the 2006 National Census, the village's population was 913 in 196 households. The following census in 2011 counted 841 people in 204 households. The 2016 census measured the population of the village as 729 people in 219 households. It was the most populous village in its rural district.
