= Qilan =

Village in Kermanshah province, Iran

Qilan Persian: قيلان
- Village
- Location within Iran
- Coordinates: 34°01′55″N 45°57′05″E
- Country: Iran
- Province: Kermanshah
- County: Gilan-e Gharb
- District: Central
- Rural District: Vizhenan

Population (2016)
  - Total: 339
- Time zone: UTC+3:30 (IRST)

Qilan (Persian: قيلان) (Note: Also romanized as Qīlān) is a village in Vizhenan Rural District of the Central District of Gilan-e Gharb County, Kermanshah province, Iran.

== Demographics ==
=== Population ===
At the time of the 2006 National Census, the village's population was 415 in 83 households. The following census in 2011 counted 394 people in 92 households. The 2016 census measured the population of the village as 339 people in 93 households. It was the most populous village in its rural district.
