= Cheshmeh Pahn-e Alishah =

Cheshmeh Pahn-e Alishah چشمه پهن علیشاه
- Village
- Country: Iran
- Province: Kermanshah
- County: Gilan-e Gharb
- Bakhsh: Central
- Rural District: Cheleh

Population (2006)
  - Total: 198
- Time zone: UTC+3:30 (IRST)
  - Summer (DST): UTC+4:30 (IRDT)

Cheshmeh Pahn-e Alishah (Persian: چشمه پهن علیشاه, also Romanized as Cheshmeh Pahn-e ʿAlīshāh) is a village in Cheleh Rural District, in the Central District of Gilan-e Gharb County, Kermanshah Province, Iran. At the 2006 census, its population was 198, in 53 families.
