= Taiyafeh-ye Hazrat-e Soleyman =

Taiyafeh-ye Hazrat-e Soleyman طايفه حضرتسليمان
- Village
- Location within Iran
- Coordinates: 34°02′11″N 46°08′17″E
- Country: Iran
- Province: Kermanshah
- County: Gilan-e Gharb
- Bakhsh: Central
- Rural District: Cheleh

Population (2006)
  - Total: 104
- Time zone: UTC+3:30 (IRST)
  - Summer (DST): UTC+4:30 (IRDT)

Taiyafeh-ye Hazrat-e Soleyman (Persian: طايفه حضرتسليمان, also Romanized as Ţāīyafeh-ye Ḩaẕrat-e Soleymān; also known as Emāmzādeh Soleymān, Ḩaẕrat-e Soleymān, Ḩazrat-e Soleymān, and Hujrat Sulaiman) is a village in Cheleh Rural District, in the Central District of Gilan-e Gharb County, Kermanshah Province, Iran. At the 2006 census, its population was 104, in 19 families.
