= Sang Dar Meydan =

Sang Dar Meydan (Persian: سنگ درميان) may refer to:

- Sang Dar Meydan-e Olya
- Sang Dar Meydan-e Sofla
