= Cheshmeh Pahn-e Rashid =

Cheshmeh Pahn-e Rashid چشمه پهن رشید
- Village
- Location within Iran
- Coordinates: 34°03′16″N 46°05′33″E
- Country: Iran
- Province: Kermanshah
- County: Gilan-e Gharb
- Bakhsh: Central
- Rural District: Cheleh

Population (2006)
  - Total: 161
- Time zone: UTC+3:30 (IRST)
  - Summer (DST): UTC+4:30 (IRDT)

Cheshmeh Pahn-e Rashid (Persian: چشمه پهن رشید, also Romanized as Cheshmeh Pahn-e Rashīd and Cheshmeh Pahn Rashīd) is a village in Cheleh Rural District, in the Central District of Gilan-e Gharb County, Kermanshah Province, Iran. At the 2006 census, its population was 161, in 36 families.
