= Cheshmeh Murineh, Kermanshah =

Cheshmeh Murineh چشمه مورینه
- Village
- Location within Iran
- Coordinates: 34°08′13″N 45°57′44″E
- Country: Iran
- Province: Kermanshah
- County: Gilan-e Gharb
- Bakhsh: Central
- Rural District: Cheleh

Population (2006)
  - Total: 159
- Time zone: UTC+3:30 (IRST)
  - Summer (DST): UTC+4:30 (IRDT)

Cheshmeh Murineh (Persian: چشمه مورینه, also Romanized as Cheshmeh Mūrīneh; also known as Kolah Shak Mīrzā) is a village in Cheleh Rural District, in the Central District of Gilan-e Gharb County, Kermanshah Province, Iran. At the 2006 census, its population was 159, in 32 families.
