= Cham Surak-e Sofla =

Cham Surak-e Sofla چم سورك سفلي
- Village
- Location within Iran
- Coordinates: 33°58′24″N 45°57′02″E
- Country: Iran
- Province: Kermanshah
- County: Gilan-e Gharb
- Bakhsh: Central
- Rural District: Vizhenan

Population (2006)
  - Total: 124
- Time zone: UTC+3:30 (IRST)
  - Summer (DST): UTC+4:30 (IRDT)

Cham Surak-e Sofla (Persian: چم سورك سفلي, also Romanized as Cham Sūrak-e Soflá; also known as Cham Sūrag-e Soflá) is a village in Vizhenan Rural District, in the Central District of Gilan-e Gharb County, Kermanshah Province, Iran. At the 2006 census, its population was 124, in 25 families.
