= Kolah Jub-e Karmi =

Kolah Jub-e Karmi كله جوب كرمي
- Village
- Country: Iran
- Province: Kermanshah
- County: Gilan-e Gharb
- Bakhsh: Central
- Rural District: Howmeh

Population (2006)
  - Total: 65
- Time zone: UTC+3:30 (IRST)
  - Summer (DST): UTC+4:30 (IRDT)

Kolah Jub-e Karmi (Persian: كله جوب كرمي, also Romanized as Kolah Jūb-e Karmī) is a village in Howmeh Rural District, in the Central District of Gilan-e Gharb County, Kermanshah Province, Iran. At the 2006 census, its population was 65, in 14 families.
