= Gol Kheyrak-e Sofla =

Gol Kheyrak-e Sofla گل خيرك سفلي
- Village
- Location within Iran
- Coordinates: 34°00′27″N 45°56′54″E
- Country: Iran
- Province: Kermanshah
- County: Gilan-e Gharb
- Bakhsh: Central
- Rural District: Vizhenan

Population (2006)
  - Total: 70
- Time zone: UTC+3:30 (IRST)
  - Summer (DST): UTC+4:30 (IRDT)

Gol Kheyrak-e Sofla (Persian: گل خيرك سفلي, also Romanized as Gol Kheyrak-e Soflá; also known as Gol Kheyrak) is a village in Vizhenan Rural District, in the Central District of Gilan-e Gharb County, Kermanshah Province, Iran. At the 2006 census, its population was 70, in 19 families.
