= Sang Dar Meydan-e Sofla =

Sang Dar Meydan-e Sofla سنگ درميان سفلي
- Village
- Location within Iran
- Coordinates: 34°21′55″N 45°51′18″E
- Country: Iran
- Province: Kermanshah
- County: Gilan-e Gharb
- Bakhsh: Central
- Rural District: Direh

Population (2006)
  - Total: 97
- Time zone: UTC+3:30 (IRST)
  - Summer (DST): UTC+4:30 (IRDT)

Sang Dar Meydan-e Sofla (Persian: سنگ درميان سفلي, also Romanized as Sang Dar Meydān-e Soflá) is a village in Direh Rural District, in the Central District of Gilan-e Gharb County, Kermanshah Province, Iran. At the 2006 census, its population was 97, in 21 families.
