= Jub Baghan-e Olya =

Jub Baghan-e Olya جوبباغان عليا
- Village
- Location within Iran
- Coordinates: 34°17′47″N 45°54′25″E
- Country: Iran
- Province: Kermanshah
- County: Gilan-e Gharb
- Bakhsh: Central
- Rural District: Direh

Population (2006)
  - Total: 120
- Time zone: UTC+3:30 (IRST)
  - Summer (DST): UTC+4:30 (IRDT)

Jub Baghan-e Olya (Persian: جوبباغان عليا, also Romanized as Jūb Bāghān-e ‘Olyā) is a village in Direh Rural District, in the Central District of Gilan-e Gharb County, Kermanshah Province, Iran. At the 2006 census, its population was 120, in 26 families.
