= Gur-e Sefid, Kermanshah =

Village in Kermanshah province, Iran

Gur-e Sefid Persian: گور سفيد
- Village
- Location within Iran
- Coordinates: 34°13′03″N 45°50′39″E
- Country: Iran
- Province: Kermanshah
- County: Gilan-e Gharb
- District: Central
- Rural District: Howmeh

Population (2016)
  - Total: 587
- Time zone: UTC+3:30 (IRST)

Gur-e Sefid (Persian: گور سفيد) (Note: Also romanized as Gur Sefid and Gūr Sefīd; also known as Garagān-e Gūr-e Sefīd) is a village in, and the capital of, Howmeh Rural District of the Central District of Gilan-e Gharb County, Kermanshah province, Iran.

== Demographics ==
=== Population ===
At the time of the 2006 National Census, the village's population was 811 in 181 households. The following census in 2011 counted 727 people in 171 households. The 2016 census measured the population of the village as 587 people in 178 households. It was the most populous village in its rural district.
