= Independence Street (Ivano-Frankivsk) =

Street in Ivano-Frankivsk, Ukraine

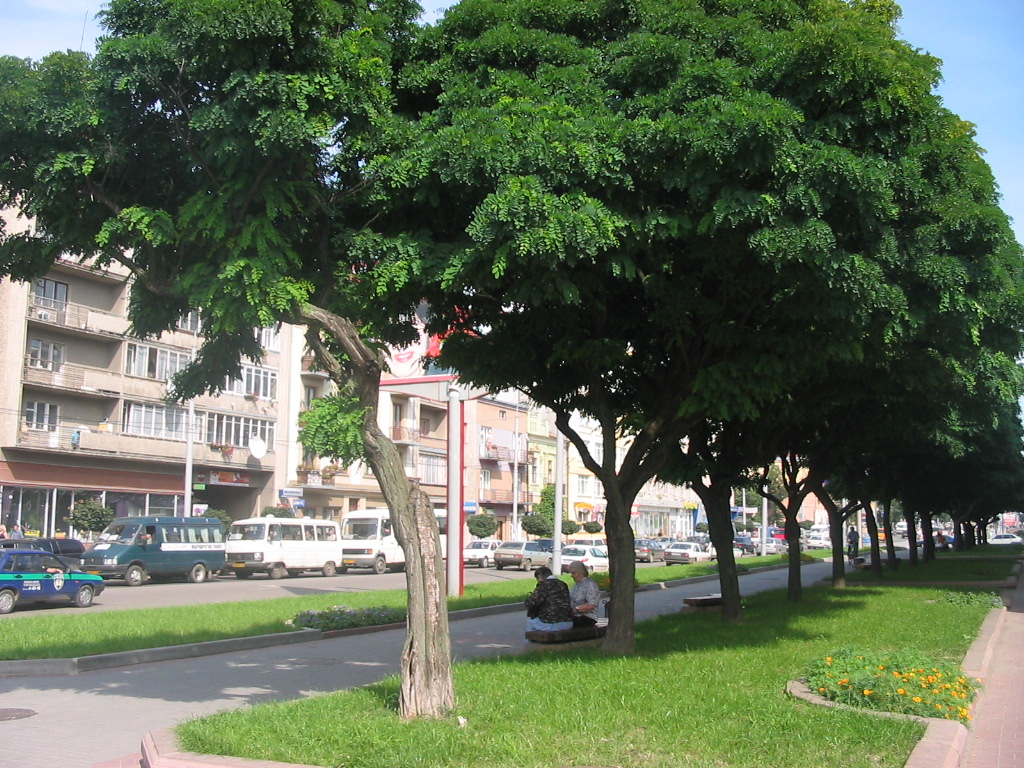
- Between intersections of Franka and Lepkoho
- Native name: Вулиця Незалежності (Ukrainian)
- Former name(s): Tysmenytsia Road; Sapieha Street; Soviet Street
- Length: 2,600 m (8,500 ft)
- Addresses: 4 Business-Center "Kyiv"; 11 Hausvald Building; 27A Regional Music-Drama Theater; 48 Prykarpattransgaz
- Location: Central and Eastern Ivano-Frankivsk, Ukraine
- west end: Viche Maidan; Halych Street
- Major junctions: 18
- east end: Tysmenytsia Street; Bystrytsia of Nadvirna

Independence Street (Ukrainian: Вулиця Незалежності, vulytsia Nezalezhnosti) is considered the central street of Ivano-Frankivsk. It runs from west to east and passes the original city's center 250–300 meters south from it. Starting at the west side of the Viche Maidan what is known as the Halych Street Independence Street makes its way along the old Tysmenytsia road east to Bystrytsia river, passing which it changes its name to Tysmenytsia Street running through the city's suburbs towards the city of Tysmenytsia.

== Brief history ==
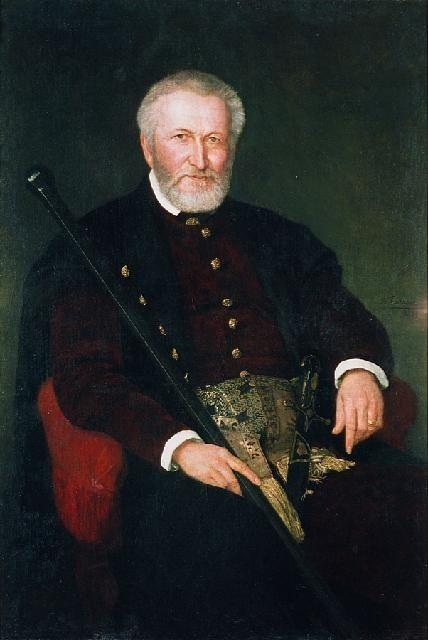
Leon Sapieha

The street is not the oldest in the city and was formed after the demolition of the city's fortifications at the end of the 18th century. The street began to gain its importance with establishment of railroad through the city around the 1860s, which was passing the old Stanislawow on the north-eastern side running from the north to the south-east. Until 1869 the street, unknown whether officially or not, was simply referred to as Tysmenytsia Road. On July 1, 1869, at the 300 Anniversary of the Union of Lublin the street was officially renamed into Leon Sapieha Street (Ulica Sapiezinskogo) after Leon Sapieha, a Polish parliamentarian. That name the street carried almost until the Soviet invasion in 1939. It was during that time that Independence Street was becoming the central street of the city. With the establishment of the West Ukrainian People's Republic in the region (1918–1922), the name of the street changed to Shevchenko Street (1919–1922) after Taras Shevchenko. With the establishment of the Soviet regime and until 1993 with the displacing the city's Lenin monument the street was called Soviet.

== Stometrivka ==
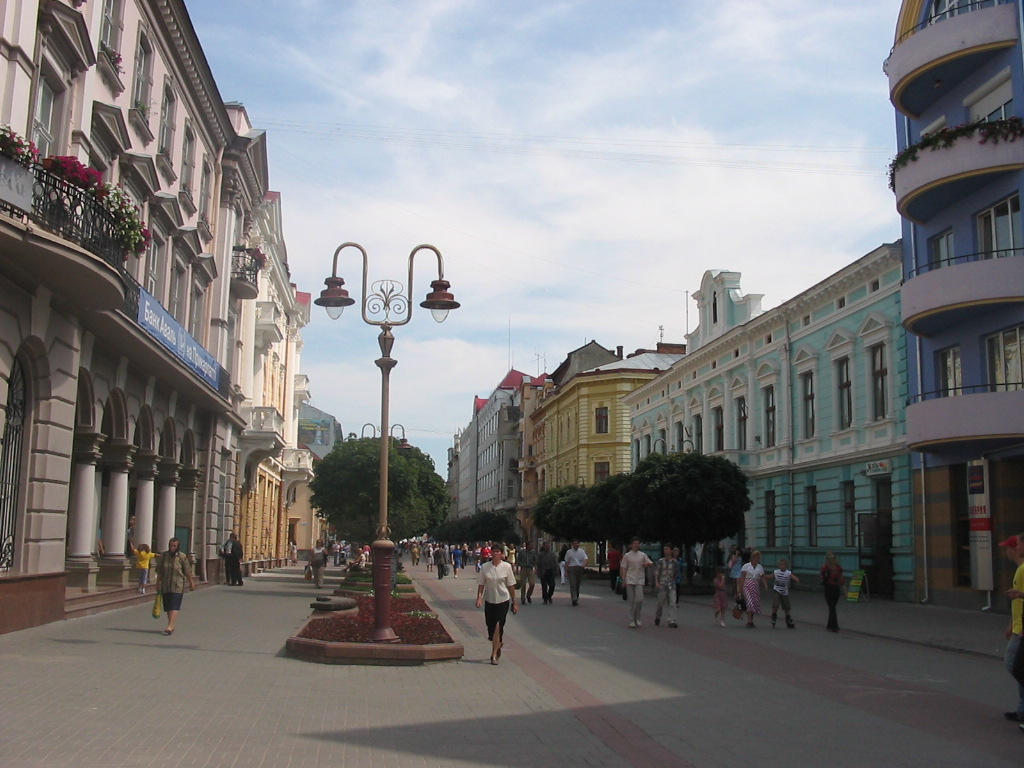
The Stometrivka in 2004

The Stometrivka (Ukrainian: Стометрівка), literally meaning "Hundred Metres", is the beginning of Independence Street. This name is conditional, since the actual length of the Stometrivka is 450 metres. In addition, the beginning of the hundred metres is actually the second centre of the city (the first and historical centre is Market Square).

The Stometrivka was established in the 1980s as one of the first pedestrian zones in Ukraine. In the Stometrivka, there are bookshops, other shops, cafes, cafeterias, pizzerias, and restaurants, as well as a monument to the artist Opanas Zalyvaha. The Musical Fountain at Viche Maidan is constructed in such a way that people might go under its streams and stay dry. Therefore, this is a favourite meeting place for city residents and tourists, a place to relax and take evening walks.

== Architectural monuments ==
- monument of Ivan Franko
- Regional Music-Drama Theater
- architectural ensemble of stometrivka
- Gartenberg's Passage (shopping mall "Malva")
- Hausvald Building
- others

== Cultural sights ==
- The city's youth library
- Cinema theater "Kosmos" (former historical Jewish cemetery)
- The city's children puppet theater
- others

== List of intersecting streets ==
- Halych Street
- Levko Bachynsky Street
- Dmytro Vitovsky Street
- Markian Shashkevych Street
- Ivan Vahylevych Street
- Sich Riflemen Street
- Ivan Franko Street
- Bohdan Lepky Street
- Stepan Bandera Street
- Mariyka Pidhiryanka Street
- Dashevych Street
- Roman Shukhevych Street
- Shota Rustaveli Street
- Railway Street
- Anton Chekhov Street
- Khryplyn Street
- Truskavets Street
- Crimea Street
- Traktor Street
- Uhornyky Street
- Mykytyntsi Street
- Mykytyntsi Lane
- Volodymyr Ivasyuk Street
- others
