= Qomra Ali =

Village in Kermanshah province, Iran

Qomra Ali Persian: قمراعلي
- Village
- Location within Iran
- Coordinates: 34°02′58″N 46°06′19″E
- Country: Iran
- Province: Kermanshah
- County: Gilan-e Gharb
- District: Central
- Rural District: Cheleh

Population (2016)
  - Total: 538
- Time zone: UTC+3:30 (IRST)

Qomra Ali (Persian: قمراعلي) (Note: Also romanized as Qomrā ʿAlī) is a village in, and the capital of, Cheleh Rural District of the Central District of Gilan-e Gharb County, Kermanshah province, Iran.

== Demographics ==
=== Population ===
At the time of the 2006 National Census, the village's population was 570 in 135 households. The following census in 2011 counted 620 people in 170 households. The 2016 census measured the population of the village as 538 people in 178 households. It was the most populous village in its rural district.
