= Cham Surak-e Vosta =

Cham Surak-e Vosta چم سورك وسطي
- Village
- Location within Iran
- Coordinates: 33°58′44″N 45°56′56″E
- Country: Iran
- Province: Kermanshah
- County: Gilan-e Gharb
- Bakhsh: Central
- Rural District: Vizhenan

Population (2006)
  - Total: 119
- Time zone: UTC+3:30 (IRST)
  - Summer (DST): UTC+4:30 (IRDT)

Cham Surak-e Vosta (Persian: چم سورك وسطي, also Romanized as Cham Sūrak-e Vostá; also known as Cham Sūrag-e Vostá) is a village in Vizhenan Rural District, in the Central District of Gilan-e Gharb County, Kermanshah Province, Iran. At the 2006 census, its population was 119, in 27 families.
