= Mir Mirab-e Sofla =

Mir Mirab-e Sofla ميرميراب سفلي
- Village
- Location within Iran
- Coordinates: 34°03′54″N 45°53′23″E
- Country: Iran
- Province: Kermanshah
- County: Gilan-e Gharb
- Bakhsh: Central
- Rural District: Vizhenan

Population (2006)
  - Total: 46
- Time zone: UTC+3:30 (IRST)
  - Summer (DST): UTC+4:30 (IRDT)

Mir Mirab-e Sofla (Persian: ميرميراب سفلي, also Romanized as Mīr Mīrāb-e Soflá; also known as Mīleh Mīrāb-e Soflá) is a village in Vizhenan Rural District, in the Central District of Gilan-e Gharb County, Kermanshah Province, Iran. At the 2006 census, its population was 46, in 9 families.
