= Ban Meydan-e Abdollah =

Ban Meydan-e Abdollah بان میدان عبدالله
- Village
- Location within Iran
- Coordinates: 34°07′02″N 46°01′07″E
- Country: Iran
- Province: Kermanshah
- County: Gilan-e Gharb
- Bakhsh: Central
- Rural District: Cheleh

Population (2006)
  - Total: 77
- Time zone: UTC+3:30 (IRST)
  - Summer (DST): UTC+4:30 (IRDT)

Ban Meydan-e Abdollah (Persian: بان میدان عبدالله, also Romanized as Bān Meydān-e ‘Abdollāh; also known as Bāmīān ‘Abdollāh, Bānmeydān, and Bān Meydān-e Soflā) is a village in Cheleh Rural District, in the Central District of Gilan-e Gharb County, Kermanshah Province, Iran. At the 2006 census, its population was 77, in 17 families.
