= Taiyafeh-ye Shaeran =

Taiyafeh-ye Shaeran طايفه شاعران
- Village
- Location within Iran
- Coordinates: 34°01′58″N 46°10′34″E
- Country: Iran
- Province: Kermanshah
- County: Gilan-e Gharb
- Bakhsh: Central
- Rural District: Cheleh

Population (2006)
  - Total: 161
- Time zone: UTC+3:30 (IRST)
  - Summer (DST): UTC+4:30 (IRDT)

Taiyafeh-ye Shaeran (Persian: طايفه شاعران, also Romanized as Ţāīyafeh-ye Shā‘erān; also known as Shā‘erān and Shā‘erān-e Cheleh) is a village in Cheleh Rural District, in the Central District of Gilan-e Gharb County, Kermanshah Province, Iran. At the 2006 census, its population was 161, in 32 families.
