= Sheykh Sorkh ol Din-e Olya =

Sheykh Sorkh ol Din-e Olya شيخ سرخ الدين عليا
- Village
- Location within Iran
- Coordinates: 34°09′59″N 45°52′31″E
- Country: Iran
- Province: Kermanshah
- County: Gilan-e Gharb
- Bakhsh: Central
- Rural District: Howmeh

Population (2006)
  - Total: 61
- Time zone: UTC+3:30 (IRST)
  - Summer (DST): UTC+4:30 (IRDT)

Sheykh Sorkh ol Din-e Olya (Persian: شيخ سرخ الدين عليا, also Romanized as Sheykh Sorkh ol Dīn-e ‘Olyā and Sheykh Sorkh od Dīn-e ‘Olyā; also known as Sheykh Seyr Ad Dīn and Sheykh Sorkh ed Dīn) is a village in Howmeh Rural District, in the Central District of Gilan-e Gharb County, Kermanshah Province, Iran. According to the 2006 census, its population was 61, residing in 13 families.
