= Cheshmeh Pahn-e Fereydun =

Cheshmeh Pahn-e Fereydun چشمه پهن فریدون
- Village
- Country: Iran
- Province: Kermanshah
- County: Gilan-e Gharb
- Bakhsh: Central
- Rural District: Cheleh

Population (2006)
  - Total: 204
- Time zone: UTC+3:30 (IRST)
  - Summer (DST): UTC+4:30 (IRDT)

Cheshmeh Pahn-e Fereydun (Persian: چشمه پهن فریدون, also Romanized as Cheshmeh Pahn-e Fereydūn) is a village in Cheleh Rural District, in the Central District of Gilan-e Gharb County, Kermanshah Province, Iran. At the 2006 census, its population was 204, in 47 families.
