= Nian, Kermanshah =

Village in Kermanshah province, Iran

Nian Persian: نيان
- Village
- Location within Iran
- Coordinates: 34°02′07″N 45°57′17″E
- Country: Iran
- Province: Kermanshah
- County: Gilan-e Gharb
- District: Central
- Rural District: Vizhenan

Population (2016)
  - Total: 239
- Time zone: UTC+3:30 (IRST)

Nian (Persian: نيان) (Note: Also romanized as Nīān; also known as Nīānqīlān) is a village in, and the capital of, Vizhenan Rural District of the Central District of Gilan-e Gharb County, Kermanshah province, Iran.

== Demographics ==
=== Population ===
At the time of the 2006 National Census, the village's population was 195 in 45 households. The following census in 2011 counted 217 people in 56 households. The 2016 census measured the population of the village as 239 people in 70 households.
