= Kolah Deraz-e Sofla =

Kolah Deraz-e Sofla كلاه درازسفلي
- Village
- Location within Iran
- Coordinates: 34°04′24″N 46°03′34″E
- Country: Iran
- Province: Kermanshah
- County: Gilan-e Gharb
- Bakhsh: Central
- Rural District: Cheleh

Population (2006)
  - Total: 649
- Time zone: UTC+3:30 (IRST)
  - Summer (DST): UTC+4:30 (IRDT)

Kolah Deraz-e Sofla (Persian: كلاه درازسفلي, also Romanized as Kolāh Derāz-e Soflá; also known as Kolāh Derāz-e Āqājān) is a village in Cheleh Rural District, in the Central District of Gilan-e Gharb County, Kermanshah Province, Iran. At the 2006 census, its population was 649, in 141 families.
