= Gol Kheyrak-e Olya =

Gol Kheyrak-e Olya گل خيرك عليا
- Village
- Location within Iran
- Coordinates: 33°59′46″N 45°56′47″E
- Country: Iran
- Province: Kermanshah
- County: Gilan-e Gharb
- Bakhsh: Central
- Rural District: Vizhenan

Population (2006)
  - Total: 100
- Time zone: UTC+3:30 (IRST)
  - Summer (DST): UTC+4:30 (IRDT)

Gol Kheyrak-e Olya (Persian: گل خيرك عليا, also Romanized as Gol Kheyrak-e ‘Olyā; also known as Gol Kheyrak) is a village in Vizhenan Rural District, in the Central District of Gilan-e Gharb County, Kermanshah Province, Iran. At the 2006 census, its population was 100, in 25 families.
