= Galuzi-ye Davud =

Galuzi-ye Davud گلوزي داود
- Village
- Location within Iran
- Coordinates: 34°20′00″N 45°54′00″E
- Country: Iran
- Province: Kermanshah
- County: Gilan-e Gharb
- Bakhsh: Central
- Rural District: Direh

Population (2006)
  - Total: 31
- Time zone: UTC+3:30 (IRST)
  - Summer (DST): UTC+4:30 (IRDT)

Galuzi-ye Davud (Persian: گلوزي داود, also Romanized as Galūzī-ye Dāvūd; also known as Dārābī and Dārrābī) is a village in Direh Rural District, in the Central District of Gilan-e Gharb County, Kermanshah Province, Iran. At the 2006 census, its population was 31, in 7 families.
