= Kolah Deraz-e Vosta =

Kolah Deraz-e Vosta كلاه درازوسطي
- Village
- Location within Iran
- Coordinates: 34°04′30″N 46°03′19″E
- Country: Iran
- Province: Kermanshah
- County: Gilan-e Gharb
- Bakhsh: Central
- Rural District: Cheleh

Population (2006)
  - Total: 212
- Time zone: UTC+3:30 (IRST)
  - Summer (DST): UTC+4:30 (IRDT)

Kolah Deraz-e Vosta (Persian: كلاه درازوسطي, also Romanized as Kolāh Derāz-e Vosţá; also known as Kolāh Derāz-e Javānmīr, Kolāh Derāz-e Javānmīr-e Soflá, and Ūloyar) is a village in Cheleh Rural District, in the Central District of Gilan-e Gharb County, Kermanshah Province, Iran. At the 2006 census, its population was 212, in 55 families.
