= Taiyafeh-ye Shirzadi =

Taiyafeh-ye Shirzadi طايفه شيرزادي
- Village
- Location within Iran
- Coordinates: 34°01′38″N 46°10′35″E
- Country: Iran
- Province: Kermanshah
- County: Gilan-e Gharb
- Bakhsh: Central
- Rural District: Cheleh

Population (2006)
  - Total: 132
- Time zone: UTC+3:30 (IRST)
  - Summer (DST): UTC+4:30 (IRDT)

Taiyafeh-ye Shirzadi (Persian: طايفه شيرزادي, also Romanized as Ţāīyafeh-ye Shīrzādī; also known as Karkūshk-e Shīrzādī, Shīrzādī, and Taqī Shīrzādī) is a village in Cheleh Rural District, in the Central District of Gilan-e Gharb County, Kermanshah Province, Iran. At the 2006 census, its population was 132, in 28 families.
