= Abd ol Aziz, Kermanshah =

Abd ol Aziz عبدالعزیز
- Village
- Location within Iran
- Coordinates: 34°01′54″N 46°08′51″E
- Country: Iran
- Province: Kermanshah
- County: Gilan-e Gharb
- Bakhsh: Central
- Rural District: Cheleh

Population (2006)
  - Total: 231
- Time zone: UTC+3:30 (IRST)
  - Summer (DST): UTC+4:30 (IRDT)

Abd ol Aziz (Persian: عبدالعزیز, also Romanized as ‘Abd ol ‘Azīz; also known as ‘Abd ol ‘Azīz-e Cheleh and ‘Abdollāh ‘Azīz-e Cheleh) is a village in Cheleh Rural District, in the Central District of Gilan-e Gharb County, Kermanshah Province, Iran. At the 2006 census, its population was 231, in 48 families.
