= Kolah Jub-e Sofla, Kermanshah =

Kolah Jub-e Sofla كله جوب سفلي
- Village
- Location within Iran
- Coordinates: 34°11′25″N 45°52′46″E
- Country: Iran
- Province: Kermanshah
- County: Gilan-e Gharb
- Bakhsh: Central
- Rural District: Howmeh

Population (2006)
  - Total: 217
- Time zone: UTC+3:30 (IRST)
  - Summer (DST): UTC+4:30 (IRDT)

Kolah Jub-e Sofla (Persian: كله جوب سفلي, also Romanized as Kolah Jūb-e Soflá and Kolāh Jūb-e Soflá) is a village in Howmeh Rural District, in the Central District of Gilan-e Gharb County, Kermanshah Province, Iran. At the 2006 census, its population was 217, in 45 families.
