= Sheykh Sorkh ol Din-e Sofla =

Sheykh Sorkh ol Din-e Sofla شيخ سرخ الدين سفلي
- Village
- Location within Iran
- Coordinates: 34°10′19″N 45°53′38″E
- Country: Iran
- Province: Kermanshah
- County: Gilan-e Gharb
- Bakhsh: Central
- Rural District: Howmeh

Population (2006)
  - Total: 146
- Time zone: UTC+3:30 (IRST)
  - Summer (DST): UTC+4:30 (IRDT)

Sheykh Sorkh ol Din-e Sofla (Persian: شيخ سرخ الدين سفلي, also Romanized as Sheykh Sorkh ol Dīn-e Soflá and Sheykh Sorkh od Dīn-e Soflá; also known as Sheykh Sharḩ ed Dīn) is a village in Howmeh Rural District, in the Central District of Gilan-e Gharb County, Kermanshah Province, Iran. At the 2006 census, its population was 146, in 28 families.
