= Ruiban-e Kuchak =

Ruiban-e Kuchak رويبان كوچك
- Village
- Location within Iran
- Coordinates: 34°19′55″N 45°44′56″E
- Country: Iran
- Province: Kermanshah
- County: Gilan-e Gharb
- Bakhsh: Central
- Rural District: Howmeh

Population (2006)
  - Total: 85
- Time zone: UTC+3:30 (IRST)
  - Summer (DST): UTC+4:30 (IRDT)

Ruiban-e Kuchak (Persian: رويبان كوچك, also Romanized as Rū’ībān-e Kūchak; also known as Ḩeydarīyeh Kūchak and Rūbīān-e Kūchak) is a village in Howmeh Rural District, in the Central District of Gilan-e Gharb County, Kermanshah Province, Iran. At the 2006 census, its population was 85, in 18 families. The village is populated by Kurds.
