= Qaleh Meydan =

Qaleh Meydan or Qaleh-i-Maidan or Qaleh-ye Meydan or Qallah-i-Maidan (Persian: قلعه ميدان) may refer to:

- Qaleh-ye Meydan, Khuzestan
- Qaleh Meydan, Razavi Khorasan
