= Kolah Jub-e Olya-ye Yek =

Village in Kermanshah, Iran

Kolah Jub-e Olya-ye Yek كله جوب عليايك
- Village
- Location within Iran
- Coordinates: 34°11′14″N 45°53′06″E
- Country: Iran
- Province: Kermanshah
- County: Gilan-e Gharb
- Bakhsh: Central
- Rural District: Howmeh

Population (2006)
  - Total: 223
- Time zone: UTC+3:30 (IRST)
  - Summer (DST): UTC+4:30 (IRDT)

Kolah Jub-e Olya-ye Yek (Persian: كله جوب عليايك, also Romanized as Kolah Jūb-e ‘Olyā-ye Yek; also known as Kaleh Jūb-e ‘Olyā, Kolah Jūb-e Bālā, Kolāh Jūb-e Kīānī, Kolah Jūb-e ‘Olyā, and Kolah Jū ‘Olyā) is a village in Howmeh Rural District, in the Central District of Gilan-e Gharb County, Kermanshah Province, Iran. At the 2006 census, its population was 223, in 46 families.
