= Varegah-e Olya =

Village in Kermanshah, Iran

Varegah-e Olya وارگه عليا
- Village
- Location within Iran
- Coordinates: 33°57′48″N 46°16′27″E
- Country: Iran
- Province: Kermanshah
- County: Gilan-e Gharb
- Bakhsh: Central
- Rural District: Cheleh

Population (2006)
  - Total: 173
- Time zone: UTC+3:30 (IRST)
  - Summer (DST): UTC+4:30 (IRDT)

Varegah-e Olya (Persian: وارگه عليا, also Romanized as Vāregah-e ‘Olyā; also known as Sar Cheleh, Sarcheleh Vāregah-e ‘Olyā, Sar Chelleh, and Vāregah) is a village in Cheleh Rural District, in the Central District of Gilan-e Gharb County, Kermanshah Province, Iran. At the 2006 census, its population was 173, in 40 families.
