= Behabad-e Qobasiah =

Behabad-e Qobasiah به ابادقباسيان
- Village
- Location within Iran
- Coordinates: 34°11′21″N 45°51′51″E
- Country: Iran
- Province: Kermanshah
- County: Gilan-e Gharb
- Bakhsh: Central
- Rural District: Howmeh

Population (2006)
  - Total: 53
- Time zone: UTC+3:30 (IRST)
  - Summer (DST): UTC+4:30 (IRDT)

Behabad-e Qobasiah (Persian: به ابادقباسيان, also Romanized as Behābād-e Qobāsīāh; also known as Beyābād and Bīābād-e Qobā Sīāh) is a village in Howmeh Rural District, in the Central District of Gilan-e Gharb County, Kermanshah Province, Iran. At the 2006 census, its population was 53, in 10 families.
