= Varegah-e Sofla =

Varegah-e Sofla وارگه سفلي
- Village
- Location within Iran
- Coordinates: 33°57′34″N 46°16′12″E
- Country: Iran
- Province: Kermanshah
- County: Gilan-e Gharb
- Bakhsh: Central
- Rural District: Cheleh

Population (2006)
  - Total: 347
- Time zone: UTC+3:30 (IRST)
  - Summer (DST): UTC+4:30 (IRDT)

Varegah-e Sofla (Persian: وارگه سفلي, also Romanized as Vāregah-e Soflá; also known as Sarcheleh Vāregah-e Soflá and Vāregah) is a village in Cheleh Rural District, in the Central District of Gilan-e Gharb County, Kermanshah Province, Iran. At the 2006 census, its population was 347, in 83 families.
