= Behabad-e Saleh =

Behabad-e Saleh به ابادصالح
- Village
- Location within Iran
- Coordinates: 34°11′44″N 45°51′40″E
- Country: Iran
- Province: Kermanshah
- County: Gilan-e Gharb
- Bakhsh: Central
- Rural District: Howmeh

Population (2006)
  - Total: 207
- Time zone: UTC+3:30 (IRST)
  - Summer (DST): UTC+4:30 (IRDT)

Behabad-e Saleh (Persian: به ابادصالح, also Romanized as Behābād-e Şāleḩ; also known as Behābād and Bīābād-e Şāleḩ) is a village in Howmeh Rural District, in the Central District of Gilan-e Gharb County, Kermanshah Province, Iran. At the 2006 census, its population was 207, in 47 families.
