= Shahrak-e Jub Baghan =

Village in Kermanshah province, Iran

Shahrak-e Jub Baghan Persian: شهرك جوب باغان
- Village
- Location within Iran
- Country: Iran
- Province: Kermanshah
- County: Gilan-e Gharb
- District: Central
- Rural District: Direh

Population (2016)
  - Total: 434
- Time zone: UTC+3:30 (IRST)

Shahrak-e Jub Baghan (Persian: شهرك جوب باغان) (Note: Also romanized as Shahrak-e Jūb Bāghān; also known as Chub Baghan (چوب باغان)) is a village in Direh Rural District of the Central District of Gilan-e Gharb County, Kermanshah province, Iran.

== Demographics ==
=== Population ===
At the time of the 2007 National Census, the village's population was 517 in 118 households. The following census in 2011 counted 589 people in 151 households. The 2016 census measured the population of the village as 434 people in 140 households.
