= Meydan Tarreh Barahvaz =

Meydan Tarreh Barahvaz ميدان تره باراهواز
- Village
- Country: Iran
- Province: Khuzestan
- County: Ahvaz
- Bakhsh: Central
- Rural District: Elhayi

Population (2006)
  - Total: 129
- Time zone: UTC+3:30 (IRST)
  - Summer (DST): UTC+4:30 (IRDT)

Meydan Tarreh Barahvaz (Persian: ميدان تره باراهواز, also Romanized as Meydān Tarreh Bārāhvāz) is a village in Elhayi Rural District, in the Central District of Ahvaz County, Khuzestan Province, Iran. At the 2006 census, its population was 129, in 26 families.
