= Meydan-e Olya =

Meydan-e Olya ميدان عليا
- Village
- Location within Iran
- Coordinates: 38°43′09″N 44°47′08″E
- Country: Iran
- Province: West Azerbaijan
- County: Khoy
- Bakhsh: Central
- Rural District: Dizaj

Population (2006)
  - Total: 92
- Time zone: UTC+3:30 (IRST)
  - Summer (DST): UTC+4:30 (IRDT)

Meydan-e Olya (Persian: ميدان عليا, also Romanized as Meydān-e ‘Olyā; also known as Meydān Lār-e Bālā) is a village in Dizaj Rural District, in the Central District of Khoy County, West Azerbaijan Province, Iran. At the 2006 census, its population was 92, in 23 families.
