= Cheshmeh Pahn, Hamadan =

Cheshmeh Pahn چشمه پهن
- Village
- Location within Iran
- Coordinates: 34°33′04″N 48°44′03″E
- Country: Iran
- Province: Hamadan
- County: Malayer
- Bakhsh: Jowkar
- Rural District: Tork-e Gharbi

Population (2006)
  - Total: 101
- Time zone: UTC+3:30 (IRST)
  - Summer (DST): UTC+4:30 (IRDT)

Cheshmeh Pahn (Persian: چشمه پهن, also Romanized as Chashmeh Pahn; also known as Cheshmeh Pahn Nanaj) is a village in Tork-e Gharbi Rural District, Jowkar District, Malayer County, Hamadan Province, Iran. At the 2006 census, its population was 101, in 26 families.
