= Darab, Dalahu =

Darab داراب
- Village
- Location within Iran
- Coordinates: 34°30′13″N 45°57′21″E
- Country: Iran
- Province: Kermanshah
- County: Dalahu
- Bakhsh: Central
- Rural District: Ban Zardeh

Population (2006)
  - Total: 714
- Time zone: UTC+3:30 (IRST)
  - Summer (DST): UTC+4:30 (IRDT)

Darab (Persian: داراب, also Romanized as Dārāb) is a village in Ban Zardeh Rural District, in the Central District of Dalahu County, Kermanshah Province, Iran. At the 2006 census, its population was 714, in 132 families.
