= Meydan, West Azerbaijan =

Meydan ميدان
- Village
- Location within Iran
- Coordinates: 39°07′11″N 44°25′34″E
- Country: Iran
- Province: West Azerbaijan
- County: Chaldoran
- Bakhsh: Central
- Rural District: Chaldoran-e Shomali

Population (2006)
  - Total: 24
- Time zone: UTC+3:30 (IRST)
  - Summer (DST): UTC+4:30 (IRDT)

Meydan (Persian: ميدان, also Romanized as Meydān) is a village in Chaldoran-e Shomali Rural District, in the Central District of Chaldoran County, West Azerbaijan Province, Iran. At the 2006 census, its population was 24, in 8 families.
