= Cheshmeh Pahn-e Nanaj =

Cheshmeh Pahn-e Nanaj چشمه پهن ننج
- Village
- Location within Iran
- Coordinates: 34°27′32″N 48°46′03″E
- Country: Iran
- Province: Hamadan
- County: Malayer
- Bakhsh: Jowkar
- Rural District: Jowkar

Population (2006)
  - Total: 185
- Time zone: UTC+3:30 (IRST)
  - Summer (DST): UTC+4:30 (IRDT)

Cheshmeh Pahn-e Nanaj (Persian: چشمه پهن ننج, also Romanized as Cheshmeh Pahn Nanaj; also known as Chashmeh Pahn, Cheshmeh Pahn, and Cheshmeh Pahn Tataj) is a village in Jowkar Rural District, Jowkar District, Malayer County, Hamadan Province, Iran. At the 2006 census, its population was 185, in 36 families.
