= Buabad =

Buabad بواباد
- Village
- Location within Iran
- Coordinates: 32°23′52″N 59°47′04″E
- Country: Iran
- Province: South Khorasan
- County: Sarbisheh
- Bakhsh: Central
- Rural District: Momenabad

Population (2006)
  - Total: 95
- Time zone: UTC+3:30 (IRST)
  - Summer (DST): UTC+4:30 (IRDT)

Buabad (Persian: بواباد, also Romanized as Būābād; also known as Behābād and Bovārā) is a village in Momenabad Rural District, in the Central District of Sarbisheh County, South Khorasan Province, Iran. According to the 2006 census, it had a population of 95 in 27 families.
