= Meydan-e Khodaverdi =

Meydan-e Khodaverdi میدان خداوردی
- Village
- Location within Iran
- Coordinates: 32°46′51″N 48°15′02″E
- Country: Iran
- Province: Khuzestan
- County: Andimeshk
- Bakhsh: Alvar-e Garmsiri
- Rural District: Qilab

Population (2006)
  - Total: 49
- Time zone: UTC+3:30 (IRST)
  - Summer (DST): UTC+4:30 (IRDT)

Meydan-e Khodaverdi (Persian: میدان خداوردی, also Romanized as Meydān-e Khodāverdī) is a village in Qilab Rural District, Alvar-e Garmsiri District, Andimeshk County, Khuzestan Province, Iran. At the 2006 census, its population was 49, in 9 families.
