= Varegah, Kermanshah =

Varegah وارگه
- Village
- Location within Iran
- Coordinates: 33°57′30″N 46°27′04″E
- Country: Iran
- Province: Kermanshah
- County: Gilan-e Gharb
- Bakhsh: Govar
- Rural District: Gowavar

Population (2006)
  - Total: 242
- Time zone: UTC+3:30 (IRST)
  - Summer (DST): UTC+4:30 (IRDT)

Varegah (Persian: وارگه, also Romanized as Vāregah) is a village in Gowavar Rural District, Govar District, Gilan-e Gharb County, Kermanshah Province, Iran. At the 2006 census, its population was 242, living in 46 families.
