= Meydanlar =

Meydanlar ميدانلار
- Village
- Location within Iran
- Coordinates: 38°52′24″N 47°17′22″E
- Country: Iran
- Province: East Azerbaijan
- County: Ahar
- Bakhsh: Hurand
- Rural District: Dodangeh

Population (2006)
  - Total: 80
- Time zone: UTC+3:30 (IRST)
  - Summer (DST): UTC+4:30 (IRDT)

Meydanlar (Persian: ميدانلار, also Romanized as Meydānlār and Meydān-e Lār) is a village in Dodangeh Rural District, Hurand District, Ahar County, East Azerbaijan Province, Iran. At the 2006 census, its population was 80, in 20 families.
