= Kalleh Jub-e Hajj Ali =

Kalleh Jub-e Hajj Ali كله جوب حاج علي
- Village
- Location within Iran
- Coordinates: 33°38′38″N 48°35′16″E
- Country: Iran
- Province: Lorestan
- County: Khorramabad
- Bakhsh: Bayravand
- Rural District: Beyranvand-e Jonubi

Population (2006)
  - Total: 31
- Time zone: UTC+3:30 (IRST)
  - Summer (DST): UTC+4:30 (IRDT)

Kalleh Jub-e Hajj Ali (Persian: كله جوب حاج علي, also Romanized as Kalleh Jūb-e Hājj ʿAlī; also known as Kaleh Jūb and Kalleh Jūb-e Chaghalvandī) is a village in Beyranvand-e Jonubi Rural District, Bayravand District, Khorramabad County, Lorestan Province, Iran. At the 2006 census, its population was 31, in 7 families.
