= Maidan, Nepal =

Maidan, Nepal मैदान
- Village development committee
- Location in Lumbini Province Maidan, Nepal (Nepal)
- Coordinates: 27.86°N 83.24°E
- Country: Nepal
- Zone: Lumbini Zone
- District: Arghakhanchi District

Population (1991)
  - Total: 4,474
  - Religions: Hindu
- Time zone: UTC+5:45 (Nepal Time)

Maidan is a village development committee in Arghakhanchi District in the Lumbini Zone of southern Nepal. At the time of the 1991 Nepal census it had a population of 4,474 and had 792 houses in the village.
