= Darabi (surname) =

Darabi is a surname. Notable people with the surname include:

- Delara Darabi (1986–2009), Iranian executed for murder
- Homa Darabi (1940–1994), Iranian suicide
- Moslem Darabi (born 1981), Iranian strongman
- Parvin Darabi (born 1941), American activist
