= Kalateh-ye Meydan =

Kalateh-ye Meydan كلاته ميدان
- Village
- Location within Iran
- Coordinates: 36°43′35″N 58°26′39″E
- Country: Iran
- Province: Razavi Khorasan
- County: Nishapur
- Bakhsh: Sarvelayat
- Rural District: Sarvelayat

Population (2006)
  - Total: 396
- Time zone: UTC+3:30 (IRST)
  - Summer (DST): UTC+4:30 (IRDT)

Kalateh-ye Meydan (Persian: كلاته ميدان, also Romanized as Kalāteh-ye Meydān and Kalāteh Meydān) is a village in Sarvelayat Rural District, Sarvelayat District, Nishapur County, Razavi Khorasan Province, Iran. At the 2006 census, its population was 396, in 117 families.
