= Darabi, Kurdistan =

Darabi دارابی
- Village
- Location within Iran
- Coordinates: 36°10′59″N 45°59′09″E
- Country: Iran
- Province: Kurdistan
- County: Saqqez
- Bakhsh: Central
- Rural District: Mir Deh

Population (2006)
  - Total: 91
- Time zone: UTC+3:30 (IRST)
  - Summer (DST): UTC+4:30 (IRDT)

Darabi (Persian: دارابی, also Romanized as Dārābī) is a village in Mir Deh Rural District, in the Central District of Saqqez County, Kurdistan Province, Iran. At the 2006 census, its population was 91, in 17 families. The village is populated by Kurds.
