= Cheshmeh Murineh, Lorestan =

Cheshmeh Murineh چشمه مورينه
- Village
- Location within Iran
- Coordinates: 33°59′09″N 47°52′57″E
- Country: Iran
- Province: Lorestan
- County: Delfan
- Bakhsh: Central
- Rural District: Nurabad

Population (2006)
  - Total: 72
- Time zone: UTC+3:30 (IRST)
  - Summer (DST): UTC+4:30 (IRDT)

Cheshmeh Murineh (Persian: چشمه مورينه, also Romanized as Cheshmeh Mūrīneh) is a village in Nurabad Rural District, in the Central District of Delfan County, Lorestan Province, Iran. At the 2006 census, its population was 72, in 15 families.
