= Qaleh-ye Meydan, Khuzestan =

Coordinates: 32.4729°N 49.1600°E

Qaleh-ye Meydan قلعه ميدان
- Village
- Interactive map of Qaleh-ye Meydan
- Country: Iran
- Province: Khuzestan
- County: Lali
- Bakhsh: Hati
- Rural District: Hati

Population (2006)
  - Total: 421
- Time zone: UTC+3:30 (IRST)
  - Summer (DST): UTC+4:30 (IRDT)

Qaleh-ye Meydan (Persian: قلعه ميدان, also Romanized as Qal‘eh-ye Meydān) is a village in Hati Rural District, Hati District, Lali County, Khuzestan Province, Iran. At the 2006 census, its population was 421, in 80 families.
