= Cheshmeh Pahn Ganjegan =

Cheshmeh Pahn Ganjegan چشمه پهن گنجگان
- Village
- Location within Iran
- Coordinates: 30°26′06″N 51°44′49″E
- Country: Iran
- Province: Kohgiluyeh and Boyer-Ahmad
- County: Boyer-Ahmad
- Bakhsh: Central
- Rural District: Sarrud-e Jonubi

Population (2006)
  - Total: 100
- Time zone: UTC+3:30 (IRST)
  - Summer (DST): UTC+4:30 (IRDT)

Cheshmeh Pahn Ganjegan (Persian: چشمه پهن گنجگان, also Romanized as Cheshmeh Pahn Ganjegān; also known as Cheshmeh Pahn) is a village in Sarrud-e Jonubi Rural District, in the Central District of Boyer-Ahmad County, Kohgiluyeh and Boyer-Ahmad Province, Iran. At the 2006 census, its population was 100, in 23 families.
