= Taiyafeh-ye Babakhan =

Taiyafeh-ye Babakhan طايفه باباخان
- Village
- Country: Iran
- Province: Kermanshah
- County: Eslamabad-e Gharb
- Bakhsh: Central
- Rural District: Howmeh-ye Jonubi

Population (2006)
  - Total: 30
- Time zone: UTC+3:30 (IRST)
  - Summer (DST): UTC+4:30 (IRDT)

Taiyafeh-ye Babakhan (Persian: طايفه باباخان, also Romanized as Ţāīyafeh-ye Bābākhān) is a village in Howmeh-ye Jonubi Rural District, in the Central District of Eslamabad-e Gharb County, Kermanshah Province, Iran. At the 2006 census, its population was 30, in 7 families.
