= Meydan, Fars =

Meydan ميدان
- Village
- Location within Iran
- Coordinates: 30°15′44″N 51°39′16″E
- Country: Iran
- Province: Fars
- County: Mamasani
- Bakhsh: Central
- Rural District: Jowzar

Population (2006)
  - Total: 186
- Time zone: UTC+3:30 (IRST)
  - Summer (DST): UTC+4:30 (IRDT)

Meydan (Persian: ميدان, also Romanized as Meydān) is a village in Jowzar Rural District, in the Central District of Mamasani County, Fars province, Iran. At the 2006 census, its population was 186, in 47 families.
