= Tak Meydan =

Tak Meydan تك ميدان
- Village
- Location within Iran
- Coordinates: 34°08′30″N 58°29′33″E
- Country: Iran
- Province: Razavi Khorasan
- County: Gonabad
- Bakhsh: Kakhk
- Rural District: Kakhk

Population (2006)
  - Total: 24
- Time zone: UTC+3:30 (IRST)
  - Summer (DST): UTC+4:30 (IRDT)

Tak Meydan (Persian: تك ميدان, also Romanized as Tak Meydān; also known as Tak Meydūn) is a village in Kakhk Rural District, Kakhk District, Gonabad County, Razavi Khorasan Province, Iran. At the 2006 census, its population was 24, in 9 families.
