= Darab, Ilam =

Darab داراب
- Village
- Location within Iran
- Coordinates: 33°48′40″N 46°19′31″E
- Country: Iran
- Province: Ilam
- County: Eyvan
- Bakhsh: Central
- Rural District: Sarab

Population (2006)
  - Total: 150
- Time zone: UTC+3:30 (IRST)
  - Summer (DST): UTC+4:30 (IRDT)

Darab (Persian: داراب, also Romanized as Dārāb) is a village in Sarab Rural District, in the Central District of Eyvan County, Ilam Province, Iran. At the 2006 census, its population was 150, in 31 families. The village is populated by Kurds.
