= Kalleh Jub, Kermanshah =

Kalleh Jub كله جوب
- Village
- Location within Iran
- Coordinates: 34°04′55″N 47°10′46″E
- Country: Iran
- Province: Kermanshah
- County: Kermanshah
- Bakhsh: Firuzabad
- Rural District: Sar Firuzabad

Population (2006)
  - Total: 385
- Time zone: UTC+3:30 (IRST)
  - Summer (DST): UTC+4:30 (IRDT)

Kalleh Jub (Persian: كله جوب, also Romanized as Kalleh Jūb; also known as Kalahjū) is a village in Sar Firuzabad Rural District, Firuzabad District, Kermanshah County, Kermanshah Province, Iran. At the 2006 census, its population was 385, in 80 families.
