= Cheshmeh Pahn-e Dasht Rum =

Cheshmeh Pahn-e Dasht Rum چشمه پهن دشت روم
- Village
- Location within Iran
- Coordinates: 30°31′39″N 51°32′52″E
- Country: Iran
- Province: Kohgiluyeh and Boyer-Ahmad
- County: Boyer-Ahmad
- Bakhsh: Central
- Rural District: Dasht-e Rum

Population (2006)
  - Total: 152
- Time zone: UTC+3:30 (IRST)
  - Summer (DST): UTC+4:30 (IRDT)

Cheshmeh Pahn-e Dasht Rum (Persian: چشمه پهن دشت روم, also Romanized as Cheshmeh Pahn-e Dasht Rūm; also known as Cheshmeh Pahn-e Jahānābād) is a village in Dasht-e Rum Rural District, in the Central District of Boyer-Ahmad County, Kohgiluyeh and Boyer-Ahmad Province, Iran. At the 2006 census, its population was 152, in 32 families.
