= Taiyafeh-ye Seyfollah =

Taiyafeh-ye Seyfollah طايفه سيف اله
- Village
- Country: Iran
- Province: Kermanshah
- County: Eslamabad-e Gharb
- Bakhsh: Central
- Rural District: Howmeh-ye Jonubi

Population (2006)
  - Total: 91
- Time zone: UTC+3:30 (IRST)
  - Summer (DST): UTC+4:30 (IRDT)

Taiyafeh-ye Seyfollah (Persian: طايفه سيف اله, also Romanized as Ţāīyafeh-ye Seyfollah) is a village in Howmeh-ye Jonubi Rural District, in the Central District of Eslamabad-e Gharb County, Kermanshah Province, Iran. At the 2006 census, its population was 91, in 24 families.
