= Kolahjub, Sirvan =

Kolahjub كله جوب
- Village
- Location within Iran
- Coordinates: 33°42′41″N 46°33′03″E
- Country: Iran
- Province: Ilam
- County: Sirvan
- Bakhsh: Karezan
- Rural District: Karezan

Population (2006)
  - Total: 183
- Time zone: UTC+3:30 (IRST)
  - Summer (DST): UTC+4:30 (IRDT)

Kolahjub (Persian: كله جوب, also Romanized as Kolahjūb and Kolah Jūb) is a village in Karezan Rural District, Karezan District, Sirvan County, Ilam Province, Iran. At the 2006 census, its population was 183, in 39 families. The village is populated by Kurds.
