= Abd ol Azizabad =

Abd ol Azizabad عبدل عزيزاباد
- Village
- Location within Iran
- Coordinates: 28°39′48″N 60°24′18″E
- Country: Iran
- Province: Sistan and Baluchestan
- County: Khash
- Bakhsh: Nukabad
- Rural District: Gowhar Kuh

Population (2006)
  - Total: 144
- Time zone: UTC+3:30 (IRST)
  - Summer (DST): UTC+4:30 (IRDT)

Abd ol Azizabad (Persian: عبدل عزيزاباد, also Romanized as ʿAbd ol ʿAzīzābād; also known as ‘Abd ol ‘Azīz) is a village in Gowhar Kuh Rural District, Nukabad District, Khash County, Sistan and Baluchestan Province, Iran. At the 2006 census, its population was 144, in 32 families.
