= Taiyafeh-ye Ali Jan =

Taiyafeh-ye Ali Jan طايفه علي جان
- Village
- Country: Iran
- Province: Kermanshah
- County: Eslamabad-e Gharb
- Bakhsh: Central
- Rural District: Howmeh-ye Jonubi

Population (2006)
  - Total: 14
- Time zone: UTC+3:30 (IRST)
  - Summer (DST): UTC+4:30 (IRDT)

Taiyafeh-ye Ali Jan (Persian: طايفه علي جان, also Romanized as Ţāīyafeh-ye ʿAlī Jān) is a village in Howmeh-ye Jonubi Rural District, in the Central District of Eslamabad-e Gharb County, Kermanshah Province, Iran. At the 2006 census, its population was 14, in 4 families.
