= Darab, West Azerbaijan =

Darab داراب
- village
- Location within Iran
- Coordinates: 38°01′26″N 44°33′43″E
- Country: Iran
- Province: West Azerbaijan
- County: Salmas
- Bakhsh: Kuhsar
- Rural District: Chahriq

Population (2006)
  - Total: 243
- Time zone: UTC+3:30 (IRST)
  - Summer (DST): UTC+4:30 (IRDT)

Darab (Persian: داراب, also romanized as Dārāb) is a village in Chahriq Rural District, Kuhsar District, Salmas County, West Azerbaijan Province, Iran. At the 2006 census, its population was 243 in 39 families.
