= Meydan, Dorud =

Meydan ميدان
- Village
- Location within Iran
- Coordinates: 33°40′58″N 48°50′22″E
- Country: Iran
- Province: Lorestan
- County: Dorud
- Bakhsh: Silakhor
- Rural District: Chalanchulan

Population (2006)
  - Total: 421
- Time zone: UTC+3:30 (IRST)
  - Summer (DST): UTC+4:30 (IRDT)

Meydan (Persian: ميدان, also Romanized as Meydān) is a village in Chalanchulan Rural District, Silakhor District, Dorud County, Lorestan Province, Iran. At the 2006 census, its population was 421, in 112 families.
