= Darab, Zarand =

Darab دراب
- Village
- Location within Iran
- Coordinates: 30°50′39″N 56°46′19″E
- Country: Iran
- Province: Kerman
- County: Zarand
- Bakhsh: Central
- Rural District: Hotkan

Population (2006)
  - Total: 11
- Time zone: UTC+3:30 (IRST)
  - Summer (DST): UTC+4:30 (IRDT)

Darab (Persian: دراب, also Romanized as Darāb and Dar-e Āb) is a village in Hotkan Rural District, in the Central District of Zarand County, Kerman Province, Iran. At the 2006 census, its population was 11, in 5 families.
