= Meydan-e Tafalli =

Meydan-e Tafalli ميدان طفلي
- Village
- Location within Iran
- Coordinates: 34°42′19″N 46°13′13″E
- Country: Iran
- Province: Kermanshah
- County: Salas-e Babajani
- Bakhsh: Central
- Rural District: Dasht-e Hor

Population (2006)
  - Total: 119
- Time zone: UTC+3:30 (IRST)
  - Summer (DST): UTC+4:30 (IRDT)

Meydan-e Tafalli (Persian: ميدان طفلي, also Romanized as Meydān-e Tafallī; also known as Meydān Ţoflī) is a village in Dasht-e Hor Rural District, in the Central District of Salas-e Babajani County, Kermanshah Province, Iran. At the 2006 census, its population was 119, in 24 families.
