= Kaleh Jub, Eyvan =

Kaleh Jub كله جوب
- Village
- Location within Iran
- Coordinates: 33°52′25″N 46°14′35″E
- Country: Iran
- Province: Ilam
- County: Eyvan
- Bakhsh: Central
- Rural District: Nabovat

Population (2006)
  - Total: 703
- Time zone: UTC+3:30 (IRST)
  - Summer (DST): UTC+4:30 (IRDT)

Kaleh Jub (Persian: كله جوب, also Romanized as Kaleh Jūb and Koleh Jūb) is a village in Nabovat Rural District, in the Central District of Eyvan County, Ilam Province, Iran. At the 2006 census, its population was 703, in 158 families. The village is populated by Kurds.
