= Darab, Kermanshah =

DeraAb درآب
- village
- Location within Iran
- Coordinates: 34°39′10″N 47°09′19″E
- Country: Iran
- Province: Kermanshah
- County: Kermanshah
- Bakhsh: Central
- Rural District: Poshtdarband

Population (2006)
  - Total: 300
- Time zone: UTC+3:30 (IRST)
  - Summer (DST): UTC+4:30 (IRDT)
- Area code: 083

DeraAb (Persian: درآب, also Romanized as Darāb) is a village in Poshtdarband Rural District, in the Central District of Kermanshah County, Kermanshah Province, Iran. At the 2006 census, its population was 300, in 70 families.
