= Koleh Jub, Eslamabad-e Gharb =

Koleh Jub كله جوب
- Village
- Location within Iran
- Coordinates: 34°01′12″N 46°38′02″E
- Country: Iran
- Province: Kermanshah
- County: Eslamabad-e Gharb
- Bakhsh: Central
- Rural District: Howmeh-ye Jonubi

Population (2006)
  - Total: 796
- Time zone: UTC+3:30 (IRST)
  - Summer (DST): UTC+4:30 (IRDT)

Koleh Jub (Persian: كله جوب, also Romanized as Koleh Jūb and Kalah Jūb; also known as Goleh Jūb, Kaleh Jūb-e ‘Olyā, and Kulajūb) is a village in Howmeh-ye Jonubi Rural District, in the Central District of Eslamabad-e Gharb County, Kermanshah Province, Iran. At the 2006 census, its population was 796, in 192 families.
