= Viche Maidan, Ivano-Frankivsk =

City square in Ivano-Frankivsk, Ukraine

Coordinates: 50°27′00″N 30°31′27″E

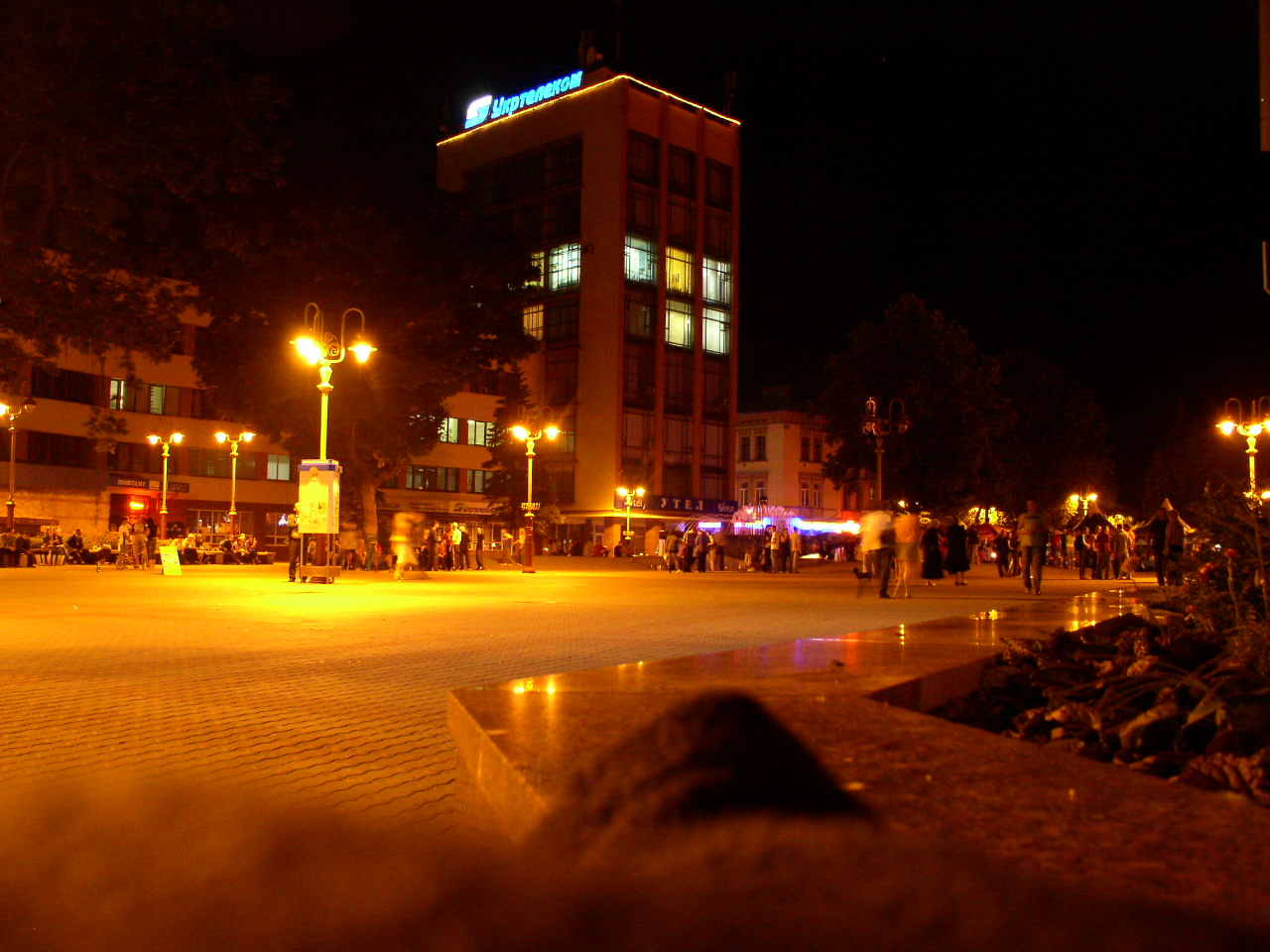
Main area, view south-west from the eastern portion of Maidan (2006)

Viche Maidan (Ukrainian: Вічевий майдан) is a city square located in the center of Ivano-Frankivsk.

== Composition ==
The square stretches from Halytska Street to Vitovsky Street. Vitovsky street connects the Viche Maidan with another city square - the Mickiewicz Square. Viche Maidan is a crossroad of many streets - Bachynsky Street, Belvederska Street, and the Nezalezhnist street. The first part of Nezalezhnist street is called stometrivka (Ukrainian: Стометрівка), which means "100-hundred-meters-street". It is surrounded by numerous buildings such as the main post office, the Ukrtelecom building, the Passage of Gartenbergs, the business center "Kyiv", and many others. The square has couple of fountains, flowerbeds, and a small park.

== History ==
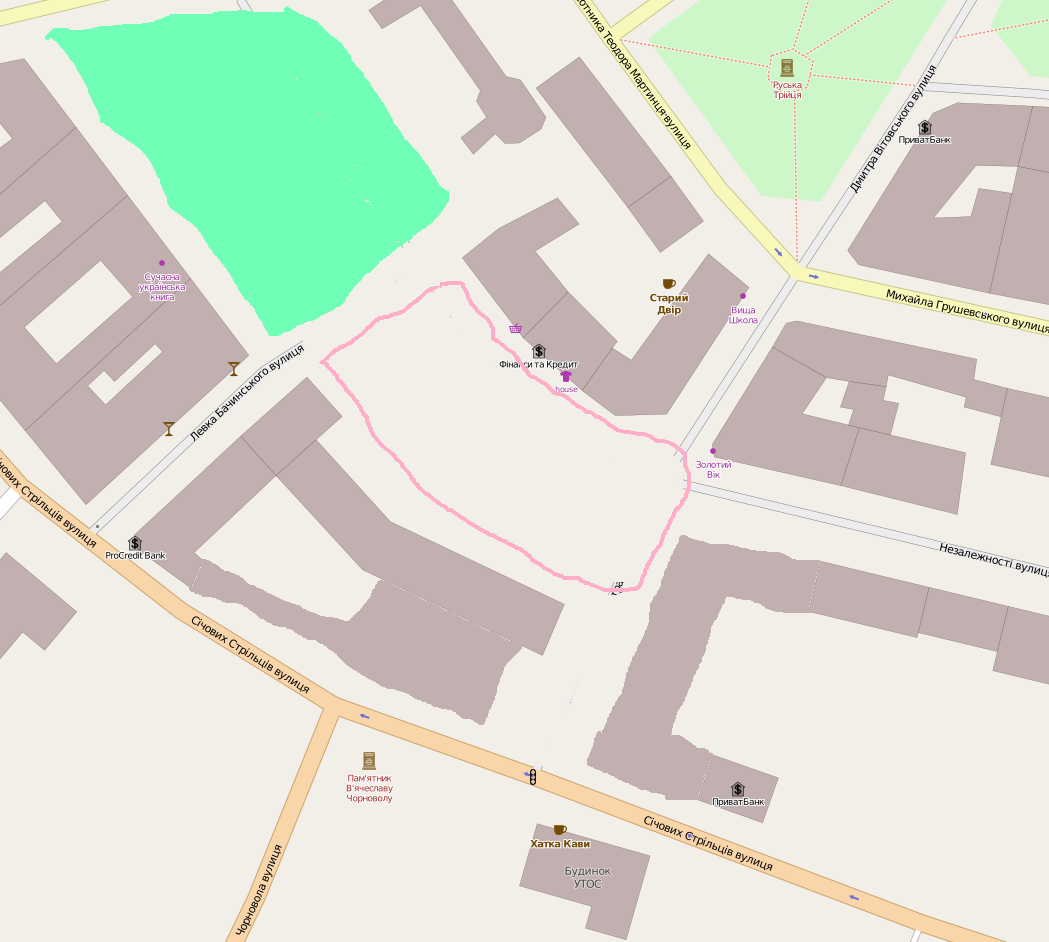
Council Square (Vichevyi Maidan), the pink zone. The whole area is pedestrian.

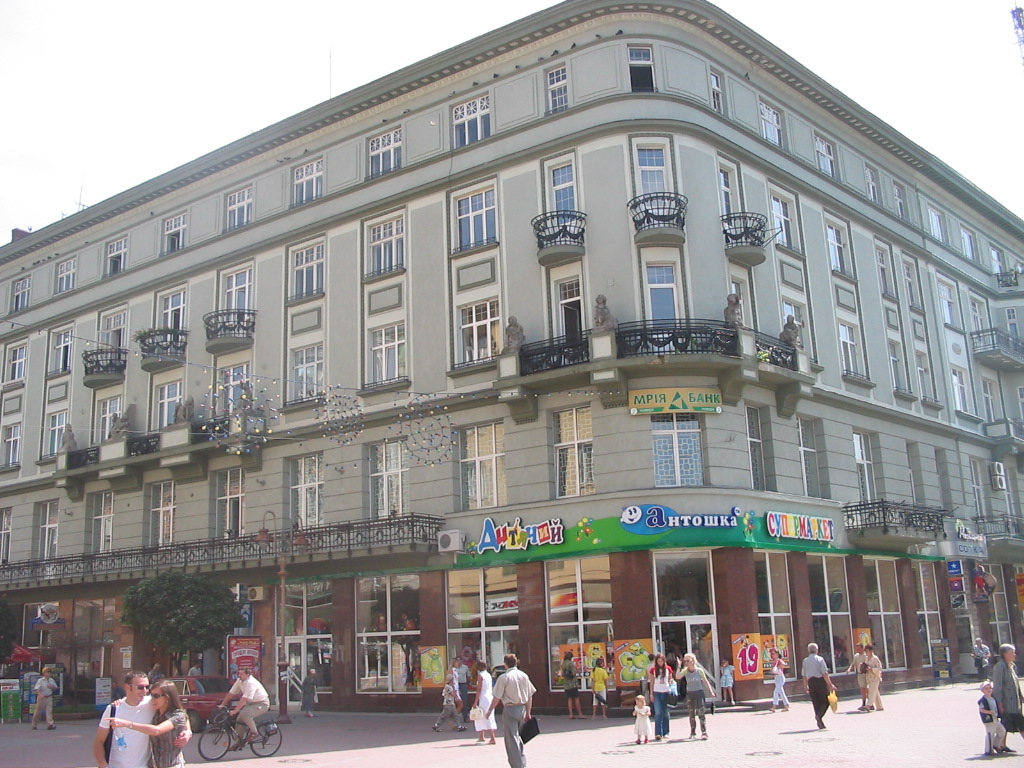
Business-center "Kyiv" on Maidan, 2004

The square started out from a city park that was created on an initiative of the local district starosta Francisco Kratter in 1825. He on behalf of the city bought the adjacent land owned by the Agopsowicz brothers in the vicinity of today's Sichovi Striltsi and Mazepa streets which were called respectively Sobieska and Kazimirowska. The land was implanted with numerous trees, flowerbeds, and park benches. In 1827 in its place a city park was opened, locally proclaimed as Kratterowka. The residents gathered there for rest and recreations. It was the first public city park. However, by the end of the century Kratterivka lost its charm as the new park "Dąbrowa" opened not far from it (today - Shevchenko park).

Later in the second half of 19th century Kratterowka was recognized as the city's square. The northern portion of it was named after Franz Joseph I, while its southern portion carried the name of Princess Gisela. After the 1920s during the Polish administration the both squares changed their names to Józef Piłsudski and General Haller, respectively. During the Soviet times the two squares were eventually united and called the Radyanska (Soviet) Square.

In 1904, the Gartenberg's Passage was built next to the park, and this building was preserved to our days. In 1960s, the Passage was rebuilt into a general department store, and later it became a department store for children. In 1990s, the building was renovated into an exhibition hall, that was later renamed to shopping mall "Malva". And in the 2010s, Passage Gartenberg was rebuilt as a restaurant.

The Viche Maidan is a popular spot for political protests, music concerts, or big holidays celebrations such as New Year and Christmas. At the New Year traditionally a big, oversize pine (New Year tree) gets placed in the middle of the square. During Christmas, the Maidan gets filled with people participating in a vertep parade. The name of the square derives from the Old-Slavic word viche, meaning a public gathering. It was given after the fall of the Soviet regime.

== Statues and fountains ==
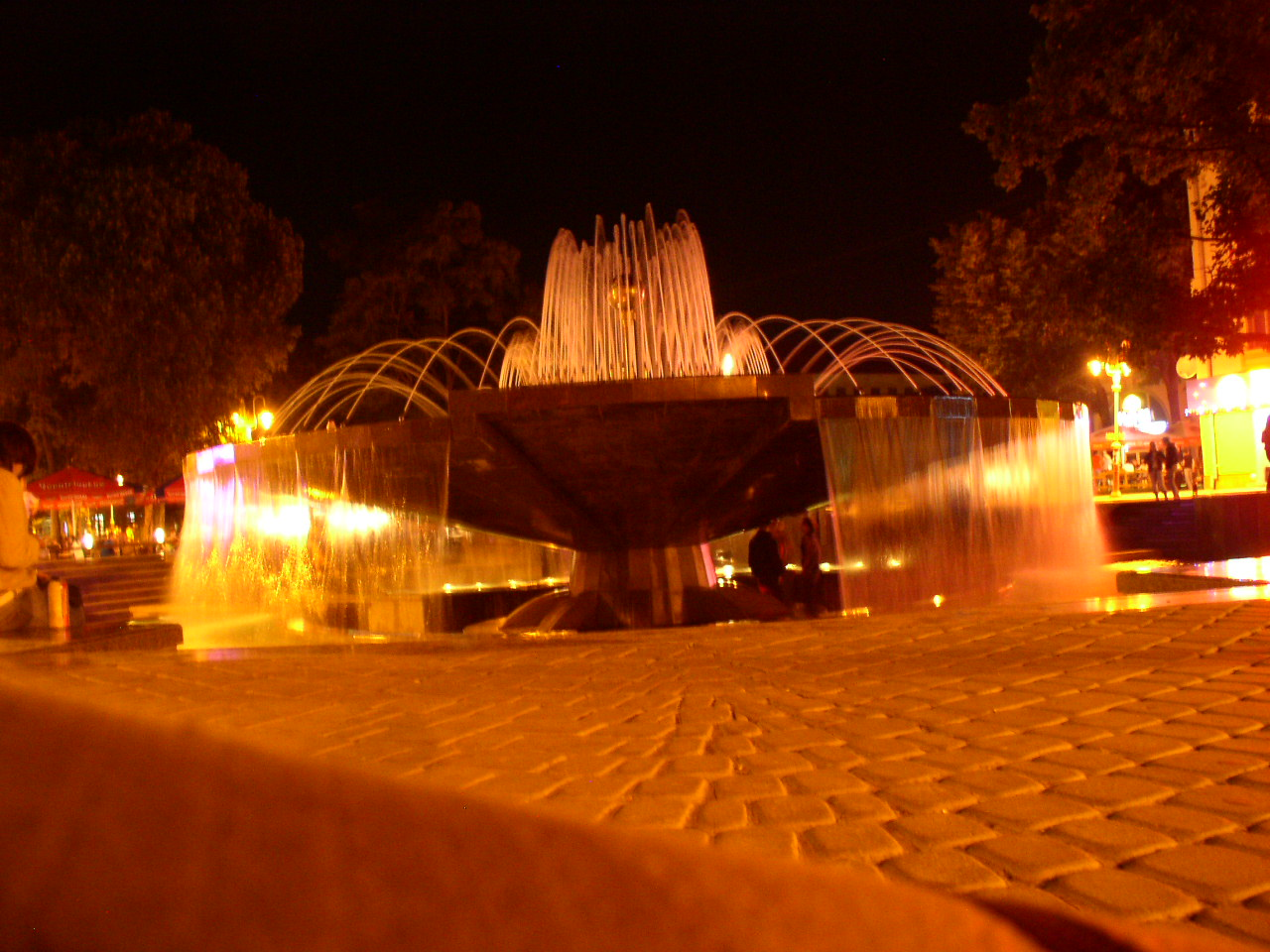
Fountain at Viche Maidan (2006)

== Bibliography ==
- Protsak, R. "By streets and squares of the city". "SIMYK". Ivano-Frankivsk, 2008. (page 13)
