= Vizhenan Rural District =

Rural district in Kermanshah province, Iran

Vizhenan Rural District Persian: دهستان ويژنان
- Rural District
- Location within Iran
- Coordinates: 33°56′51″N 45°49′04″E
- Country: Iran
- Province: Kermanshah
- County: Gilan-e Gharb
- District: Central
- Capital: Nian

Population (2016)
  - Total: 2,800
- Time zone: UTC+3:30 (IRST)

Vizhenan Rural District (Persian: دهستان ويژنان) is in the Central District of Gilan-e Gharb County, Kermanshah province, Iran. Its capital is the village of Nian.

== Demographics ==
=== Population ===
At the time of the 2006 National Census, the rural district's population was 2,515 in 540 households. There were 2,466 inhabitants in 597 households at the following census of 2011. The 2016 census measured the population of the rural district as 2,800 in 627 households. The most populous of its 42 villages was Qilan, with 339 people.
