= Direh Rural District =

Rural district in Kermanshah province, Iran

Direh Rural District Persian: دهستان ديره
- Rural District
- Location within Iran
- Coordinates: 34°18′36″N 45°54′40″E
- Country: Iran
- Province: Kermanshah
- County: Gilan-e Gharb
- District: Central

Population (2016)
  - Total: 3,600
- Time zone: UTC+3:30 (IRST)

Direh Rural District (Persian: دهستان ديره) is in the Central District of Gilan-e Gharb County, Kermanshah province, Iran.

== Demographics ==
=== Population ===
At the time of the 2006 National Census, the rural district's population was 4,530 in 974 households. There were 4,180 inhabitants in 1,041 households at the following census of 2011. The 2016 census measured the population of the rural district as 3,600 in 1,059 households. The most populous of its 30 villages was Nesar Direh, with 729 people.

== See also ==
Shahrak-e Jub Baghan, a village in the rural district
