= Cheleh Rural District =

Rural district in Kermanshah province, Iran

Cheleh Rural District Persian: دهستان چله
- Rural District
- Location within Iran
- Coordinates: 34°04′22″N 46°05′36″E
- Country: Iran
- Province: Kermanshah
- County: Gilan-e Gharb
- District: Central
- Capital: Qomra Ali

Population (2016)
  - Total: 6,361
- Time zone: UTC+3:30 (IRST)

Cheleh Rural District (Persian: دهستان چله) is in the Central District of Gilan-e Gharb County, Kermanshah province, Iran. Its capital is the village of Qomra Ali.

== Demographics ==
=== Population ===
At the time of the 2006 National Census, the rural district's population was 8,488 in 1,896 households. There were 9,745 inhabitants in 2,288 households at the following census of 2011. The 2016 census measured the population of the rural district as 6,361 in 1,904 households. The most populous of its 42 villages was Qomra Ali, with 538 people.
