= Howmeh Rural District (Gilan-e Gharb County) =

Rural district in Kermanshah province, Iran

Howmeh Rural District Persian: دهستان حومه
- Rural District
- Location within Iran
- Coordinates: 34°15′04″N 45°47′42″E
- Country: Iran
- Province: Kermanshah
- County: Gilan-e Gharb
- District: Central
- Capital: Gur-e Sefid

Population (2016)
  - Total: 5,030
- Time zone: UTC+3:30 (IRST)

Howmeh Rural District (Persian: دهستان حومه) is in the Central District of Gilan-e Gharb County, Kermanshah province, Iran. Its capital is the village of Gur-e Sefid.

== Demographics ==
=== Population ===
At the time of the 2006 National Census, the rural district's population was 6,684 in 1,429 households. There were 6,111 inhabitants in 1,533 households at the following census of 2011. The 2016 census measured the population of the rural district as 5,030 in 1,531 households. The most populous of its 56 villages was Gur-e Sefid, with 587 people.
