= Central District (Gilan-e Gharb County) =

District in Kermanshah province, Iran

Central District (Gilan-e Gharb County) Persian: بخش مرکزی شهرستان گیلان غرب
- District
- Location within Iran
- Coordinates: 34°03′22″N 45°57′21″E
- Country: Iran
- Province: Kermanshah
- County: Gilan-e Gharb
- Capital: Gilan-e Gharb

Population (2016)
  - Total: 40,122
- Time zone: UTC+3:30 (IRST)

The Central District of Gilan-e Gharb County (Persian: بخش مرکزی شهرستان گیلان غرب) is in Kermanshah province, Iran. Its capital is the city of Gilan-e Gharb.

== Demographics ==
=== Population ===
At the time of the 2006 National Census, the district's population was 41,648 in 9,459 households. The following census in 2011 counted 43,424 people in 10,963 households. The 2016 census measured the population of the district as 40,122 inhabitants in 11,783 households.

=== Administrative divisions ===
Central District (Gilan-e Gharb County) Population
Administrative Divisions	2006	2011	2016
Cheleh RD	8,488	9,745	6,361
Direh RD	4,530	4,180	3,600
Howmeh RD	6,684	6,111	5,030
Vizhenan RD	2,515	2,466	2,800
Gilan-e Gharb (city)	19,431	20,922	22,331
Total	41,648	43,424	40,122
RD = Rural District
