= Kalan =

Kalan may refer to:

- The sea otter, also called kalan, a large otter native to the North Pacific
- Kalan Müzik, Kalan Music, Istanbul, Turkish independent record label of ethnic and folk music

== People ==
- Elliott Kalan (born 1981), U.S. comedy writer and comedian
- Kalan Haywood (born 1999), American politician
- Kalan Porter (born 1985), or just "Kalan", singer, a winner of TV show Canadian Idol

== Places ==
- Kalan (Turkey), name until 1936 of the Dersim Province capital, now Tunceli
- Kalan (France), original Breton name of the Bretagne town of Calan, Morbihan
- Kalán, Hungarian name for the town of Călan, Hunedoara County, Romania
- Kalan, Ardabil, a village in Ardabil Province, Iran
- Kalan, Kaleybar, a village in East Azerbaijan Province, Iran
- Kalan, Varzaqan, a village in East Azerbaijan Province, Iran
- Kalan, Ilam, a village in Ilam Province, Iran
- Kalan, Lorestan, a village in Lorestan Province, Iran
- Kalan, Qazvin, a village in Qazvin Province, Iran
- Kollan, Dalgan, a village in Sistan and Baluchestan Province, Iran
- Kalan, Tehran, a village in Tehran Province, Iran
- Kalan Rural District, an administrative subdivision in Ilam Province, Iran
- Kalan, a tehsil of Shahjahanpur district, Uttar Pradesh, India
- Kalan, Mughal word used in India and Pakistan for "big", administrative suffix or prefix for places:
  - In Pakistan, such as Birote Kalan or Dholla Kalan
  - In India, such as Uppal Kalan or Kalan Wali

== See also ==
- Khurd (disambiguation), the opposite of the place name suffix kalan (big), meaning little
- Kaalan, an Indian dish
- Gerald Kallan (born 1979), Austrian luger
- Calan Mai, in Wales, name of 1 May, a holiday
- Calan Gaeaf, in Wales, name of 1 November, first day of winter
- Hyacinth Marie de Lalande de Calan (19th century), Governor General for French Indies
