= Band-e Sar =

Band-e Sar or Band Sar or Bandesar (Persian: بندسر) may refer to:

- Band Sar, Ilam
- Bandesar, Mazandaran
- Band-e Sar, Qazvin
- Band Sar, Chabahar, Sistan and Baluchestan Province
- Band Sar Chukat, Chabahar County, Sistan and Baluchestan Province
- Band Sar Molla Ahmad Bazar, Chabahar County, Sistan and Baluchestan Province
