= Vileh, Ilam =

Vileh ويله
- Village
- Location within Iran
- Coordinates: 34°00′15″N 46°02′50″E
- Country: Iran
- Province: Ilam
- County: Eyvan
- Bakhsh: Zarneh
- Rural District: Zarneh

Population (2006)
  - Total: 188
- Time zone: UTC+3:30 (IRST)
  - Summer (DST): UTC+4:30 (IRDT)
- Website: https://vileh.com/

Vileh (Persian: ويله, also Romanized as Vīlehand Veyleh) is a village in Zarneh Rural District, Zarneh District, Eyvan County, Ilam Province, Iran. At the 2006 census, its population was 188, in 36 families. The village is populated by Kurds.
