= Baskeleh-ye Garmeh =

Baskeleh-ye Garmeh باسكله گرمه
- Village
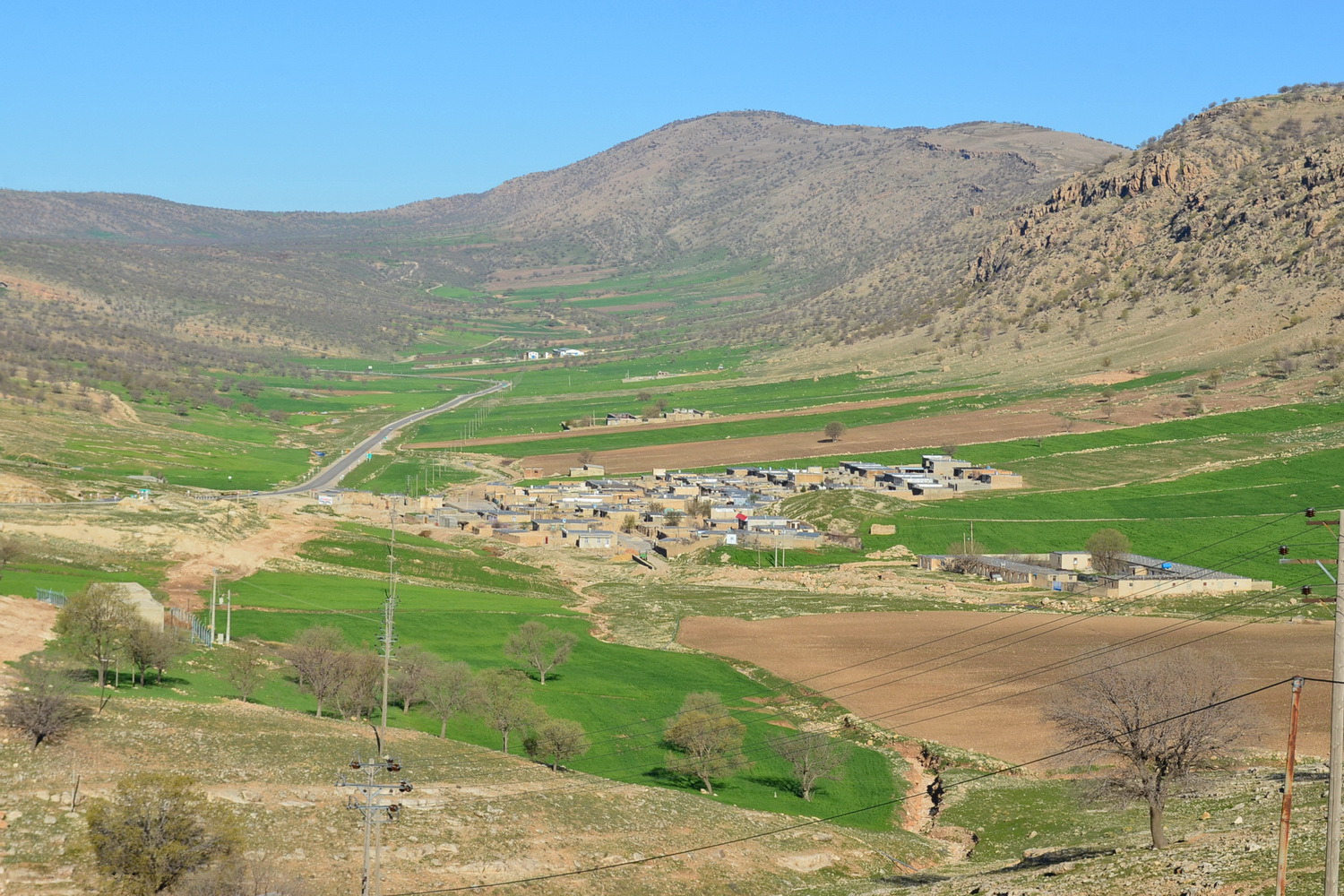

- Location within Iran
- Coordinates: 33°56′42″N 46°16′04″E
- Country: Iran
- Province: Ilam
- County: Eyvan
- Bakhsh: Zarneh
- Rural District: Zarneh

Population (2006)
  - Total: 341
- Time zone: UTC+3:30 (IRST)
  - Summer (DST): UTC+4:30 (IRDT)

Baskeleh-ye Garmeh (Persian: باسكله گرمه, also Romanized as Bāskeleh-ye Garmeh; also known as Bāskeleh Garmeh-ye Soflá) is a village in Zarneh Rural District, Zarneh District, Eyvan County, Ilam Province, Iran. At the 2006 census, its population was 341, in 62 families. The village is populated by Kurds.
