= Zarneh (disambiguation) =

Zarneh is a city in Ilam Province, Iran.

Zarneh (Persian: زرنه) may also refer to:

- Zarneh, Isfahan
- Zarneh, North Khorasan
- Zarneh District, in Ilam Province
- Zarneh Rural District, in Ilam Province
