= Nahrkhan-e Sofla =

Nahrkhan-e Sofla نهرخان سفلي
- Village
- Location within Iran
- Coordinates: 33°53′27″N 46°11′29″E
- Country: Iran
- Province: Ilam
- County: Eyvan
- Bakhsh: Zarneh
- Rural District: Kalan

Population (2006)
  - Total: 170
- Time zone: UTC+3:30 (IRST)
  - Summer (DST): UTC+4:30 (IRDT)

Nahrkhan-e Sofla (Persian: نهرخان سفلي, also Romanized as Nahrkhān-e Soflá) is a village in Kalan Rural District, Zarneh District, Eyvan County, Ilam Province, Iran. At the 2006 census, its population was 170, in 34 families. The village is populated by Kurds.
