= Taran, Ilam =

Village in Ilam province, Iran

Taran Persian: ترن
- Village
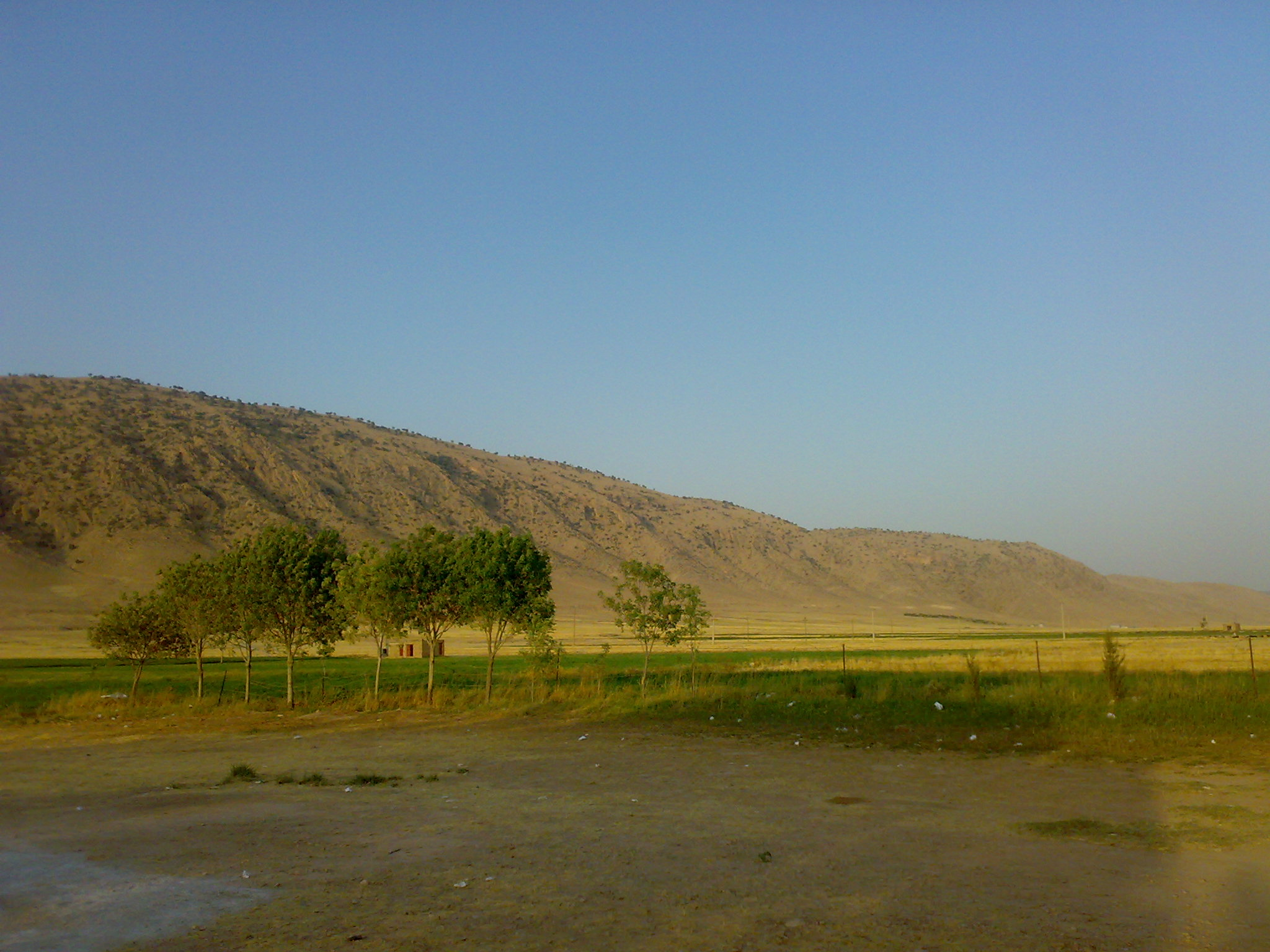
- طبیعت منطقه

- Location within Iran Location within Ilam Province
- Coordinates: 33°56′55″N 46°08′21″E
- Country: Iran
- Province: Ilam
- County: Eyvan
- District: Zarneh
- Rural District: Zarneh

Population (2016)
  - Total: 373
- Time zone: UTC+3:30 (IRST)

Taran (Persian: ترن) (Note: Also known as Kāni Tarn, Kānī-ye Tarn, Taran-e Nāderī, and Teran-e Nāderī) is a village in, and the capital of, Zarneh Rural District of Zarneh District, Eyvan County, Ilam province, Iran. The previous capital of the rural district was the village of Zarneh, now a city.

== Demographics ==
=== Ethnicity ===
The village is populated by Kurds.

=== Population ===
At the time of the 2006 National Census, the village's population was 420 in 83 households. The following census in 2011 counted 426 people in 96 households. The 2016 census measured the population of the village as 373 people in 95 households.
