= Nahrkhan =

Nahrkhan (Persian: نهرخان) may refer to:

- Nahrkhan-e Olya
- Nahrkhan-e Sofla
