= Gav Savar, Ilam =

Gav Savar گاوسوار
- Village
- Location within Iran
- Coordinates: 33°48′39″N 46°17′31″E
- Country: Iran
- Province: Ilam
- County: Eyvan
- Bakhsh: Central
- Rural District: Sarab

Population (2006)
  - Total: 308
- Time zone: UTC+3:30 (IRST)
  - Summer (DST): UTC+4:30 (IRDT)

Gav Savar (Persian: گاوسوار, also Romanized as Gāv Savār) is a village in Sarab Rural District, in the Central District of Eyvan County, Ilam Province, Iran. At the 2006 census, its population was 308, in 66 families. The village is populated by Kurds.
