= Chalanchi-ye Olya =

Village in Ilam, Iran

Chalanchi-ye Olya چالانچي عليا
- Village
- Location within Iran
- Coordinates: 33°48′21″N 46°19′40″E
- Country: Iran
- Province: Ilam
- County: Eyvan
- Bakhsh: Central
- Rural District: Sarab

Population (2006)
  - Total: 429
- Time zone: UTC+3:30 (IRST)
  - Summer (DST): UTC+4:30 (IRDT)

Chalanchi-ye Olya (Persian: چالانچي عليا, also Romanized as Chālānchī-ye ‘Olyā; also known as Chālānchī and Halāshī) is a village in Sarab Rural District, in the Central District of Eyvan County, Illam province, Iran. At the 2006 census, its population was 429, in 89 families. The village is populated by Kurds.
