= Jub Gowhar =

Jub Gowhar or Jubgowhar (Persian: جوب گوهر) may refer to:

- Jub Gowhar-e Olya
- Jub Gowhar-e Sofla
