= Gilaneh, Ilam =

Gilaneh گيلانه
- Village
- Location within Iran
- Coordinates: 33°52′40″N 46°04′37″E
- Country: Iran
- Province: Ilam
- County: Eyvan
- Bakhsh: Zarneh
- Rural District: Kalan

Population (2006)
  - Total: 26
- Time zone: UTC+3:30 (IRST)
  - Summer (DST): UTC+4:30 (IRDT)

Gilaneh (Persian: گيلانه, also Romanized as Gīlāneh) is a village in Kalan Rural District, Zarneh District, Eyvan County, Ilam Province, Iran. At the 2006 census, its population was 26, in 5 families. The village is populated by Kurds.
