= Nahrkhan-e Olya =

Nahrkhan-e Olya نهرخان عليا
- Village
- Location within Iran
- Coordinates: 33°52′57″N 46°12′05″E
- Country: Iran
- Province: Ilam
- County: Eyvan
- Bakhsh: Zarneh
- Rural District: Kalan

Population (2006)
  - Total: 421
- Time zone: UTC+3:30 (IRST)
  - Summer (DST): UTC+4:30 (IRDT)

Nahrkhan-e Olya (Persian: نهرخان عليا, also Romanized as Nahrkhān-e 'Olyā) is a village in Kalan Rural District, Zarneh District, Eyvan County, Ilam province, Iran. At the 2006 census, its population was 421, in 80 families. The village is populated by Kurds.
