= Kharabanan-e Sofla =

Kharabanan-e Sofla خرابانان سفلي
- Village
- Location within Iran
- Coordinates: 33°47′16″N 46°20′28″E
- Country: Iran
- Province: Ilam
- County: Eyvan
- Bakhsh: Central
- Rural District: Sarab

Population (2006)
  - Total: 58
- Time zone: UTC+3:30 (IRST)
  - Summer (DST): UTC+4:30 (IRDT)

Kharabanan-e Sofla (Persian: خرابانان سفلي, also Romanized as Kharābānān-e Soflá; also known as Kharābān and Kharābānān) is a village in Sarab Rural District, in the Central District of Eyvan County, Ilam Province, Iran. At the 2006 census, its population was 58, in 10 families. The village is populated by Kurds.
