= Kharabanan =

Kharabanan (Persian: خرابانان) may refer to:

- Kharabanan-e Olya
- Kharabanan-e Sofla
