= Do Biran-e Olya =

Do Biran-e Olya دوبيران عليا
- Village
- Location within Iran
- Coordinates: 33°50′13″N 46°18′26″E
- Country: Iran
- Province: Ilam
- County: Eyvan
- Bakhsh: Central
- Rural District: Sarab

Population (2006)
  - Total: 524
- Time zone: UTC+3:30 (IRST)
  - Summer (DST): UTC+4:30 (IRDT)

Do Biran-e Olya (Persian: دوبيران عليا, also Romanized as Do Bīrān-e ‘Olyā; also known as Dhuberān, Dobīrān, and Dow Vīrān) is a village in Sarab Rural District, in the Central District of Eyvan County, Ilam Province, Iran. At the 2006 census, its population was 524, in 116 families. The village is populated by Kurds.
