= Halashi =

Halashi may refer to:

- Halashi, Karnataka, a village in India
- Halashi, Iran, a city in Iran
- Halashi, Ilam, a village in Ilam Province, Iran
