= Kharabanan-e Olya =

Kharabanan-e Olya خرابانان عليا
- Village
- Location within Iran
- Coordinates: 33°46′43″N 46°20′59″E
- Country: Iran
- Province: Ilam
- County: Eyvan
- Bakhsh: Central
- Rural District: Sarab

Population (2006)
  - Total: 163
- Time zone: UTC+3:30 (IRST)
  - Summer (DST): UTC+4:30 (IRDT)

Kharabanan-e Olya (Persian: خرابانان عليا, also Romanized as Kharābānān-e ‘Olyā) is a village in Sarab Rural District, in the Central District of Eyvan County, Ilam Province, Iran. The village is populated by Kurds.

== Demographics ==
At the 2006 census, its population was 163, in 33 families.
