= Do Biran =

Do Biran or Dobiran (Persian: دوبيران), also spelled Dhuberan or Dow Viran, may refer to:

- Do Biran-e Olya
- Do Biran-e Sofla
