= Kapneh Karan, Iran =

Village in Ilam province, Iran

Kapneh Karan Persian: كپنه كران
- Village
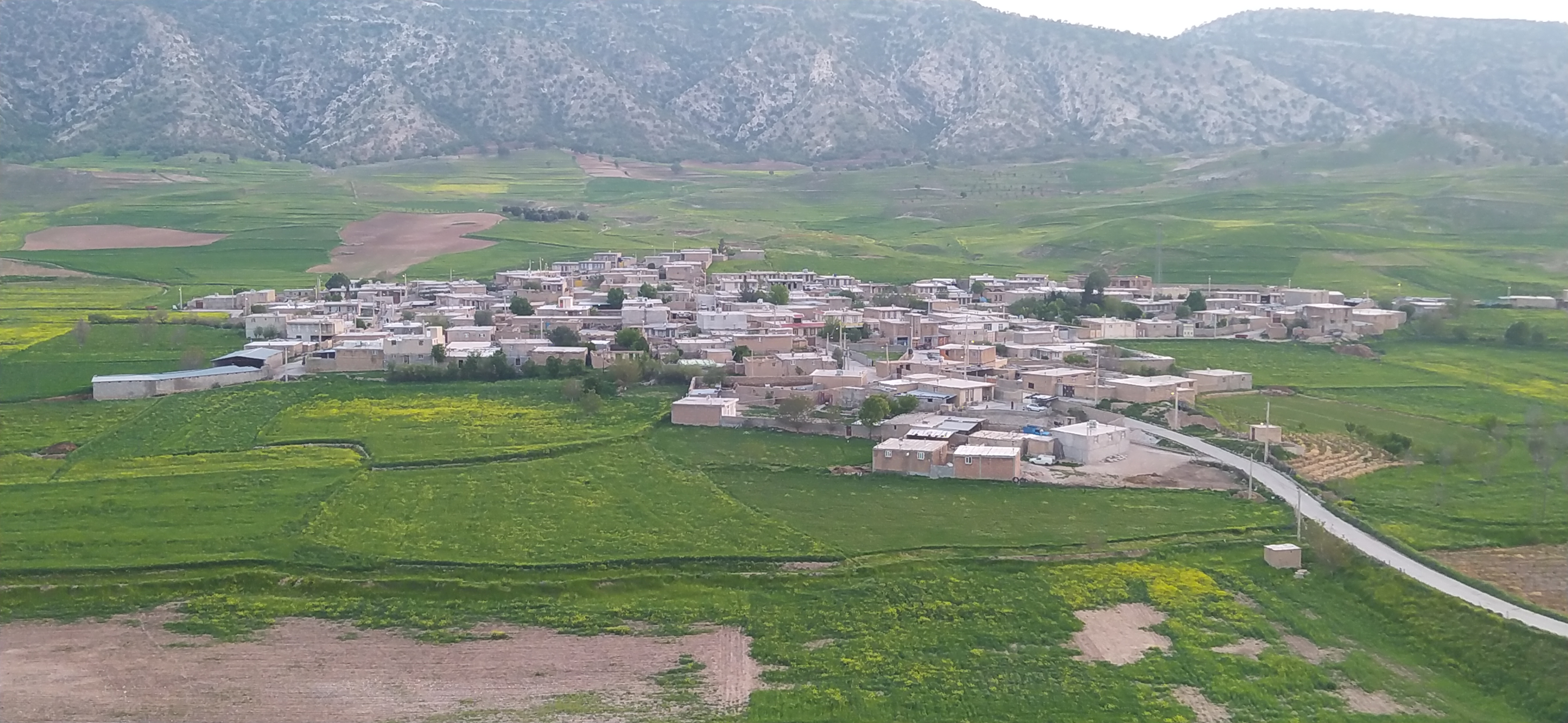
- The village of RostamKhan

- Location within Iran Location within Ilam Province
- Coordinates: 33°53′59″N 46°10′12″E
- Country: Iran
- Province: Ilam
- County: Eyvan
- District: Zarneh
- Rural District: Kalan
- Established: 1961

Area
  - Total: 0.1 km^{2} (0.039 sq mi)
- Elevation: 1,040 m (3,410 ft)

Population (2016)
  - Total: 558
  - Density: 5,600/km^{2} (14,000/sq mi)
- Time zone: UTC+03:30 (IRST)
- Geocode: 6236

Kapneh Karan (Persian: كپنه كران) is a village in Kalan Rural District of Zarneh District, Eyvan County, Ilam province, Iran.

== Demographics ==
=== Language and ethnicity ===
The village is populated by Kurds. The language of the people of this village is Kalhori Kurdish.

=== Population ===
At the time of the 2006 National Census, the village's population was 663 in 121 households. The following census in 2011 counted 625 people in 137 households. The 2016 census measured the population of the village as 558 people in 138 households. It was the most populous village in its rural district.
