= Gilaneh =

Gilaneh (Persian: گيلانه) may refer to:

- Gilaneh, Ilam
- Gilaneh, Kermanshah
- Gilaneh, Kurdistan
- Gilaneh (film)
