= Hesar-e Shaveh =

Hesar-e Shaveh حصارشاوه
- Village
- Location within Iran
- Coordinates: 33°51′22″N 46°14′33″E
- Country: Iran
- Province: Ilam
- County: Eyvan
- Bakhsh: Central
- Rural District: Nabovat

Population (2006)
  - Total: 131
- Time zone: UTC+3:30 (IRST)
  - Summer (DST): UTC+4:30 (IRDT)

Hesar-e Shaveh (Persian: حصارشاوه, also Romanized as Ḩeşār-e Shāveh and Ḩeşār Shāveh) is a village in Nabovat Rural District, in the Central District of Eyvan County, Ilam Province, Iran. At the 2006 census, its population was 131, in 25 families. The village is populated by Kurds.
