= Jub Gowhar-e Olya =

Village in Ilam, Iran

Jub Gowhar-e Olya جوب گوهرعليا
- Village
- Location within Iran
- Coordinates: 33°51′55″N 46°13′59″E
- Country: Iran
- Province: Ilam
- County: Eyvan
- Bakhsh: Central
- Rural District: Nabovat

Population (2006)
  - Total: 320
- Time zone: UTC+3:30 (IRST)
  - Summer (DST): UTC+4:30 (IRDT)

Jub Gowhar-e Olya (Persian: جوب گوهرعليا, also Romanized as Jūb Gowhar-e ‘Olyā and Jūbgowhar-e ‘Olyā) is a village in Nabovat Rural District, in the Central District of Eyvan County, Ilam Province, Iran. At the 2006 census, its population was 320, in 65 families. The village is populated by Kurds.
