= Taq-e Shirin and Farhad =

Ancient rock relief in Iran

Taq-e Shirin and Farhad (Persian: طاق شیرین و فرهاد, lit. 'Arch of Shirin and Farhad') is a rock relief from the Sasanian era (224–651 CE) located on the way from Zarneh in Ilam province to Sumar in Kermanshah province of Iran, 7 kilometers from Chel Zarie village near Kooshk Pass in Eyvan County.

The relief is attributed to the lovers Shirin and Farhad during the reign of the Sasanian king Khosrow II (r. 590–628 CE). It was discovered in the year 2000.

== See also ==
- Taq-e Bostan
- Taq Kasra
- Taq-e Gara
- Sumar District
- Kalhor
