= Chahar Meleh =

Village in Ilam province, Iran

Chahar Meleh Persian: چهارمله
- Village
- Location within Iran Location within Ilam Province
- Coordinates: 33°56′26″N 46°17′22″E
- Country: Iran
- Province: Ilam
- County: Eyvan
- District: Zarneh
- Rural District: Zarneh

Population (2016)
  - Total: 772
- Time zone: UTC+3:30 (IRST)

Chahar Meleh (Persian: چهارمله) (Note: Also romanized as Chahār Meleh) is a village in Zarneh Rural District of Zarneh District, Eyvan County, Ilam province, Iran.

== Demographics ==
=== Ethnicity ===
The village is populated by Kurds.

=== Population ===
At the time of the 2006 National Census, the village's population was 802 in 174 households. The following census in 2011 counted 839 people in 198 households. The 2016 census measured the population of the village as 772 people in 208 households. It was the most populous village in its rural district.
