= Guria Castle =

Castle in Ilam Province, Iran

Guria castle
- قلعه گوریا

General information
- Type: Castle
- Location: Eyvan County, Iran

Guria castle (Persian: قلعه گوریا) is a historical castle located in Eyvan County in Ilam Province, The longevity of this fortress dates back to the Sasanian Empire.
