= Khurd (disambiguation) =

Khurd may refer to:

- Khurd an administrative placename description meaning small used in North India and Pakistan
- Khurd, Sultanpur Lodhi, village in Punjab, India
- Hurd, a Mongolian heavy metal band

== See also ==
- Kalan (disambiguation), the opposite place name suffix, meaning big
