= Aiwan =

Aiwan may refer to:

- Eyvan, a city in Iran
- Shalimar Gardens (Lahore), Pakistan
