= Sarab, Ilam =

Village in Ilam province, Iran

Sarab Persian: سراب
- Village
- Location within Iran Location within Ilam Province
- Coordinates: 33°45′17″N 46°21′53″E
- Country: Iran
- Province: Ilam
- County: Eyvan
- District: Central
- Rural District: Sarab

Population (2016)
  - Total: 1,413
- Time zone: UTC+3:30 (IRST)

Sarab (Persian: سراب) (Note: Also romanized as Sarāb; also known as Dowlatābād, Sār Sarāb, and Sarāb-e Eyvān) is a village in, and the capital of, Sarab Rural District of the Central District of Eyvan County, Ilam province, Iran.

== Demographics ==
=== Ethnicity ===
The village is populated by Kurds.

=== Population ===
At the time of the 2006 National Census, the village's population was 1,522 in 349 households. The following census in 2011 counted 1,506 people in 398 households. The 2016 census measured the population of the village as 1,413 people in 415 households. It was the most populous village in its rural district.
