= Jub Gowhar-e Sofla =

Jub Gowhar-e Sofla جوب گوهرسفلي
- Village
- Location within Iran
- Coordinates: 33°52′17″N 46°13′10″E
- Country: Iran
- Province: Ilam
- County: Eyvan
- Bakhsh: Central
- Rural District: Nabovat

Population (2006)
  - Total: 78
- Time zone: UTC+3:30 (IRST)
  - Summer (DST): UTC+4:30 (IRDT)

Jub Gowhar-e Sofla (Persian: جوب گوهرسفلي, also Romanized as Jūb Gowhar-e Soflá and Jūbgowhar-e Soflá; also known as Deh-e Jān ‘Alī and Jūb Gabar) is a village in Nabovat Rural District, in the Central District of Eyvan County, Ilam Province, Iran. At the 2006 census, its population was 78, in 14 families. The village is populated by Kurds.
