= Do Biran-e Sofla =

Do Biran-e Sofla دوبيران سفلي
- Village
- Location within Iran
- Coordinates: 33°50′33″N 46°17′57″E
- Country: Iran
- Province: Ilam
- County: Eyvan
- Bakhsh: Central
- Rural District: Sarab

Population (2006)
  - Total: 282
- Time zone: UTC+3:30 (IRST)
  - Summer (DST): UTC+4:30 (IRDT)

Do Biran-e Sofla (Persian: دوبيران سفلي, also Romanized as Do Bīrān-e Soflá; also known as Band Sar) is a village in Sarab Rural District, in the Central District of Eyvan County, Ilam Province, Iran. At the 2006 census, its population was 282, in 54 families. The village is populated by Kurds.
