= Gav Savar =

Gav Savar (Persian: گاوسوار) may refer to:

- Gav Savar, Hamadan
- Gav Savar, Ilam
