= Shahrak-e Nabovat =

Village in Ilam province, Iran

Shahrak-e Nabovat Persian: شهرك نبوت
- Village
- Location within Iran Location within Ilam Province
- Coordinates: 33°51′17″N 46°16′16″E
- Country: Iran
- Province: Ilam
- County: Eyvan
- District: Central
- Rural District: Nabovat

Population (2016)
  - Total: 1,509
- Time zone: UTC+3:30 (IRST)

Sharak-e Nabovat (Persian: شهرك نبوت) (Note: Also romanized as Shahrak-e Nabovvat and Sharak-e Nobovvat) is a village in, and the capital of, Nabovat Rural District (Note: Formerly Sarab-e Eyvan Rural District) of the Central District of Eyvan County, Ilam province, Iran.

== Demographics ==
=== Ethnicity ===
The village is populated by Kurds.

=== Population ===
At the time of the 2006 National Census, the village's population was 1,413 in 283 households. The following census in 2011 counted 1,515 people in 355 households. The 2016 census measured the population of the village as 1,509 people in 433 households. It was the most populous village in its rural district.
