= Kalan, Ilam =

Village in Ilam province, Iran

Kalan Persian: كلان
- Village
- Location within Iran Location within Ilam Province
- Coordinates: 33°25′05″N 46°15′53″E
- Country: Iran
- Province: Ilam
- County: Eyvan
- District: Zarneh
- Rural District: Kalan

Population (2016)
  - Total: 532
- Time zone: UTC+3:30 (IRST)

Kalan (Persian: كلان) (Note: Also romanized as Kalān) is a village in, and the capital of, Kalan Rural District of Zarneh District, Eyvan County, Ilam province, Iran.

== Demographics ==
=== Ethnicity ===
The village is populated by Kurds.

=== Population ===
At the time of the 2006 National Census, the village's population was 536 in 108 households. The following census in 2011 counted 556 people in 135 households. The 2016 census measured the population of the village as 532 people in 150 households.
