= Taq-e Gara =

Ancient structure in Iran

Taq-e Gara طاق گرا
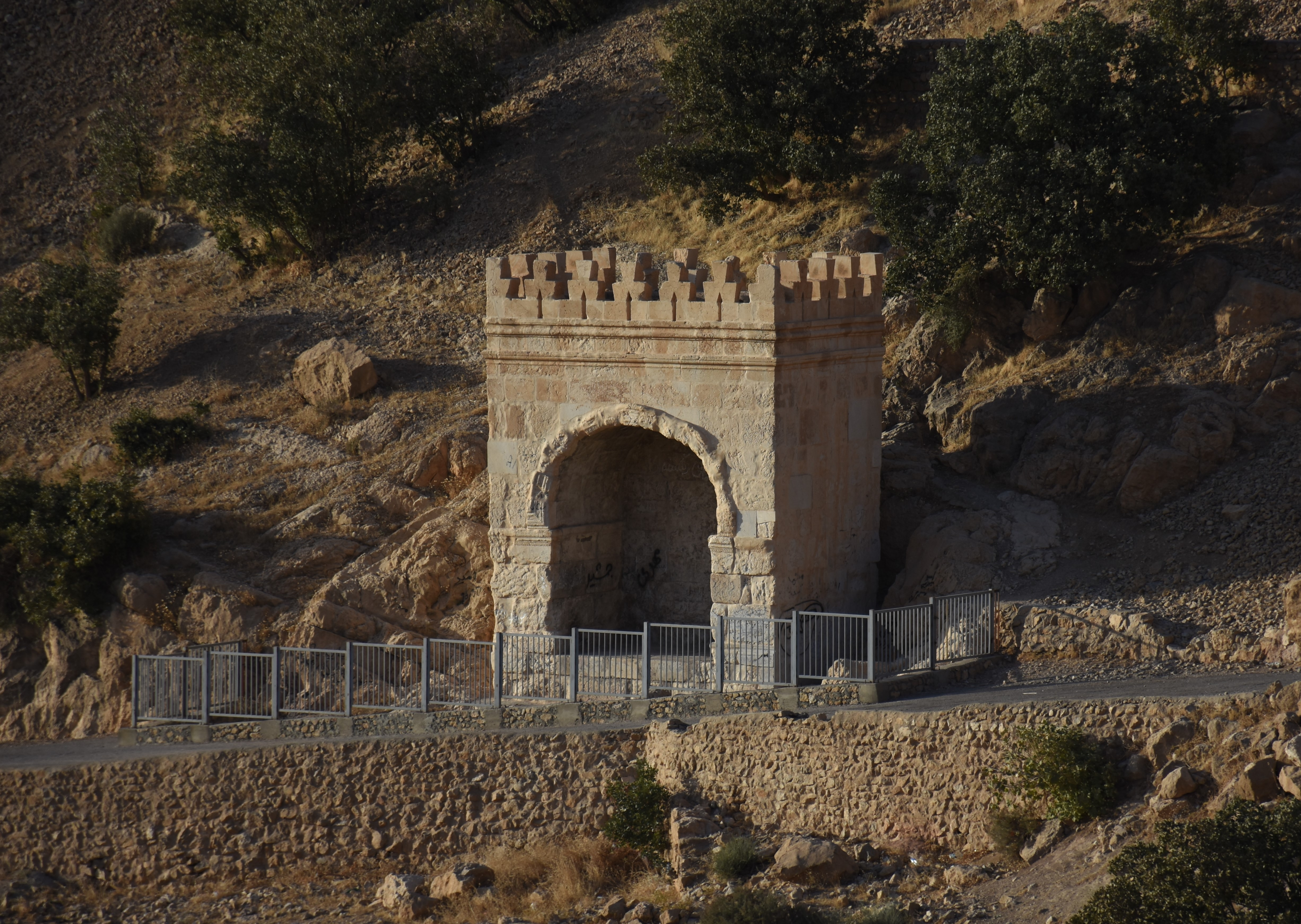
- Interactive map of Taq-e Gara طاق گرا
- 34.4318°N 46.0177°E
- Location: Patagh Pass, Sarpol-e Zahab, Kermanshah Province, Iran

Site notes
- Height: 11.7 m

Iran National Heritage List
- Official name: Taq-e Gara
- Type: Monument
- Designated: 1932
- Reference no.: 178
- Conservation organization: Cultural Heritage, Handicrafts and Tourism Organization of Iran

Taq-e Gara (Persian: طاق گرا) also known as Taq-e Shirin (Persian: طاق شیرین) is a Sasanian era stone structure in Iran. It is built in the Patagh Pass in the heights known as the Gate of Zagros in Kermanshah Province of Iran. This structure is located on the way from Kermanshah to Sarpol-e Zahab, on the 15th kilometer from Sarpol-e Zahab; beside an ancient paving which connects the Iranian Plateau to Mesopotamia. Due to changes of the path, now it is located below the road slope.

== Design and construction ==
There are conflicting views as to the time of its construction. Parthian and Sasanian eras have been proposed, but most archeologists and historians believe that it has been built during late Sasanian era for a variety of reasons.

== Access and attributes ==
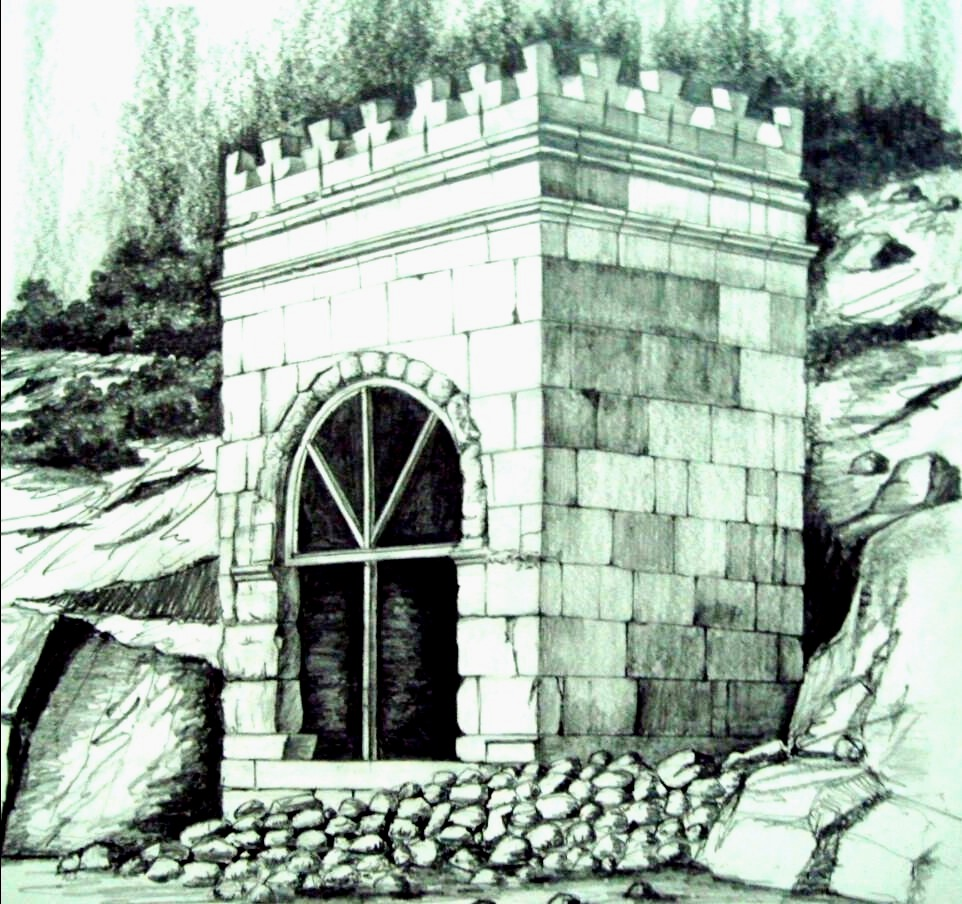

The monument is located on the old road from Kermanshah to Qasr-e Shirin with the new road overlooking it. It is about five hundred meters from the main road.

== See also ==
- Taq-e Bostan
- Taq-e Shirin and Farhad
