= Coronation of Ardashir II =

Sasanian rock relief in Iran

Coordinates: 34.3874°N 47.1323°E

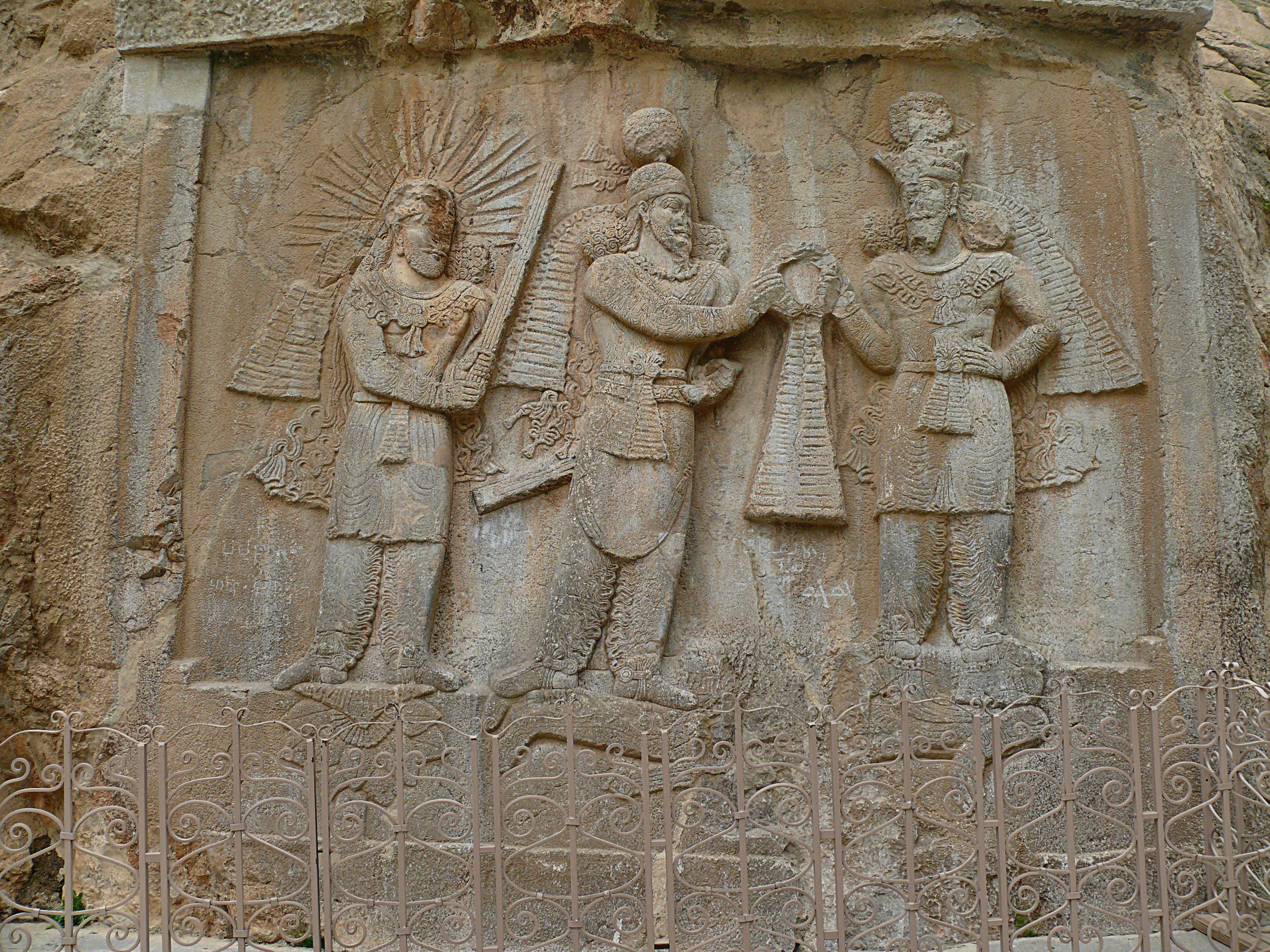
- The Coronation of Ardashir II. Ardashir II appears in the middle, receiving the diadem from Shapur II on the right, with Mithra standing to the left. The fallen enemy is most likely the Roman emperor Julian.
- Created: 379–383 CE

Location
- Location of relief Taq-e Bostan (Near East)

The Coronation of Ardashir II is a rock relief that was carved between 379 and 383 by Ardashir II, the eleventh king of kings (shahanshah) of the Sasanian Empire. The rock relief is located in Taq-e Bostan in Iran.

The relief shows three standing figures wearing regalia; Ardashir being in the middle, flanked by two male figures. The figure to the right, who is giving the diadem to Ardashir originally used to be recognized as the Zoroastrian supreme god Ahura Mazda, but is now agreed to be Shapur II due to the style of his crown, which also fits well due to Shapur being the one designating Ardashir as shah to begin with. The two shahs are standing on the body of a fallen enemy, unmistakably a Roman, whose crown indicates that he is an emperor. The fallen figure is most likely supposed to represent the Roman emperor Julian, who invaded Iran in 363 and was killed west of the Sasanian capital of Ctesiphon. The figure standing to the far left, perceived by some to be the Zoroastrian prophet Zoroaster, is most likely the angelic divinity Mithra. He is holding a raised barsom, thus sanctifying the investiture.

== Gallery ==
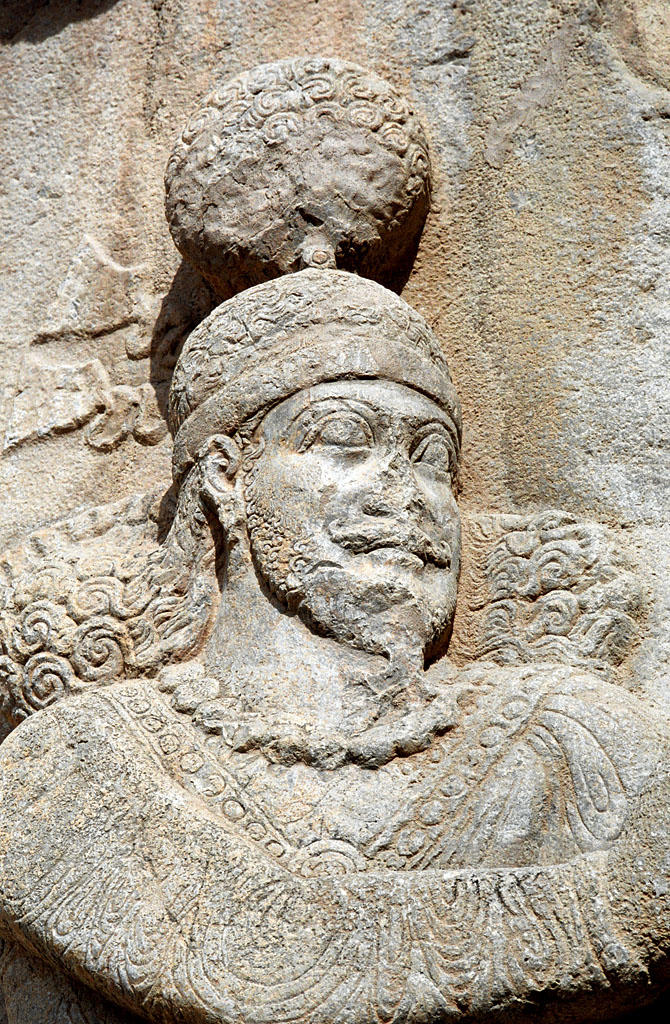
Ardashir II's figure

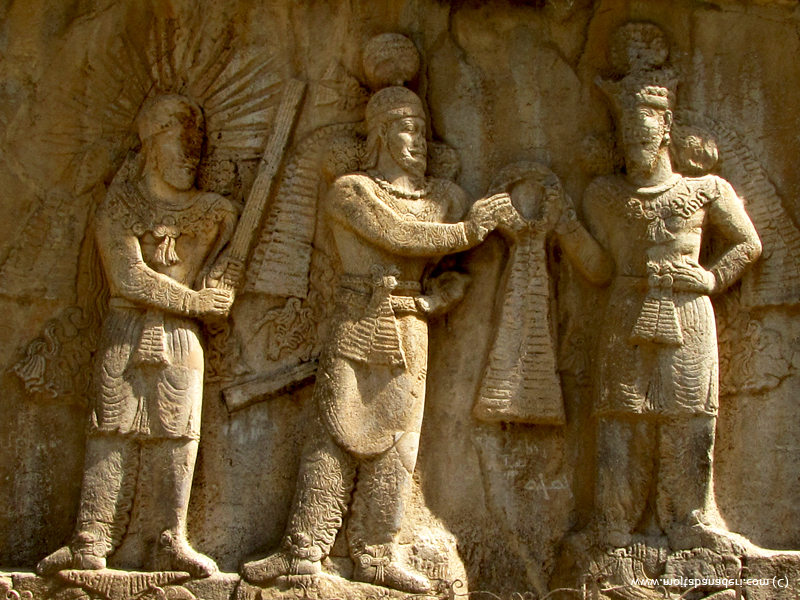

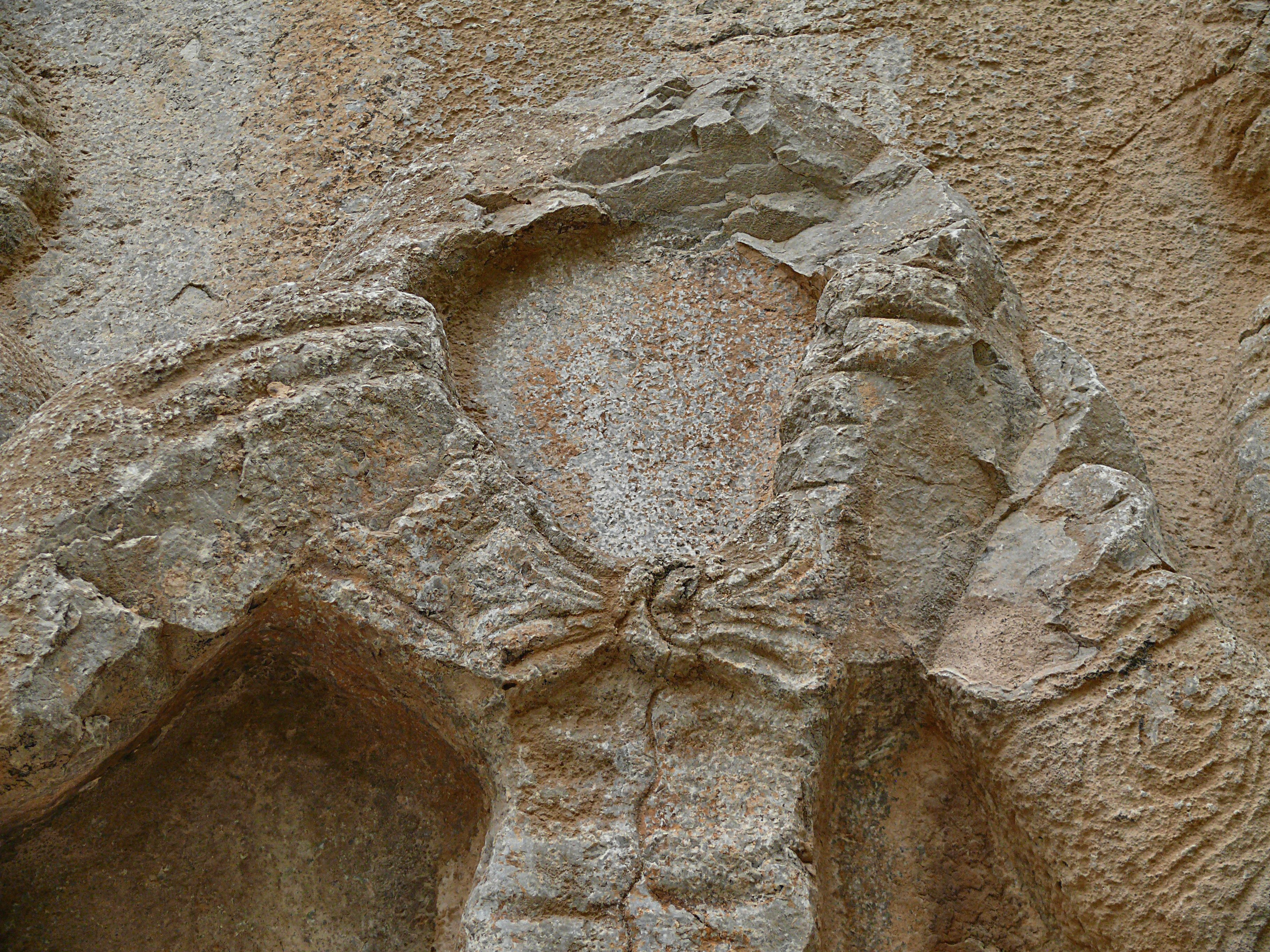
Detail of the Farshiang /Cybaris (ring of royal power)

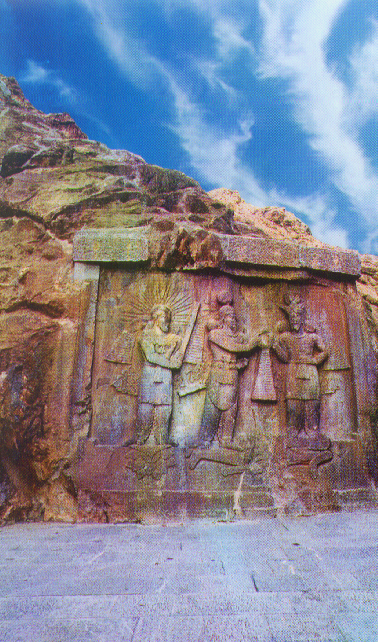
The crowning ceremony of Ardashir II

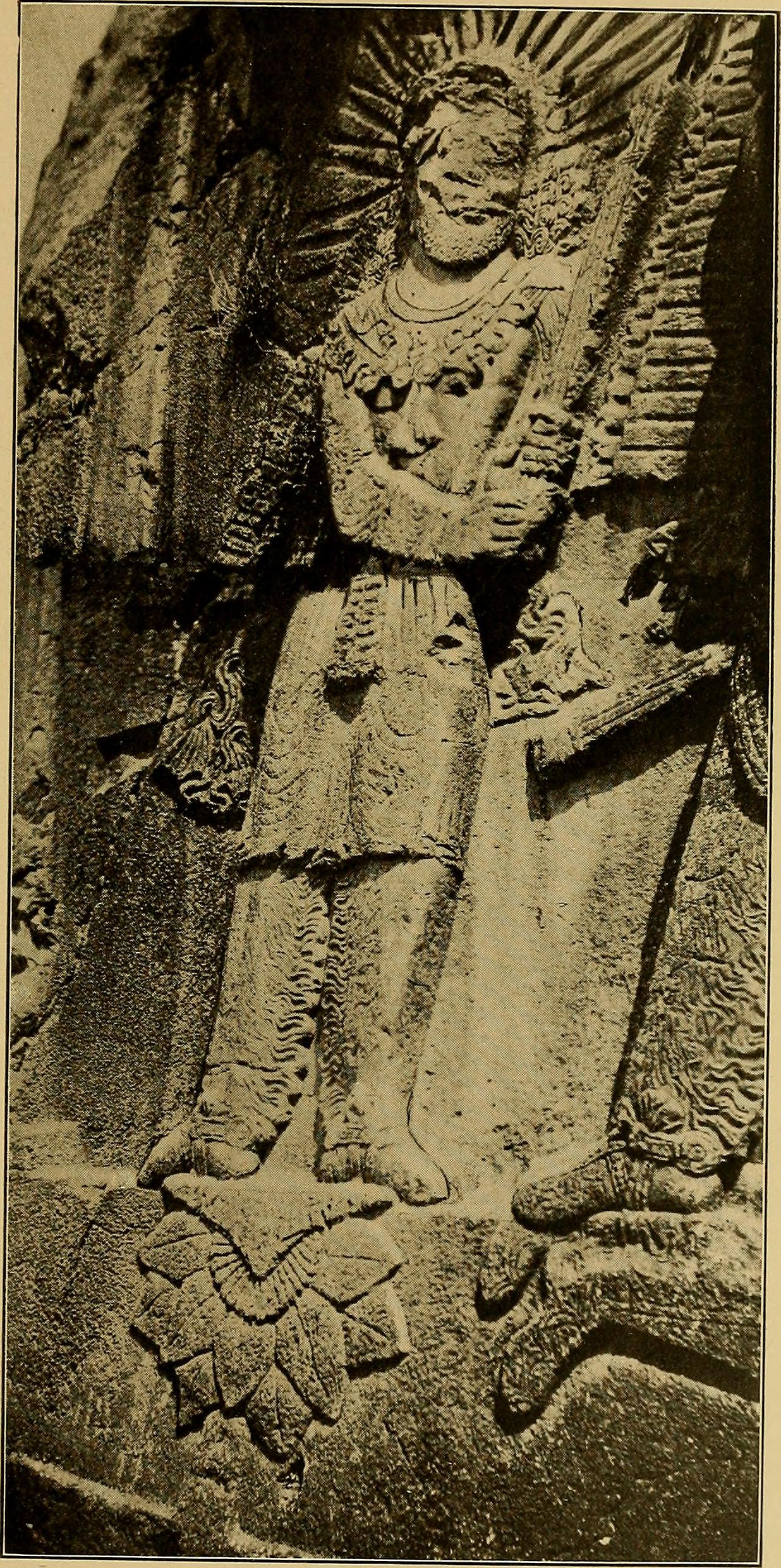
The cover of "Persia past and present; a book of travel and research, with more than two hundred illustrations and a map (1906) "

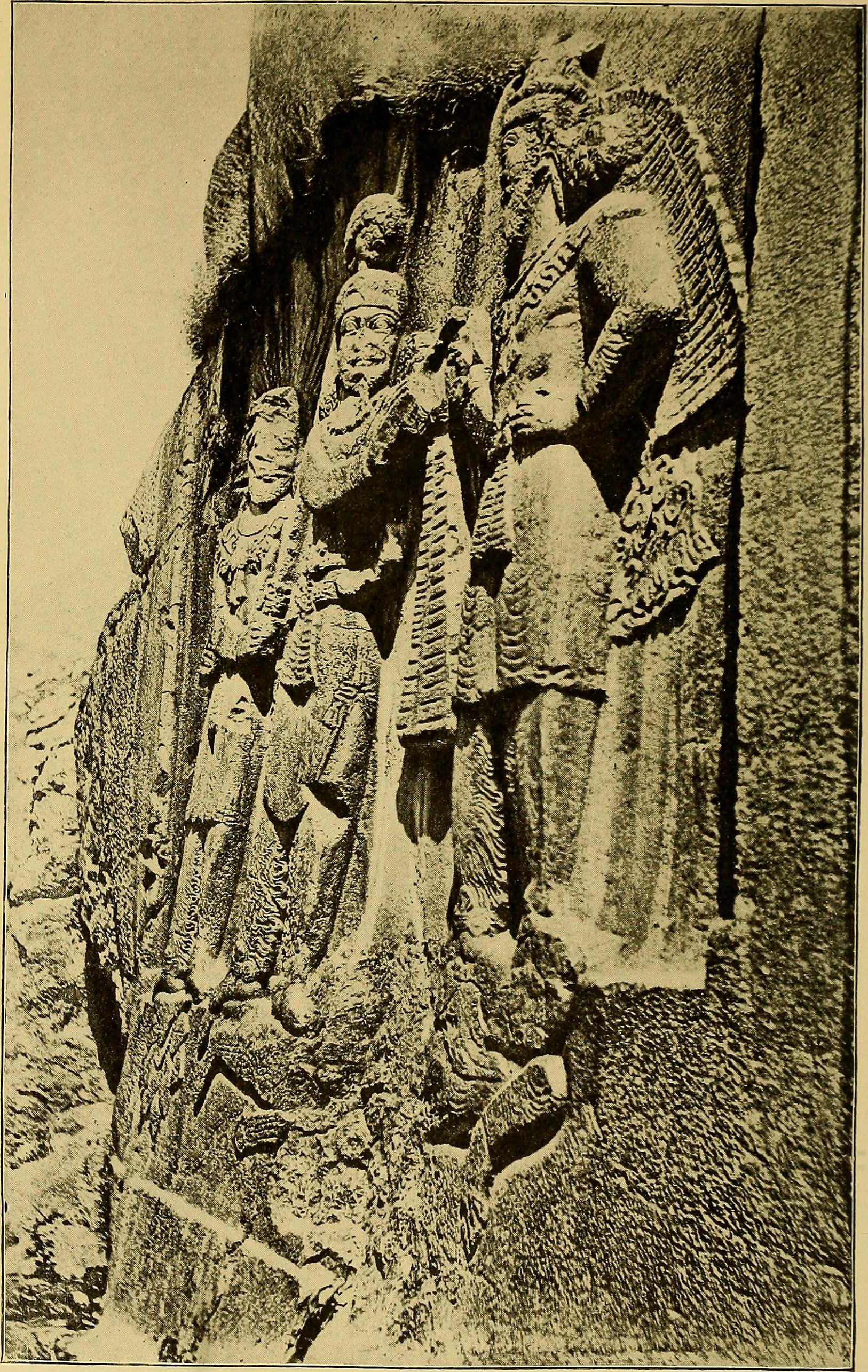
The cover of "Persia past and present; a book of travel and research, with more than two hundred illustrations and a map (1906) "

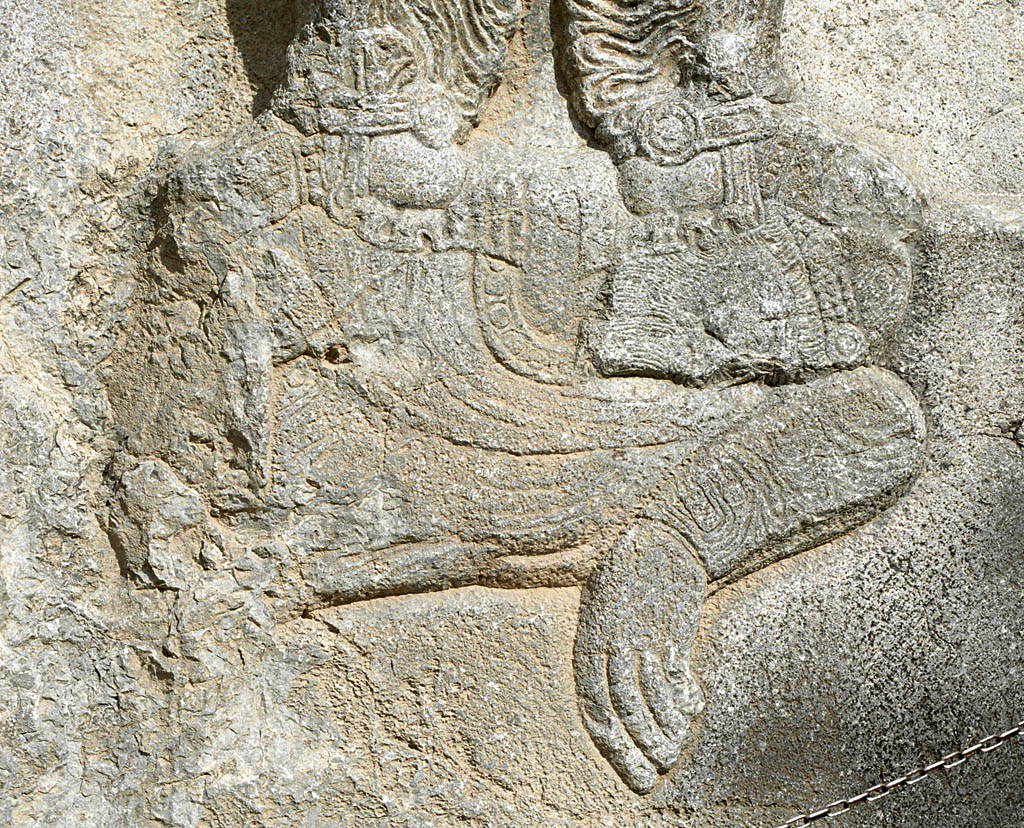
The fallen ruler at the feast of the two Sasanian Emperors.

== Sources ==
- Grenet, Franz (2006). "Mithra ii. iconography in Iran and Central Asia". Encyclopaedia Iranica.
- Shahbazi, A. Shapur (1986). "Ardašīr II". Encyclopaedia Iranica, Vol. II, Fasc. 4. pp. 380–381.
