= Kalan, Lorestan =

Kalan كلان
- Village
- Location within Iran
- Coordinates: 33°58′23″N 48°56′59″E
- Country: Iran
- Province: Lorestan
- County: Borujerd
- Bakhsh: Central
- Rural District: Darreh Seydi

Population (2006)
  - Total: 63
- Time zone: UTC+3:30 (IRST)
  - Summer (DST): UTC+4:30 (IRDT)

Kalan (Persian: كلان, also Romanized as Kalān, Kūlān, and Kullān) is a village in Darreh Seydi Rural District, in the Central District of Borujerd County, Lorestan Province, Iran. According to the 2006 census, its population was 63, in 13 families.
