= Eyvan =

City in Ilam province, Iran

Eyvan Persian: اِیوان
- City
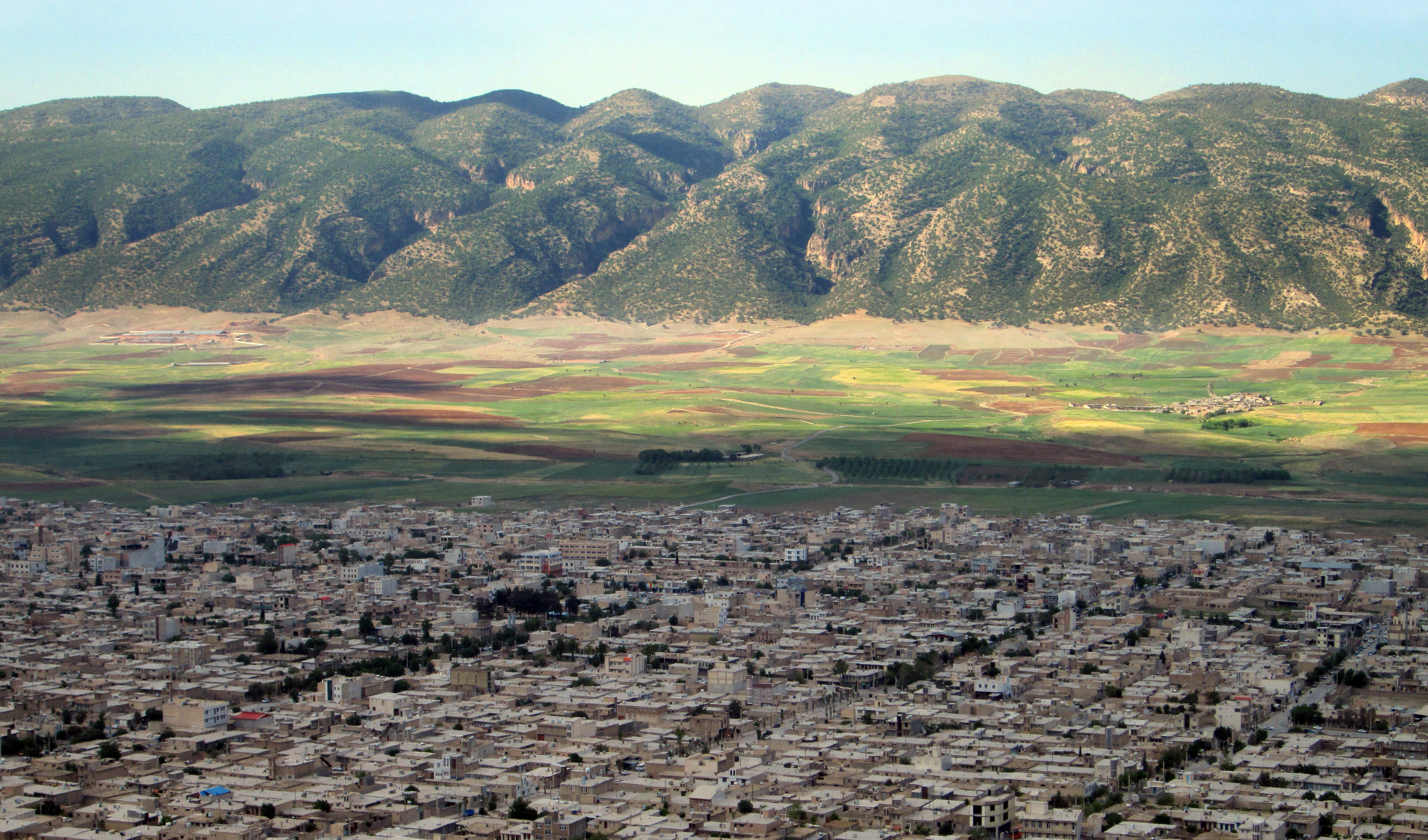
- Eyvan City

- Location within Iran Location within Ilam Province
- Coordinates: 33°49′40″N 46°18′22″E
- Country: Iran
- Province: Ilam
- County: Eyvan, Iran
- District: Central
- Elevation: 1,170 m (3,840 ft)

Population (2016)
  - Total: 31,299
- Time zone: UTC+3:30 (IRST)

Eyvan (Persian: ایوان) (Note: Also romanized as Aīvān and Eywān; also known as Eyvān-e Gharb and Jūy Zar; Kurdish: Eywan; formerly Bāgh-e Shāh and Bāgh-ī-Shāh) is a city in the Central District of Eyvan County, Ilam province, Iran, serving as capital of both the county and the district.

== Demographics ==
=== Language ===
The city is populated by Kurds who speak the Kalhori variety of Kurdish. Language composition:

Ilam linguistic composition
Language	percent
Southern Kurdish	95%
Mixed	5%

=== Population ===
At the time of the 2006 National Census, the city's population was 27,752 in 6,010 households. The following census in 2011 counted 29,400 people in 7,269 households. The 2016 census measured the population of the city as 31,299 people in 8,808 households.

== Infrastructure ==
=== Roads ===
Eyvan is on Road 17 (Iran). The Eyvan-Ilam part, which has recently been expanded into a four-lane road, is the busiest road in Ilam province. The Eyvan-Ilam route has one tunnel, the Payambare Azam, 1,480 meters long and inaugurated in February 2010. The 50-km Eyvan-Ilam route was made 11 km shorter, replacing the old Renu Tunnel. The Eyvan bypass project is planned to be completed in two years.

There are two secondary roads; the older is to Sumar and the newer to Gilan-e Gharb. Eyvan was connected to Gilan-e Gharb by a new route through Nawdar Road in 2015, making the distance between the two cities 40 minutes shorter.
