= Halashi, Karnataka =

Halashi Halasi
- Village
- Country: India
- State: Karnataka
- District: Belgaum
- Talukas: Khanapur

Government
  - Type: Panchayat raj
  - Body: Gram Panchayat

Languages
  - Official: Kannada
- Time zone: UTC+5:30 (IST)
- PIN: 591142
- Telephone code: 08336
- ISO 3166 code: IN-KA
- Vehicle registration: KA
- Nearest city: Belgaum
- Lok Sabha constituency: Karawar
- Vidhan Sabha constituency: Khanapur
- Civic agency: Gram Panchayat
- Website: karnataka.gov.in

Halashi (Halasi) is a historical village in Belgaum district in the southern state of Karnataka, India. It is about 45 kilometres (28 miles) away from Belgaum on the route to Dandeli, Goa.

Halashi was ruled by the Kadamba dynasty and was said to have 100 temples. The famous temples are Sri Lakshmi Narasimha, Kalmeswara, Suverneshwara. Ram Theertha and Vyasa Theertha group of temples near the village. The village has a famous Jain Basadi too. The village is surrounded by vegetation and mountains.
