= Taq-e Bostan =

Large rock reliefs in Iran from the Sassanid era

Coordinates: 34°23′15″N 47°07′56″E

Taq-e Bostan طاق بستان
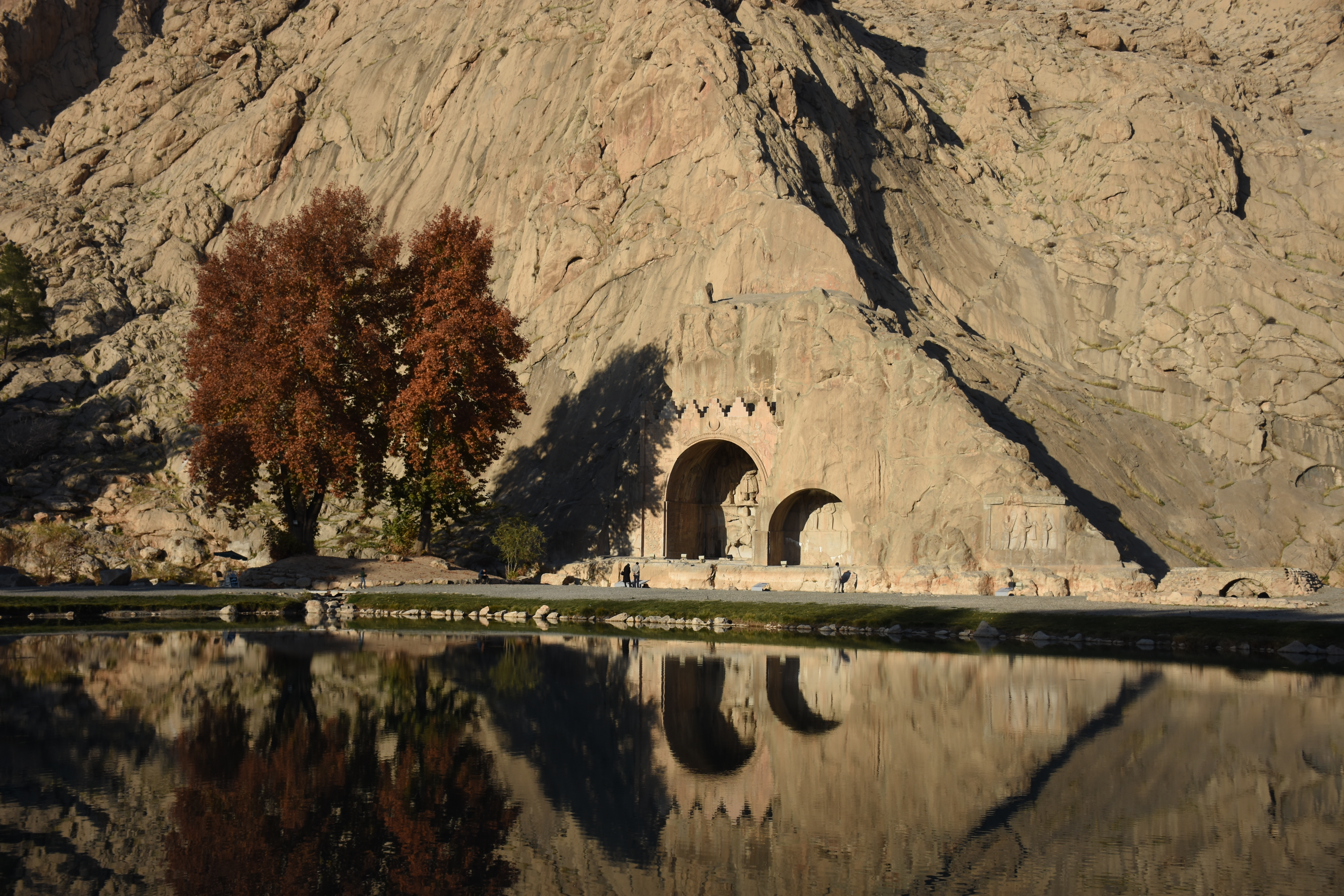
- Taq Bostan, a famous rock relief of Sassanid Iran

- Location within Iran
- Location: Kermanshah, Iran

History
- Built: ca. 4th century CE

Site notes
- Architectural style: Persian architecture
- Visitors: (in

Iran National Heritage List
- Official name: Taq-e Bostan
- Type: Rock Relief
- Designated: 1932
- Reference no.: 172
- Conservation organization: Cultural Heritage, Handicrafts and Tourism Organization of Iran
- )

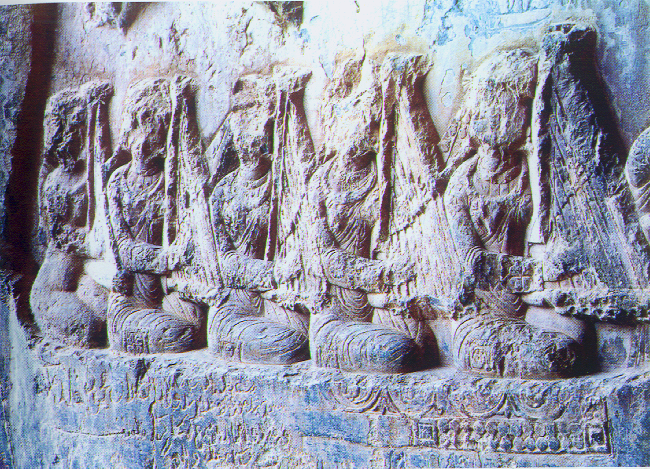
A Taq-e Bostan carving depicts women playing changs (Persian harps) while the king is hunting.

Taq-e Bostan (Persian: طاق‌بستان, Kurdish: تاق وەسان, lit. 'Arch of stone') is a site with a series of large rock reliefs in Kermanshah, Iran, carved around the 4th century CE during the Sasanian era.

This example of Sasanian art is located 5 km from the city center of Kermanshah. It is located in the heart of the Zagros Mountains, where it has endured almost 1,700 years of wind and rain. Originally, several natural springs were visible next to and below the reliefs and arches, some of which are now covered. Springs next to the reliefs still feed a large basin in front of the rock. The site has been turned into an archaeological park and a series of late Sasanian and Islamic column capitals have been brought together (some found at Taq Bostan, others at Mount Behistun and Kermanshah).

The carvings, some of the finest and best-preserved examples of Persian sculpture under the Sassanids, include representations of the investitures of Ardashir II (379–383) and Shapur III (383–388). Like other Sassanid symbols, Taq-e Bostan, and its relief patterns accentuate power, religious tendencies, glory, honour, the vastness of the court, game and fighting spirit, festivity, joy, and rejoicing.

The reliefs are along a historic Silk Road caravan route waypoint and campground adjacent to sacred springs that empty into a large reflecting pool at the base of a mountain cliff.

Taq-e Bostan and its rock relief are one of the 30 surviving Sassanid relics of the Zagros Mountains. According to Arthur Pope, the founder of the Iranian Art and Archeology Institute in the United States of America, "art was characteristic of the Iranian people and the gift which they endowed the world with."

== Description of the rock reliefs ==
The Taq-e Bostan complex comprise a rock relief standing on its own and several more reliefs associated with two rock cut arches.

=== Investiture of Ardashir II ===
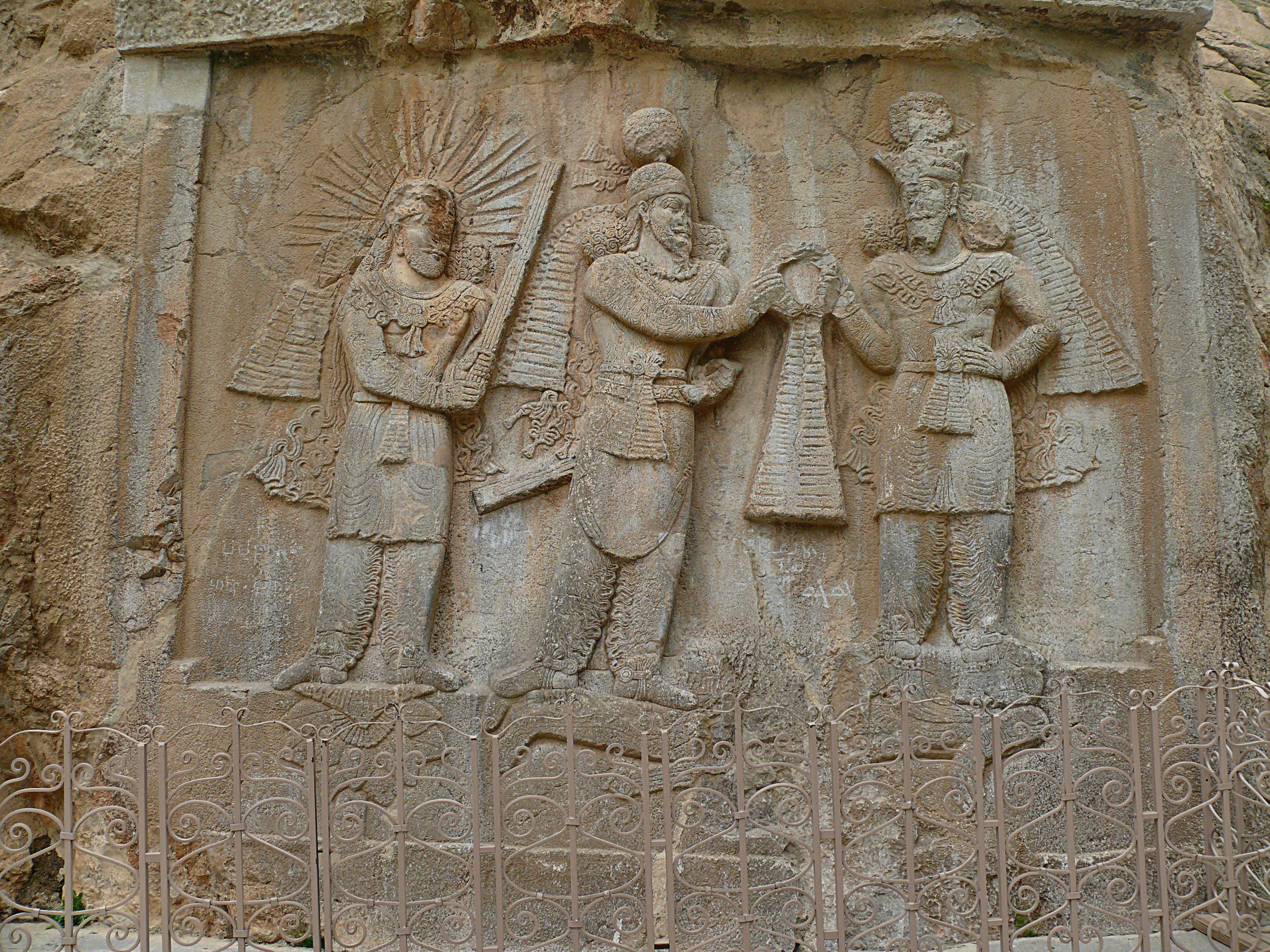
The Coronation of Ardashir II. Ardashir II appears in the middle, receiving the diadem from Shapur II on the right, with Mithra standing to the left. The fallen enemy is most likely the Roman emperor Julian.

The relief panel is approx. 4.07 m wide and 3.9 m high.

=== Shapur II and Shapur III ===
The smaller arch or iwan (Taq-e Bustan II) has, on the upper part of the back wall, two Pahlavi inscriptions identifying two royal figures as Shapur II (Shapur the Great) and his son Shapur III. They are shown facing each other. The arch's vestibule measures 6 x 5 x 3.6 meters. It has been suggested as having been built during the reign of Shapur III and some put the date of its completion at 385 AD. However, the royal crown of Shapur III does not agree with those on his coins and is closer to that of his predecessor Ardashir II. It has been argued that the texts represent an usurpation of Ardashir's relief by Shapur III. The translation of the inscriptions follows:

Shapur II inscription :

This is the figure of Mazda-worshipping Lord Shapur, the king of kings of Iran and Aniran, whose race is from the Gods. Son of Mazda-worshipping Lord Hormizd, the king of kings of Iran and Aniran, whose race is from the Gods, grandson of Lord Nersi, the Shahanshah (king of kings).

Shapur III inscription:

This is the figure of Mazda-worshipping Lord Shapur, the king of kings of Iran and Aniran, whose race is from the Gods. Son of Mazda-worshipping Lord Shapur, the king of kings of Iran and Aniran, whose race is from the Gods, grandson of Lord Hormizd, the king of kings.

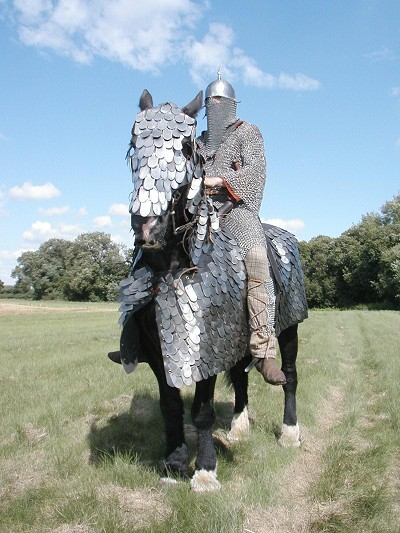
Speculative Historical reenactment of a Sassanid cataphract, complete with a full set of scale armour for the horse. The rider is covered by extensive mail armour, (photographed in Oxford, U.K.)

=== Iwan of Khosrow II ===
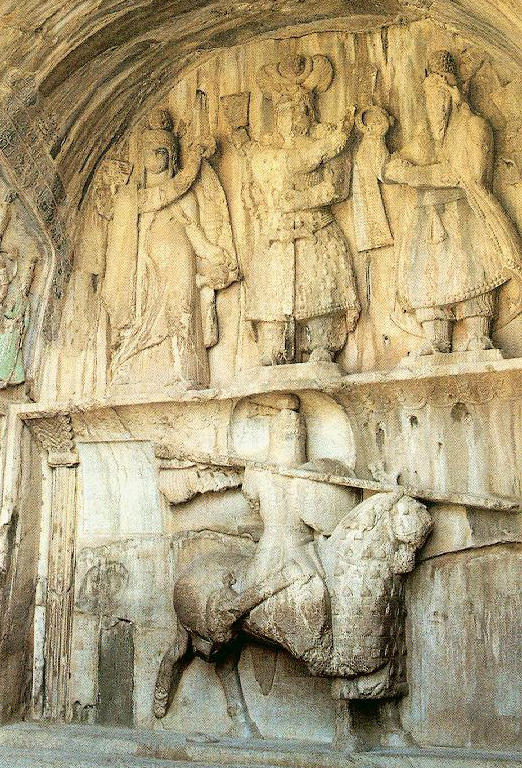
Relief of a victorious Khosrow II mounted on his favorite horse, Shabdiz; Taq-e Bostan

The three figures on the back wall of the large iwan are usually considered to represent Khosrow II flanked by Ahura Mazda and Anahita.

=== Scene of boar and deer hunting ===
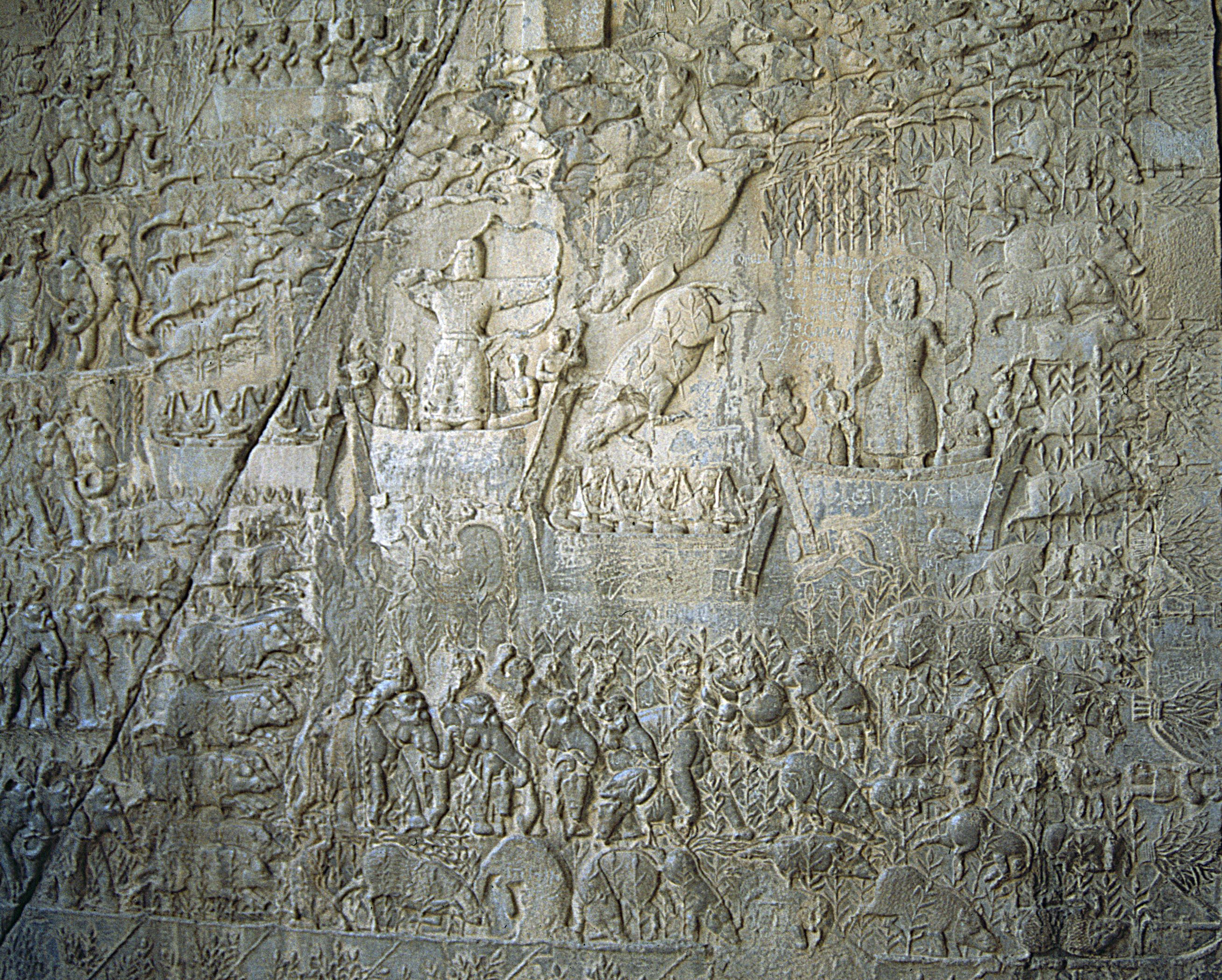
Scene of boar hunting Khosrow II. The recurve bow used by the king is considered Hunnish.

There are two hunting scenes on each side of the ivan.

=== Dowlatshah Relief ===
The upper relief, added in the 19th century, shows the Qajar era Governor in Kermanshah, Mohammad-Ali Mirza Dowlatshah, in front of Fath-Ali Shah Qajar.

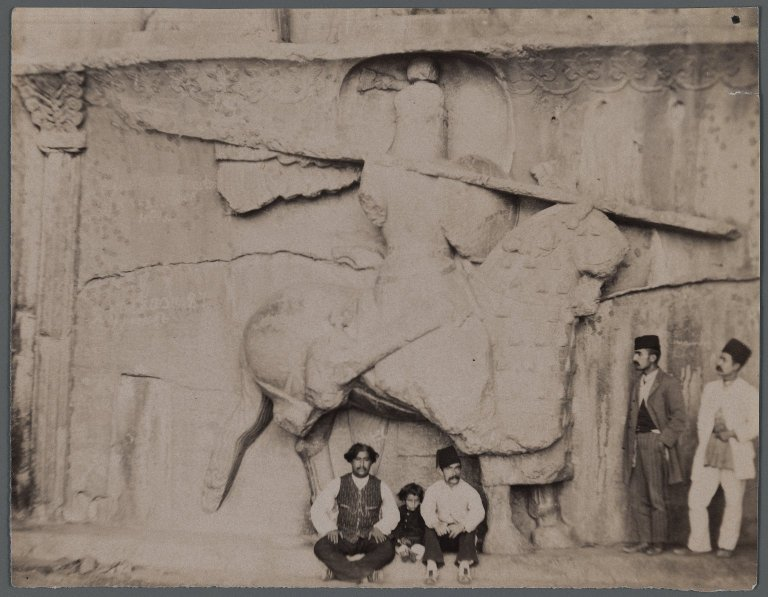
Photograph taken at Taq-e Bostan, late Qajar era

=== Taq-e Bostan Photos ===
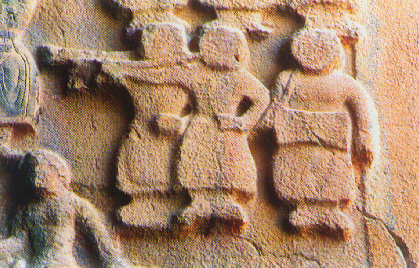
Female musicians accompanying king during hunting

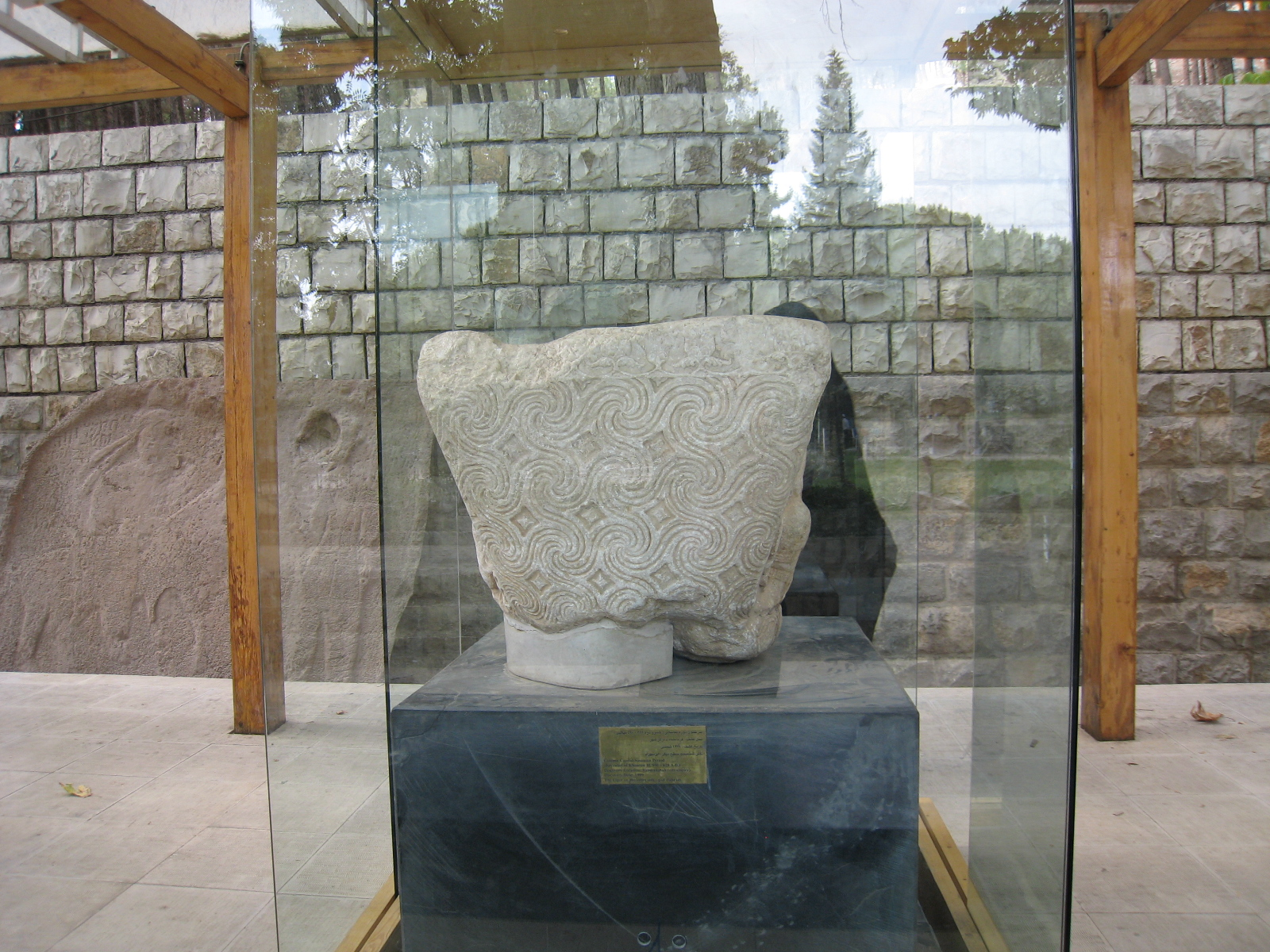
Capital of a Sasanian column in Taq-e Bostan complex with geometrical design

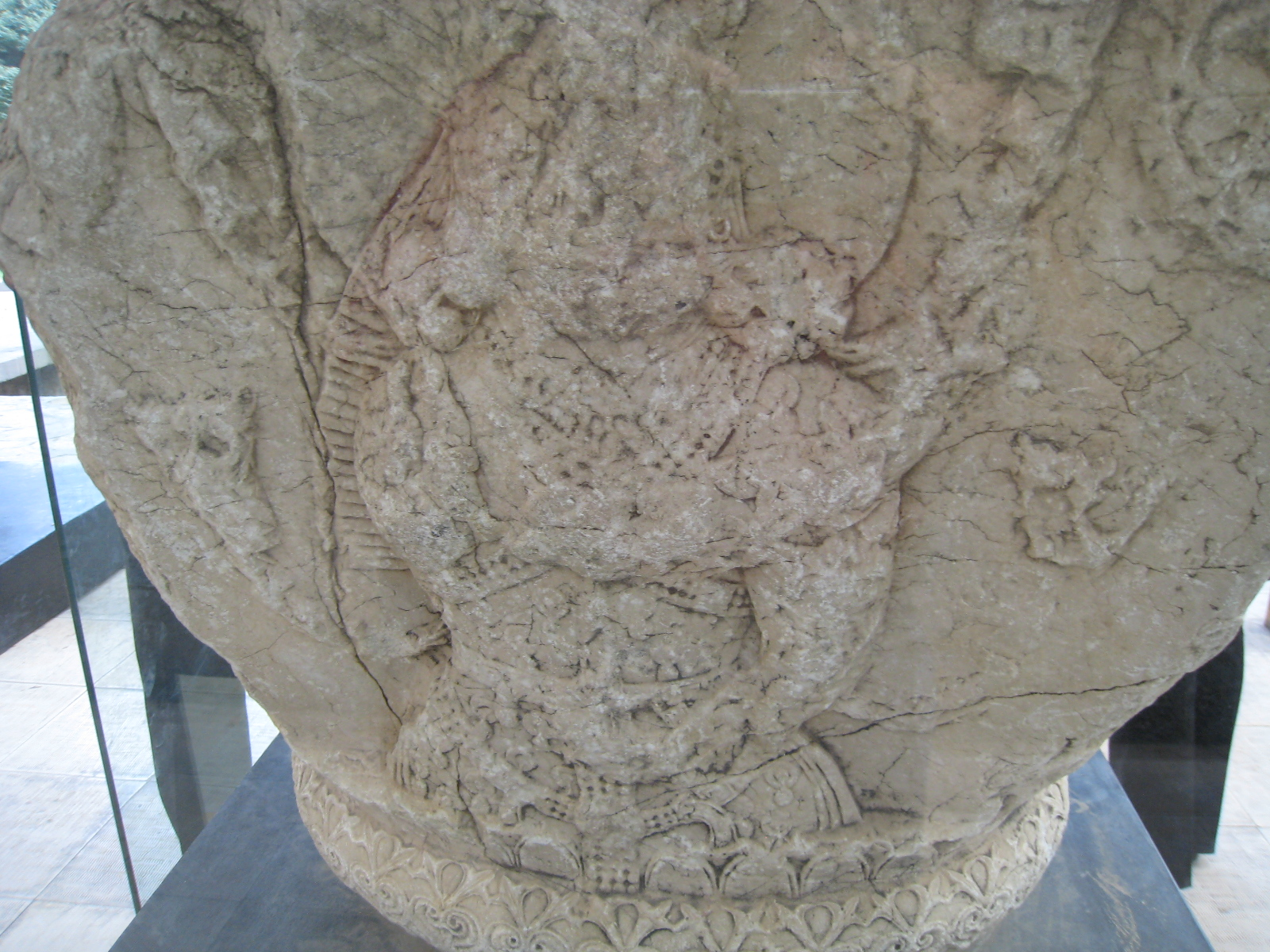
Capital of a column with figural decoration of a Sasanian king

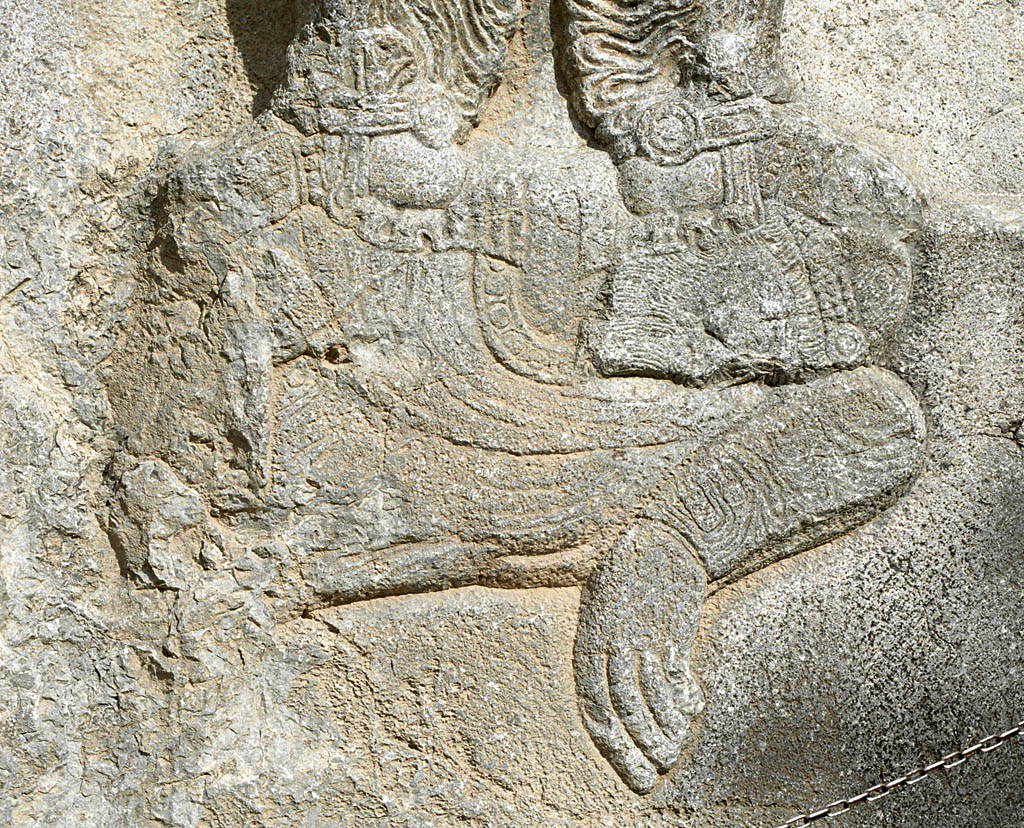
Details from a Sassanid relief on the incoronation of Ardashir showing a defeated Julian.

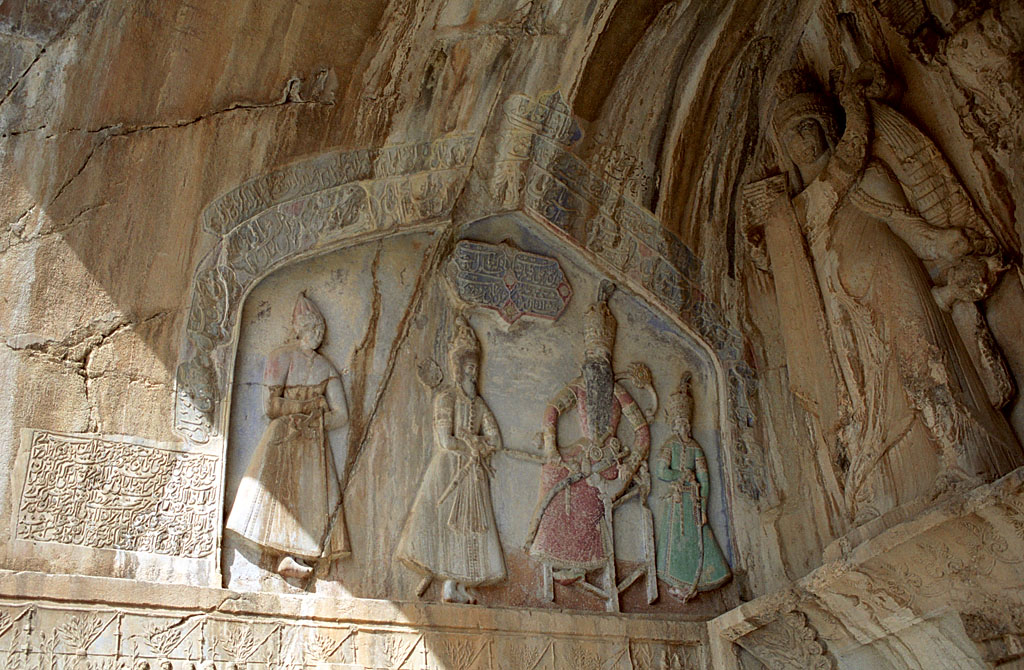
Relief of Fath-Ali Shah Qajar, added to the ancient complex in the 19th century.

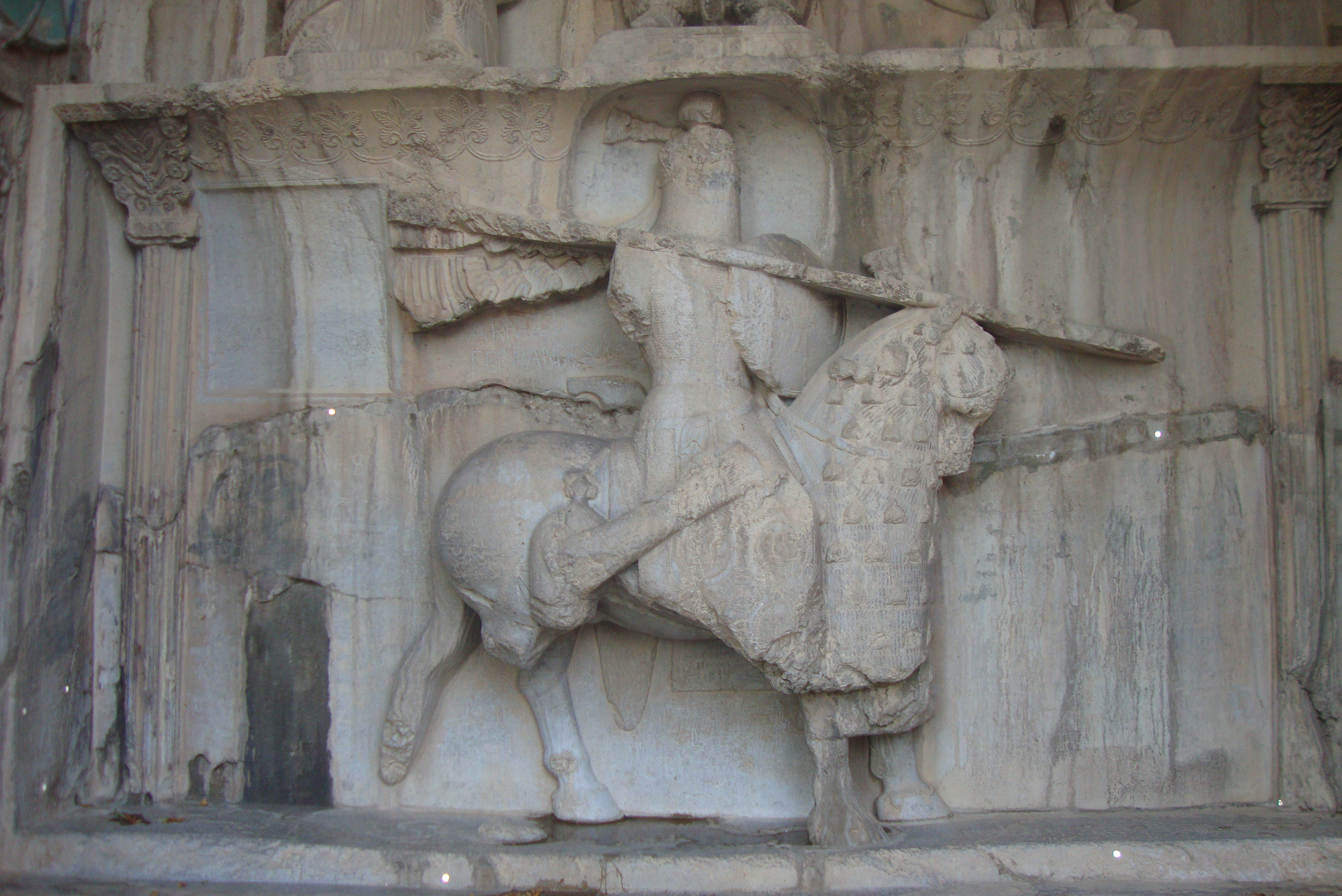
Relief of Khosrow II

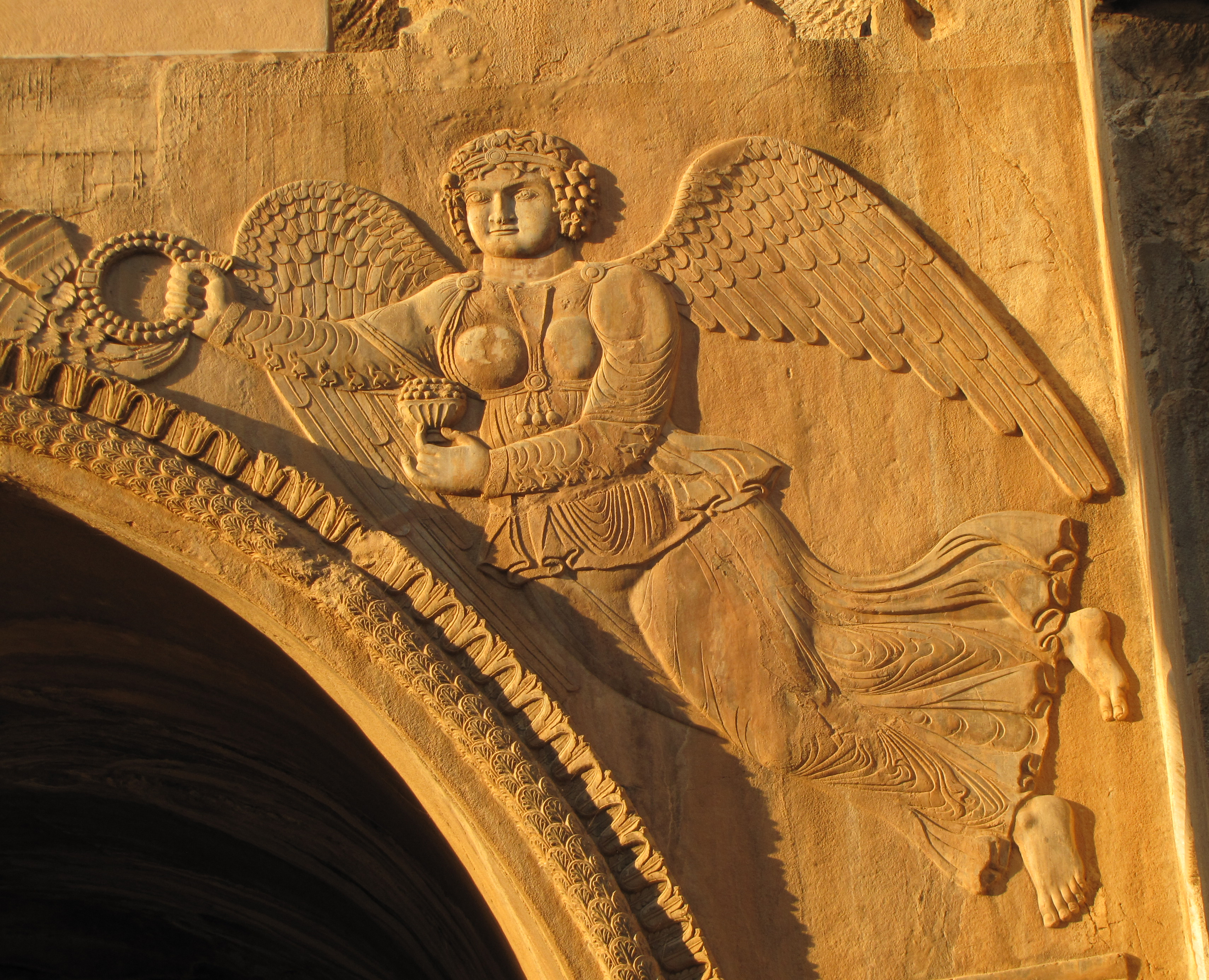
Relief of Elaheh (Angel)

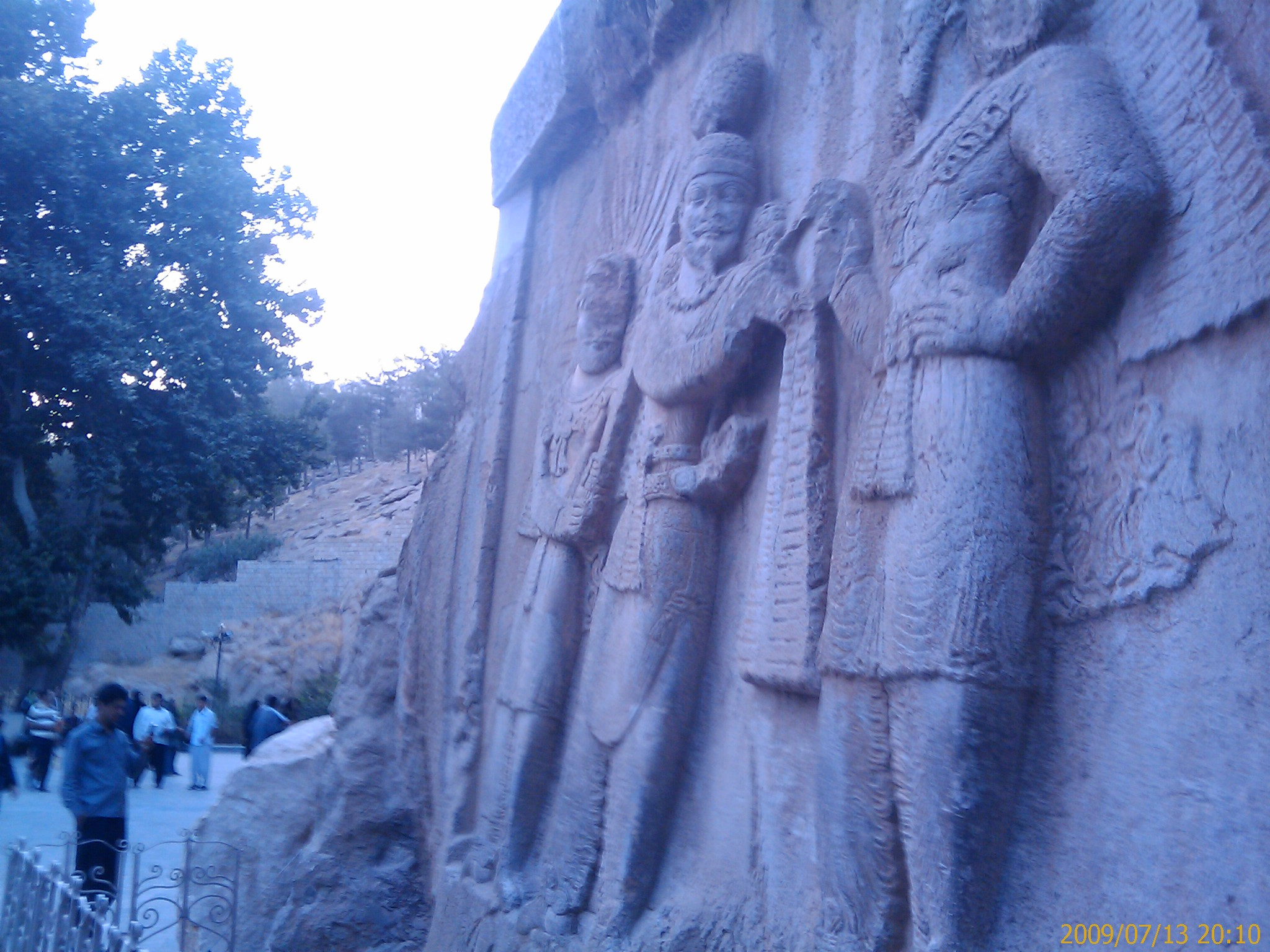
Statue of Ardeshir II

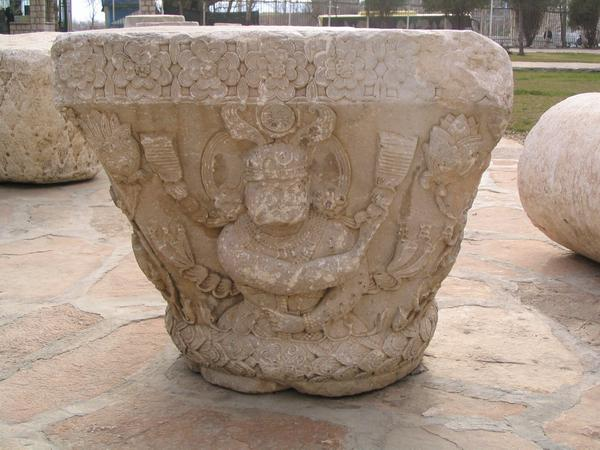
Capital of Khosrow II

== See also ==
- Taq Kasra
- Taq-e Gara
- Sassanid architecture
- Naghsh-e Rajab
- Naqsh-e Rostam
- Bishapur
- List of colossal sculptures in situ
