= Kalan, Varzaqan =

Kalan كلان
- Village
- Location within Iran
- Coordinates: 38°39′05″N 46°35′43″E
- Country: Iran
- Province: East Azerbaijan
- County: Varzaqan
- Bakhsh: Central
- Rural District: Ozomdel-e Jonubi

Population (2006)
  - Total: 62
- Time zone: UTC+3:30 (IRST)
  - Summer (DST): UTC+4:30 (IRDT)

Kalan (Persian: كلان, also Romanized as Kalān; also known as Kalan Ozomdeh, Kalyan, Keyāteyān, and Kialian) is a village in Ozomdel-e Jonubi Rural District, in the Central District of Varzaqan County, East Azerbaijan Province, Iran. At the 2006 census, its population was 62, in 14 families.
