= Band Sar Chukat =

Band Sar Chukat بند سرچوکات
- Village
- Location within Iran
- Coordinates: 25°38′26″N 61°00′25″E
- Country: Iran
- Province: Sistan and Baluchestan
- County: Chabahar
- Bakhsh: Polan
- Rural District: Polan

Population (2006)
  - Total: 708
- Time zone: UTC+3:30 (IRST)
  - Summer (DST): UTC+4:30 (IRDT)

Band Sar Chukat (Persian: بند سرچوکات, also Romanized as Band Sar Chūkāt; also known as Zavast Moḩammad and Band Sar) is a village in Polan Rural District, Polan District, Chabahar County, Sistan and Baluchestan Province, Iran. At the 2006 census, its population was 708, in 171 families.
