= Dholla Kalan =

Village in Pakistan

Dholla Kalan is a village in Tehsil Phalia, Mandi Bahauddin District, Punjab, Pakistan. It is located about 11 kilometres from Phalia, the headquarters of Tehsil Phalia, on a road running between the two.

Dholla Kalan is one of two areas within the village of Dholla, the other being Dhola Khurd. The words Khurd and Kalan are administrative terms which date back to Mughal times. They are used to differentiate between two areas with the same name based on their size relative to each other. The words are taken from Persian and translate to "big" and "small" respectively.

Nearby villages include Saida Sharif, Dhall Tararan, Kala Shadian, Dogul, and Seeray.

== Population ==
Dholla Kalan has a population of over 7,000 people. Most of the population work in agriculture, cultivating wheat, rice, sugar, and various types of vegetables.

A large number of young people from the village have settled abroad to earn their livings, most of them in Saudi Arabia.

== Facilities ==
There are government-run elementary schools for each gender, and there is an elementary school for girls. There are no hospitals in Dholla Kalan but there are some individuals who have small dispensaries at their homes. There are two private Schools in Dhola Kalan: Al Wahid Model School and Mustafai Model School.

Dolla Kalan has an official playground, where games like cricket, volleyball, and football are popular, among others.

The most famous religious personality of Dholla is Mian Haji Sahib, whose Darbar is situated in the south of Dholla Khurd Near Qabiristan.

Darbar Mian Haji Sahib Dholla
