= Zarneh =

City in Ilam province, Iran

Zarneh Persian: زرنه
- City
- Location within Iran Location within Ilam Province
- Coordinates: 33°55′40″N 46°10′57″E
- Country: Iran
- Province: Ilam
- County: Eyvan
- District: Zarneh

Government
  - Mayor: Dr. Saeed Esmaeili

Population (2016)
  - Total: 2,966
- Time zone: UTC+3:30 (IRST)

Zarneh (Persian: زرنه) (Note: Also known as Kanī Razneh, Kāni Zarnah, and Zarrīneh) is a city in, and the capital of, Zarneh District of Eyvan County, Ilam province, Iran. As a village, it was the capital of Zarneh Rural District until its capital was transferred to the village of Taran.

== Demographics ==
=== Ethnicity ===
The city is populated by Kurds.

=== Population ===
At the time of the 2006 National Census, the city's population was 2,909 in 605 households. The following census in 2011 counted 3,118 people in 748 households. The 2016 census measured the population of the city as 2,966 people in 785 households.
