= Zarneh Rural District =

Rural district in Ilam province, Iran

Zarneh Rural District Persian: دهستان زرنه
- Rural District
- Location within Iran Location within Ilam Province
- Coordinates: 33°57′30″N 46°06′15″E
- Country: Iran
- Province: Ilam
- County: Eyvan
- District: Zarneh
- Capital: Taran

Population (2016)
  - Total: 2,334
- Time zone: UTC+3:30 (IRST)

Zarneh Rural District (Persian: دهستان زرنه) is in Zarneh District of Eyvan County, Ilam province, Iran. Its capital is the village of Taran. The previous capital of the rural district was the village of Zarneh, now a city.

== Demographics ==
=== Population ===
At the time of the 2006 National Census, the rural district's population was 2,778 in 571 households. There were 2,872 inhabitants in 626 households at the following census of 2011. The 2016 census measured the population of the rural district as 2,334 in 621 households. The most populous of its 30 villages was Chahar Meleh, with 772 people.
