= Kalan Rural District =

Rural district in Ilam province, Iran

Kalan Rural District Persian: دهستان كلان
- Rural District
- Location within Iran Location within Ilam Province
- Coordinates: 33°53′29″N 46°05′57″E
- Country: Iran
- Province: Ilam
- County: Eyvan
- District: Zarneh
- Capital: Kalan

Population (2016)
  - Total: 2,484
- Time zone: UTC+3:30 (IRST)

Kalan Rural District (Persian: دهستان كلان) is in Zarneh District of Eyvan County, Ilam province, Iran. Its capital is the village of Kalan.

== Demographics ==
=== Population ===
At the time of the 2006 National Census, the rural district's population was 3,835 in 783 households. There were 2,900 inhabitants in 670 households at the following census of 2011. The 2016 census measured the population of the rural district as 2,484 in 672 households. The most populous of its 34 villages was Kapneh Karan, with 558 people.
