= Sarab Rural District (Eyvan County) =

Rural district in Ilam province, Iran

Sarab Rural District Persian: دهستان سراب
- Rural District
- Location within Iran Location within Ilam Province
- Coordinates: 33°46′51″N 46°21′49″E
- Country: Iran
- Province: Ilam
- County: Eyvan
- District: Central
- Capital: Sarab

Population (2016)
  - Total: 4,114
- Time zone: UTC+3:30 (IRST)

Sarab Rural District (Persian: دهستان سراب) is in the Central District of Eyvan County, Ilam province, Iran. Its capital is the village of Sarab.

== Demographics ==
=== Population ===
At the time of the 2006 National Census, the rural district's population was 3,690 in 813 households. There were 4,042 inhabitants in 1,005 households at the following census of 2011. The 2016 census measured the population of the rural district as 4,114 in 1,157 households. The most populous of its 29 villages was Sarab, with 1,413 people.
