= Zarneh District =

District in Ilam province, Iran

Zarneh District Persian: بخش زرنه
- District
- Location within Iran Location within Ilam Province
- Coordinates: 33°55′18″N 46°06′13″E
- Country: Iran
- Province: Ilam
- County: Eyvan
- Capital: Zarneh

Population (2016)
  - Total: 7,784
- Time zone: UTC+3:30 (IRST)

Zarneh District (Persian: بخش زرنه) is in Eyvan County, Ilam province, Iran. Its capital is the city of Zarneh.

== Demographics ==
=== Population ===
At the time of the 2006 National Census, the district's population was 9,522 in 1,959 households. The following census in 2011 counted 8,890 people in 2,044 households. The 2016 census measured the population of the district as 7,784 inhabitants in 2,078 households.

=== Administrative divisions ===
Zarneh District Population
Administrative Divisions	2006	2011	2016
Kalan RD	3,835	2,900	2,484
Zarneh RD	2,778	2,872	2,334
Zarneh (city)	2,909	3,118	2,966
Total	9,522	8,890	7,784
RD = Rural District

== See also ==
Taq e Shirin and Farhad
