= Central District (Eyvan County) =

District in Ilam province, Iran

Central District (Eyvan County) Persian: بخش مرکزی شهرستان ایوان
- District
- Location within Iran Location within Ilam Province
- Coordinates: 33°48′08″N 46°18′32″E
- Country: Iran
- Province: Ilam
- County: Eyvan
- Capital: Eyvan

Population (2016)
  - Total: 41,617
- Time zone: UTC+3:30 (IRST)

The Central District of Eyvan County (Persian: بخش مرکزی شهرستان ایوان) is in Ilam province, Iran. Its capital is the city of Eyvan.

== Demographics ==
=== Population ===
At the time of the 2006 National Census, the district's population was 37,858 in 8,081 households. The following census in 2011 counted 39,909 people in 9,821 households. The 2016 census measured the population of the district as 41,617 inhabitants in 11,718 households.

=== Administrative divisions ===
Central District (Eyvan County) Population
Administrative Divisions	2006	2011	2016
Nabovat RD (Note: Formerly Sarab-e Eyvan Rural District)	6,416	6,467	6,204
Sarab RD	3,690	4,042	4,114
Eyvan (city)	27,752	29,400	31,299
Total	37,858	39,909	41,617
RD = Rural District
