= Eyvan County =

County in Ilam Province, Iran

Eyvan County Persian: شهرستان ایوان
- County
- Location of Eyvan County in Ilam province (top, pink)

- Location of Ilam Province in Iran
- Coordinates: 33°52′N 46°09′E
- Country: Iran
- Province: Ilam
- Capital: Eyvan
- Districts: Central, Zarneh

Population (2016)
  - Total: 49,491
- Time zone: UTC+3:30 (IRST)

Eyvan County (Persian: شهرستان ایوان) (Note: Also romanized as Eywan, Aivan, and Shahrestān-e Eyvan) is in Ilam province, Iran. Its capital is the city of Eyvan.

== Demographics ==
=== Ethnicity ===
The population of Eyvan County is mainly Kurdish.

=== Population ===
At the time of the 2006 National Census, the county's population was 47,380 in 10,040 households. The following census in 2011 counted 48,833 people in 11,859 households. The 2016 census measured the population of the county as 49,491 in 13,820 households.

=== Administrative divisions ===
Eyvan County's population history and administrative structure over three consecutive censuses are shown in the following table.

Eyvan County Population
Administrative Divisions	2006	2011	2016
Central District	37,858	39,909	41,617
Nabovat RD (Note: Formerly Sarab-e Eyvan Rural District)	6,416	6,467	6,204
Sarab RD	3,690	4,042	4,114
Eyvan (city)	27,752	29,400	31,299
Zarneh District	9,522	8,890	7,784
Kalan RD	3,835	2,900	2,484
Zarneh RD	2,778	2,872	2,334
Zarneh (city)	2,909	3,118	2,966
Total	47,380	48,833	49,491
RD = Rural District

List of cities and villages in the county by historical population (ranked according to the 2016 National Census)

Rank	City/Village	2006	2011	2016
1	Eyvan (ایوان)	27,752	29,400	31,299
2	Zarneh (زرنه)	2,778	2,872	2,334
3	Shahrak-e Nabovat (شهرک نبوت)	1,413	1,515	1,509
4	Sarab (سراب)	1,522	1,506	1,413
5	Chahar Meleh (چهارمله)	802	839	772

== See also ==
- Kalhor
- Taq-e Shirin and Farhad
- Ghalajeh tunnel
- Ghalajeh Protected Area
- Ilam County
- Chavar County

Media related to Eyvan County at Wikimedia Commons
