= Cheshmeh Kabud =

Cheshmeh Kabud or Chashmeh Kabud (Persian: چشمه کبود) may refer to:

== Hamadan Province ==
- Cheshmeh Kabud, Bahar
- Cheshmeh Kabud, Nahavand

== Ilam Province ==
- Cheshmeh Kabud, Ilam
- Cheshmeh Kabud, Shirvan and Chardaval

== Kermanshah Province ==
- Cheshmeh Kabud, Eslamabad-e Gharb, a village in Eslamabad-e Gharb County
- Cheshmeh Kabud, Gilan-e Gharb, a village in Gilan-e Gharb County
- Cheshmeh Kabud, Harsin, a village in Harsin County
- Cheshmeh Kabud, Bisotun, a village in Harsin County
- Cheshmeh Kabud Rural District, in Harsin County
- Cheshmeh Kabud, Kermanshah, a village in Kermanshah County
- Cheshmeh Kabud, Firuzabad, a village in Kermanshah County
- Cheshmeh Kabud-e Chenar, a village in Kermanshah County
- Cheshmeh Kabud-e Chenar, alternate name of Chenar-e Sofla, Kermanshah
- Cheshmeh Kabud-e Olya, a village in Kermanshah County
- Cheshmeh Kabud-e Sofla, a village in Kermanshah County

== Kurdistan Province ==
- Cheshmeh Kabud, Kurdistan, a village in Kamyaran County

== Lorestan Province ==
- Cheshmeh Kabud, Borujerd
- Cheshmeh Kabud, Delfan (disambiguation)
  - Cheshmeh Kabud, Itivand-e Shomali
  - Cheshmeh Kabud, Kakavand-e Sharqi
  - Cheshmeh Kabud, Mirbag-e Shomali
- Cheshmeh Kabud, Kuhdasht
- Cheshmeh Kabud, alternate name of Seyyed Ahmad Shah
- Cheshmeh Kabud, Pol-e Dokhtar

== Razavi Khorasan Province ==
- Cheshmeh Kabud, Razavi Khorasan
