= Cham Kabud =

Cham Kabud or Cham-e Kabud (Persian: چم كبود) may refer to:

- Cham Kabud, Hamadan
- Cham Kabud, Abdanan, Ilam Province
- Cham Kabud, Shirvan and Chardaval, Ilam Province
- Cham Kabud, Harsin, Kermanshah Province
- Cham Kabud, Sonqor, Kermanshah Province
- Cham Kabud-e Chenar, Kermanshah Province
- Cham Kabud, Lorestan
- Cham Kabud-e Olya
- Cham Kabud-e Vosta
- Cham Kabud Rural District
