= Chahar Qaleh (disambiguation) =

Chahar Qaleh is a village in West Azerbaijan Province, Iran.

Chahar Qaleh and Chehar Qaleh (Persian: چهارقلعه) may also refer to:

- Chahar Qaleh-ye Barani
- Chahar Qaleh-ye Olya
- Chahar Qaleh-ye Sadat
- Chahar Qaleh-ye Sofla
- Chahar Qaleh-ye Vosta
