= Dalab-e Bala =

Dalab-e Bala دالاببالا
- Village
- Location within Iran
- Coordinates: 33°33′14″N 47°32′03″E
- Country: Iran
- Province: Lorestan
- County: Kuhdasht
- Bakhsh: Central
- Rural District: Kuhdasht-e Shomali

Population (2006)
  - Total: 61
- Time zone: UTC+3:30 (IRST)
  - Summer (DST): UTC+4:30 (IRDT)

Dalab-e Bala (Persian: دالاببالا, also Romanized as Dālāb-e Bālā; also known as Dālāb-e 'Olyā) is a village in Kuhdasht-e Shomali Rural District, in the Central District of Kuhdasht County, Lorestan province, Iran. At the 2006 census, its population was 61, in 10 families.
