= Zeq =

Zeq ذق
- Village
- Location within Iran
- Coordinates: 33°27′25″N 47°42′21″E
- Country: Iran
- Province: Lorestan
- County: Kuhdasht
- Bakhsh: Central
- Rural District: Kuhdasht-e Jonubi

Population (2006)
  - Total: 404
- Time zone: UTC+3:30 (IRST)
  - Summer (DST): UTC+4:30 (IRDT)

Zeq (Persian: ذق, also Romanized as Z̄eq; also known as Z̄eqq Zālyāb) is a village in Kuhdasht-e Jonubi Rural District, in the Central District of Kuhdasht County, Lorestan Province, Iran. At the 2006 census, its population was 404, in 75 families.
