= Cham-e Astan =

Cham-e Astan چم آستان
- Village
- Location within Iran
- Coordinates: 33°53′50″N 47°30′11″E
- Country: Iran
- Province: Lorestan
- County: Kuhdasht
- Bakhsh: Central
- Rural District: Kuhdasht-e Shomali

Population (2006)
  - Total: 156
- Time zone: UTC+3:30 (IRST)
  - Summer (DST): UTC+4:30 (IRDT)

Cham-e Astan (Persian: چم آستان, also Romanized as Cham-e Āstān; also known as Cham-e Āsīn) is a village in Kuhdasht-e Shomali Rural District, in the Central District of Kuhdasht County, Lorestan Province, Iran. At the 2006 census, its population was 156, in 32 families.
