= Sefid Qoleh Zaruni =

Sefid Qoleh Zaruni سفيد قله ضروني
- Village
- Country: Iran
- Province: Lorestan
- County: Kuhdasht
- Bakhsh: Central
- Rural District: Kuhdasht-e Shomali

Population (2006)
  - Total: 107
- Time zone: UTC+3:30 (IRST)
  - Summer (DST): UTC+4:30 (IRDT)

Sefid Qoleh Zaruni (Persian: سفيد قله ضروني, also Romanized as Sefīd Qoleh Ẕarūnī; also known as Morādʿal) is a village in Kuhdasht-e Shomali Rural District, in the Central District of Kuhdasht County, Lorestan Province, Iran. At the 2006 census, its population was 107, in 22 families.
