= Cheshmeh-ye Mirza Hoseyn =

Cheshmeh-ye Mirza Hoseyn چشمه ميرزاحسين
- Village
- Location within Iran
- Coordinates: 33°32′10″N 47°43′40″E
- Country: Iran
- Province: Lorestan
- County: Kuhdasht
- Bakhsh: Central
- Rural District: Kuhdasht-e Jonubi

Population (2006)
  - Total: 99
- Time zone: UTC+3:30 (IRST)
  - Summer (DST): UTC+4:30 (IRDT)

Cheshmeh-ye Mirza Hoseyn (Persian: چشمه ميرزاحسين, also Romanized as Cheshmeh-ye Mīrzā Ḩoseyn) is a village in Kuhdasht-e Jonubi Rural District, in the Central District of Kuhdasht County, Lorestan Province, Iran. At the 2006 census, its population was 99, in 19 families.
