= Qaleh Ochaq =

Qaleh Ochaq قلاچك
- Village
- Location within Iran
- Coordinates: 33°21′15″N 47°37′41″E
- Country: Iran
- Province: Lorestan
- County: Kuhdasht
- Bakhsh: Central
- Rural District: Gol Gol

Population (2006)
  - Total: 20
- Time zone: UTC+3:30 (IRST)
  - Summer (DST): UTC+4:30 (IRDT)

Qaleh Ochaq (Persian: قلاچك, also Romanized as Qal'eh Ochāq and Qal'eh Ojāq) is a village in Gol Gol Rural District, in the Central District of Kuhdasht County, Lorestan Province, Iran. At the 2006 census, its population was 20, in 4 families.
