= Siruleh Zarun =

Siruleh Zarun سيروله ضرون
- Village
- Location within Iran
- Coordinates: 33°45′28″N 47°35′05″E
- Country: Iran
- Province: Lorestan
- County: Kuhdasht
- Bakhsh: Central
- Rural District: Kuhdasht-e Shomali

Population (2006)
  - Total: 69
- Time zone: UTC+3:30 (IRST)
  - Summer (DST): UTC+4:30 (IRDT)

Siruleh Zarun (Persian: سيروله ضرون, also Romanized as Sīrūleh Ẕarūn) is a village in Kuhdasht-e Shomali Rural District, in the Central District of Kuhdasht County, Lorestan Province, Iran. At the 2006 census, its population was 69, in 12 families.
