= Cham Choqa =

Cham Choqa چمچقا
- Village
- Location within Iran
- Coordinates: 33°25′18″N 47°40′15″E
- Country: Iran
- Province: Lorestan
- County: Kuhdasht
- Bakhsh: Central
- Rural District: Kuhdasht-e Jonubi

Population (2006)
  - Total: 76
- Time zone: UTC+3:30 (IRST)
  - Summer (DST): UTC+4:30 (IRDT)

Cham Choqa (Persian: چمچقا, also romanized as Cham Choqā; also known as Cham Choghā-ye Rīkā) is a village in Kuhdasht-e Jonubi Rural District, in the Central District of Kuhdasht County, Lorestan Province, Iran. At the 2006 census its population was 76, in 18 families.
