= Cheshmeh Barani =

Cheshmeh Barani چشمه باراني
- Village
- Location within Iran
- Coordinates: 33°26′00″N 47°39′00″E
- Country: Iran
- Province: Lorestan
- County: Kuhdasht
- Bakhsh: Central
- Rural District: Kuhdasht-e Jonubi

Population (2006)
  - Total: 426
- Time zone: UTC+3:30 (IRST)
  - Summer (DST): UTC+4:30 (IRDT)

Cheshmeh Barani (Persian: چشمه باراني, also Romanized as Cheshmeh Bārānī; also known as Posht Bāgh-e Ẕarūnī) is a village in Kuhdasht-e Jonubi Rural District, in the Central District of Kuhdasht County, Lorestan Province, Iran. At the 2006 census, its population was 426, in 93 families.
