= Baba Qoli =

Baba Qoli باباقلي
- Village
- Location within Iran
- Coordinates: 33°31′03″N 47°36′54″E
- Country: Iran
- Province: Lorestan
- County: Kuhdasht
- Bakhsh: Central
- Rural District: Kuhdasht-e Jonubi

Population (2006)
  - Total: 422
- Time zone: UTC+3:30 (IRST)
  - Summer (DST): UTC+4:30 (IRDT)

Baba Qoli (Persian: باباقلي, also Romanized as Bābā Qolī) is a village in Kuhdasht-e Jonubi Rural District, in the Central District of Kuhdasht County, Lorestan Province, Iran. At the 2006 census, its population was 422, in 83 families.
