= Mina Parian =

Mina Parian ميناپريان
- Village
- Location within Iran
- Coordinates: 33°29′07″N 47°30′59″E
- Country: Iran
- Province: Lorestan
- County: Kuhdasht
- Bakhsh: Central
- Rural District: Gol Gol

Population (2006)
  - Total: 111
- Time zone: UTC+3:30 (IRST)
  - Summer (DST): UTC+4:30 (IRDT)

Mina Parian (Persian: ميناپريان, also Romanized as Mīnā Parīān; also known as Parīān-e Mīnā) is a village in Gol Gol Rural District, in the Central District of Kuhdasht County, Lorestan Province, Iran. At the 2006 census, its population was 111, in 26 families.
