= Seh Asiab =

Seh Asiab سه اسياب
- Village
- Location within Iran
- Coordinates: 33°29′10″N 47°37′26″E
- Country: Iran
- Province: Lorestan
- County: Kuhdasht
- Bakhsh: Central
- Rural District: Kuhdasht-e Jonubi

Population (2006)
  - Total: 236
- Time zone: UTC+3:30 (IRST)
  - Summer (DST): UTC+4:30 (IRDT)

Seh Asiab (Persian: سه اسياب, also Romanized as Seh Āsīāb; also known as Seh Āsīābeh) is a village in Kuhdasht-e Jonubi Rural District, in the Central District of Kuhdasht County, Lorestan Province, Iran. At the 2006 census, its population was 236, in 48 families.
