= Tang Qaleh =

Tang Qaleh تنگقلعه
- Village
- Location within Iran
- Coordinates: 33°35′43″N 47°38′47″E
- Country: Iran
- Province: Lorestan
- County: Kuhdasht
- Bakhsh: Central
- Rural District: Kuhdasht-e Jonubi

Population (2006)
  - Total: 70
- Time zone: UTC+3:30 (IRST)
  - Summer (DST): UTC+4:30 (IRDT)

Tang Qaleh (Persian: تنگقلعه, also Romanized as Tang Qal‘eh) is a village in Kuhdasht-e Jonubi Rural District, in the Central District of Kuhdasht County, Lorestan Province, Iran. During the 2006 census, its population was 70, in 11 families.
