= Dalab-e Pain =

Dalab-e Pain دالابپايين
- Village
- Location within Iran
- Coordinates: 33°31′16″N 47°32′03″E
- Country: Iran
- Province: Lorestan
- County: Kuhdasht
- Bakhsh: Central
- Rural District: Gol Gol

Population (2006)
  - Total: 186
- Time zone: UTC+3:30 (IRST)
  - Summer (DST): UTC+4:30 (IRDT)

Dalab-e Pain (Persian: دالابپايين, also Romanized as Dālāb-e Pā‘īn; also known as Dālāb-e Soflá and Dālāb) is a village in Gol Gol Rural District, in the Central District of Kuhdasht County, Lorestan province, Iran. At the 2006 census, its population was 186, in 38 families.
