= Zakhli Tireh =

Zakhli Tireh زخلي تيره
- Village
- Location within Iran
- Coordinates: 33°40′55″N 47°40′39″E
- Country: Iran
- Province: Lorestan
- County: Kuhdasht
- Bakhsh: Central
- Rural District: Kuhdasht-e Shomali

Population (2006)
  - Total: 26
- Time zone: UTC+3:30 (IRST)
  - Summer (DST): UTC+4:30 (IRDT)

Zakhli Tireh (Persian: زخلي تيره, also Romanized as Zakhlī Tīreh; also known as Mīrzā Raḥīm) is a village in Kuhdasht-e Shomali Rural District, in the Central District of Kuhdasht County, Lorestan Province, Iran. At the 2006 census, its population was 26, in 6 families.
