= Abchi =

Abchi اب چي
- Village
- Location within Iran
- Coordinates: 33°45′17″N 47°26′42″E
- Country: Iran
- Province: Lorestan
- County: Kuhdasht
- Bakhsh: Central
- Rural District: Kuhdasht-e Shomali

Population (2006)
  - Total: 108
- Time zone: UTC+3:30 (IRST)
  - Summer (DST): UTC+4:30 (IRDT)

Abchi (Persian: اب چي, also Romanized as Ābchī) is a village in Kuhdasht-e Shomali Rural District, in the Central District of Kuhdasht County, Lorestan Province, Iran. At the 2006 census, its population was 108, in 22 families.
