= Darazamstani Gadarkeh =

Darazamstani Gadarkeh درزمستاني گدارکه
- Village
- Country: Iran
- Province: Lorestan
- County: Kuhdasht
- Bakhsh: Central
- Rural District: Kuhdasht-e Shomali

Population (2006)
  - Total: 76
- Time zone: UTC+3:30 (IRST)
  - Summer (DST): UTC+4:30 (IRDT)

Darazamstani Gadarkeh (Persian: درزمستاني گدارکه, also Romanized as Darazamstānī Gadārkeh) is a village in Kuhdasht-e Shomali Rural District, in the Central District of Kuhdasht County, Lorestan Province, Iran. At the 2006 census, its population was 76, in 13 families.
