= Kal Gavrah =

Kal Gavrah كل گاوراه
- Village
- Location within Iran
- Coordinates: 33°35′17″N 47°39′59″E
- Country: Iran
- Province: Lorestan
- County: Kuhdasht
- Bakhsh: Central
- Rural District: Kuhdasht-e Jonubi

Population (2006)
  - Total: 143
- Time zone: UTC+3:30 (IRST)
  - Summer (DST): UTC+4:30 (IRDT)

Kal Gavrah (Persian: كل گاوراه, also Romanized as Kal Gāvrāh; also known as Kalleh Gāvrāh, Kalleh Gāvrā, Kalleh Gāv Rāh, Kala Gaurāh, Kala Gāvreh, Kal-e Gowrā, Kaleh Gāvar, and Kalgūrā) is a village in Kuhdasht-e Jonubi Rural District, in the Central District of Kuhdasht County, Lorestan Province, Iran. At the 2006 census, its population was 143, in 29 families.
