= Cheshmeh Dara =

Cheshmeh Dara چشمه دارا
- Village
- Location within Iran
- Coordinates: 33°39′12″N 47°37′10″E
- Country: Iran
- Province: Lorestan
- County: Kuhdasht
- Bakhsh: Central
- Rural District: Kuhdasht-e Shomali

Population (2006)
  - Total: 54
- Time zone: UTC+3:30 (IRST)
  - Summer (DST): UTC+4:30 (IRDT)

Cheshmeh Dara (Persian: چشمه دارا, also Romanized as Cheshmeh Dārā; also known as Sharif ʿAlī) is a village in Kuhdasht-e Shomali Rural District, in the Central District of Kuhdasht County, Lorestan Province, Iran. At the 2006 census, its population was 54, in 8 families.
