= Chiabaleh =

Chiabaleh چيابله
- Village
- Location within Iran
- Coordinates: 33°40′46″N 47°37′22″E
- Country: Iran
- Province: Lorestan
- County: Kuhdasht
- Bakhsh: Central
- Rural District: Kuhdasht-e Shomali

Population (2006)
  - Total: 104
- Time zone: UTC+3:30 (IRST)
  - Summer (DST): UTC+4:30 (IRDT)

Chiabaleh (Persian: چيابله, also Romanized as Chīābaleh; also known as Cheghābaleh) is a village in Kuhdasht-e Shomali Rural District, in the Central District of Kuhdasht County, Lorestan Province, Iran. At the 2006 census, its population was 104, in 18 families.
