= Darreh Khvoshi =

Darreh Khvoshi دره خوشي
- Village
- Location within Iran
- Coordinates: 33°41′56″N 47°34′24″E
- Country: Iran
- Province: Lorestan
- County: Kuhdasht
- Bakhsh: Central
- Rural District: Kuhdasht-e Shomali

Population (2006)
  - Total: 131
- Time zone: UTC+3:30 (IRST)
  - Summer (DST): UTC+4:30 (IRDT)

Darreh Khvoshi (Persian: دره خوشي, also Romanized as Darreh Khvoshī) is a village in Kuhdasht-e Shomali Rural District, in the Central District of Kuhdasht County, Lorestan Province, Iran. At the 2006 census, its population was 131, in 24 families.
