= Sar Rag =

Sar Rag سررگ
- Village
- Location within Iran
- Coordinates: 33°48′00″N 47°32′00″E
- Country: Iran
- Province: Lorestan
- County: Kuhdasht
- Bakhsh: Central
- Rural District: Kuhdasht-e Shomali

Population (2006)
  - Total: 34
- Time zone: UTC+3:30 (IRST)
  - Summer (DST): UTC+4:30 (IRDT)

Sar Rag (Persian: سررگ; also known as Seyyed Āḥmad Bag and Seyyed Aḩmad Beyg) is a village in Kuhdasht-e Shomali Rural District, in the Central District of Kuhdasht County, Lorestan Province, Iran. According to the 2006 census, its population was 34, in 5 families.
