= Azad Bakht-e Korreh Pa =

Azad Bakht-e Korreh Pa آزادبخت کره‌پا
- Village
- Location within Iran
- Coordinates: 33°31′03″N 47°36′54″E
- Country: Iran
- Province: Lorestan
- County: Kuhdasht
- Bakhsh: Central
- Rural District: Kuhdasht-e Jonubi

Population (2006)
  - Total: 422
- Time zone: UTC+3:30 (IRST)
  - Summer (DST): UTC+4:30 (IRDT)

Azad Bakht-e Korreh Pa (Persian: آزادبخت کره‌پا, also Romanized as Āzād Bakht-e Korreh Pā; also known as Āzād Bakht-e Korreh Pā-ye Owlīyā, Bābā Qolī-ye Āzādbakht, Āzād Bakht, and Bābā Qolī) is a village in Kuhdasht-e Jonubi Rural District, in the Central District of Kuhdasht County, Lorestan Province, Iran. At the 2006 census, its population was 422, in 87 families.
