= Qaleh-ye Dustan =

Qaleh-ye Dustan قلعه دوستان
- Village
- Location within Iran
- Coordinates: 33°42′24″N 47°33′54″E
- Country: Iran
- Province: Lorestan
- County: Kuhdasht
- Bakhsh: Central
- Rural District: Kuhdasht-e Shomali

Population (2006)
  - Total: 68
- Time zone: UTC+3:30 (IRST)
  - Summer (DST): UTC+4:30 (IRDT)

Qaleh-ye Dustan (Persian: قلعه دوستان, also Romanized as Qalʿeh-ye Dūstān; also known as Qalehdastan) is a village in Kuhdasht-e Shomali Rural District, in the Central District of Kuhdasht County, Lorestan Province, Iran. At the 2006 census, its population was 68, in 14 families.
