= Darsidgol =

Darsidgol دارسيدگل
- Village
- Location within Iran
- Coordinates: 33°45′52″N 47°34′40″E
- Country: Iran
- Province: Lorestan
- County: Kuhdasht
- Bakhsh: Central
- Rural District: Kuhdasht-e Shomali

Population (2006)
  - Total: 338
- Time zone: UTC+3:30 (IRST)
  - Summer (DST): UTC+4:30 (IRDT)

Darsidgol (Persian: دارسيدگل, also Romanized as Dārsīdgol; also known as ʿAlī Ḩoseynābād) is a village in Kuhdasht-e Shomali Rural District, in the Central District of Kuhdasht County, Lorestan Province, Iran. At the 2006 census, its population was 338, in 58 families.
