= Papol-e Madian Rud =

Papol-e Madian Rud پاپل ماديان رود
- Village
- Location within Iran
- Coordinates: 33°26′50″N 47°37′16″E
- Country: Iran
- Province: Lorestan
- County: Kuhdasht
- Bakhsh: Central
- Rural District: Kuhdasht-e Jonubi

Population (2006)
  - Total: 80
- Time zone: UTC+3:30 (IRST)
  - Summer (DST): UTC+4:30 (IRDT)

Papol-e Madian Rud (Persian: پاپل ماديان رود, also Romanized as Pāpol-e Mādīān Rūd; also known as Pāpol-e Mādīān and Pāpol) is a village in Kuhdasht-e Jonubi Rural District, in the Central District of Kuhdasht County, Lorestan Province, Iran. At the 2006 census, its population was 80, in 15 families.
