= Abduli Zalyab =

Abduli Zalyab عبدولي ذالياب
- Village
- Country: Iran
- Province: Lorestan
- County: Kuhdasht
- Bakhsh: Central
- Rural District: Kuhdasht-e Jonubi

Population (2006)
  - Total: 16
- Time zone: UTC+3:30 (IRST)
  - Summer (DST): UTC+4:30 (IRDT)

Abduli Zalyab (Persian: عبدولي ذالياب, also Romanized as ʿAbdūlī Zālyāb) is a village in Kuhdasht-e Jonubi Rural District, in the Central District of Kuhdasht County, Lorestan Province, Iran. At the 2006 census, its population was 16, in 4 families.
