= Posht Kyu Vareh Zard =

Posht Kyu Vareh Zard پشت کيو وره زرد
- Village
- Country: Iran
- Province: Lorestan
- County: Kuhdasht
- Bakhsh: Central
- Rural District: Kuhdasht-e Shomali

Population (2006)
  - Total: 35
- Time zone: UTC+3:30 (IRST)
  - Summer (DST): UTC+4:30 (IRDT)

Posht Kyu Vareh Zard (Persian: پشت کيو وره زرد, also Romanized as Posht Kyū Vareh Zard) is a village in Kuhdasht-e Shomali Rural District, in the Central District of Kuhdasht County, Lorestan Province, Iran. At the 2006 census, its population was 35, in 7 families.
