= Tang-e Darab-e Rika =

Tang-e Darab-e Rika تنگ داراب ريکا
- Village
- Location within Iran
- Coordinates: 33°25′03″N 47°40′47″E
- Country: Iran
- Province: Lorestan
- County: Kuhdasht
- Bakhsh: Central
- Rural District: Kuhdasht-e Jonubi

Population (2006)
  - Total: 448
- Time zone: UTC+3:30 (IRST)
  - Summer (DST): UTC+4:30 (IRDT)

Tang-e Darab-e Rika (Persian: تنگ داراب ريکا, also romanized as Tang-e Dārāb-e Rīkā; also known as Tang-e Dārā) is a village in Kuhdasht-e Jonubi Rural District, in the Central District of Kuhdasht County, Lorestan Province, Iran. At the 2006 census its population was 448, in 91 families.
