= Poshteh-ye Sari =

Poshteh-ye Sari پشته ساري
- Village
- Location within Iran
- Coordinates: 33°30′00″N 47°33′00″E
- Country: Iran
- Province: Lorestan
- County: Kuhdasht
- Bakhsh: Central
- Rural District: Gol Gol

Population (2006)
  - Total: 302
- Time zone: UTC+3:30 (IRST)
  - Summer (DST): UTC+4:30 (IRDT)

Poshteh-ye Sari (Persian: پشته ساري, also Romanized as Poshteh-ye Sārī) is a village in Gol Gol Rural District, in the Central District of Kuhdasht County, Lorestan Province, Iran. At the 2006 census, its population was 302, in 65 families.
