= Kamar Baleh =

Kamar Baleh كمربله
- Village
- Location within Iran
- Coordinates: 33°26′34″N 47°28′18″E
- Country: Iran
- Province: Lorestan
- County: Kuhdasht
- Bakhsh: Central
- Rural District: Gol Gol

Population (2006)
  - Total: 219
- Time zone: UTC+3:30 (IRST)
  - Summer (DST): UTC+4:30 (IRDT)

Kamar Baleh (Persian: كمربله, also known as Kamar Bag) is a village in Gol Gol Rural District, in the Central District of Kuhdasht County, Lorestan Province, Iran. At the 2006 census, its population was 219, in 42 families.
