= Kutuleh =

Kutuleh or Kotuleh (Persian: كوتولِه) may refer to:

- Kutuleh-ye Aziz Khan
- Kutuleh-ye Baba Karam
- Kutuleh-ye Hasan
