= Khadarhem Zeytun =

Khadarhem Zeytun خدارحم زيتون
- Village
- Country: Iran
- Province: Lorestan
- County: Kuhdasht
- Bakhsh: Central
- Rural District: Kuhdasht-e Shomali

Population (2006)
  - Total: 66
- Time zone: UTC+3:30 (IRST)
  - Summer (DST): UTC+4:30 (IRDT)

Khadarhem Zeytun (Persian: خدارحم زيتون, also Romanized as Khadārḥem Zeytūn) is a village in Kuhdasht-e Shomali Rural District, in the Central District of Kuhdasht County, Lorestan Province, Iran. At the 2006 census, its population was 66, in 14 families.
