= Parian-e Allah Morad =

Parian-e Allah Morad پريان الله مراد
- Village
- Location within Iran
- Coordinates: 33°29′06″N 47°31′17″E
- Country: Iran
- Province: Lorestan
- County: Kuhdasht
- Bakhsh: Central
- Rural District: Gol Gol

Population (2006)
  - Total: 487
- Time zone: UTC+3:30 (IRST)
  - Summer (DST): UTC+4:30 (IRDT)

Parian-e Allah Morad (Persian: پريان الله مراد, also Romanized as Parīān-e Allāh Morād) is a village in Gol Gol Rural District, in the Central District of Kuhdasht County, Lorestan Province, Iran. At the 2006 census, its population was 487, in 98 families.
