= Golagheh Mordeh =

Golagheh Mordeh گل اغه مرده
- Village
- Location within Iran
- Coordinates: 33°40′35″N 47°36′14″E
- Country: Iran
- Province: Lorestan
- County: Kuhdasht
- Bakhsh: Central
- Rural District: Kuhdasht-e Shomali

Population (2006)
  - Total: 118
- Time zone: UTC+3:30 (IRST)
  - Summer (DST): UTC+4:30 (IRDT)

Golagheh Mordeh (Persian: گل اغه مرده, also Romanized as Golāgheh Mordeh; also known as Golākhem Mordeh) is a village in Kuhdasht-e Shomali Rural District, in the Central District of Kuhdasht County, Lorestan Province, Iran. At the 2006 census, its population was 118, in 27 families.
