= Zaruni Hamat Beyg =

Zaruni Hamat Beyg ضروني همت بيگ
- Village
- Country: Iran
- Province: Lorestan
- County: Kuhdasht
- Bakhsh: Central
- Rural District: Gol Gol

Population (2006)
  - Total: 52
- Time zone: UTC+3:30 (IRST)
  - Summer (DST): UTC+4:30 (IRDT)

Zaruni Hamat Beyg (Persian: ضروني همت بيگ, also Romanized as Ẕarūnī Hamat Beyg) is a village in Gol Gol Rural District, in the Central District of Kuhdasht County, Lorestan Province, Iran. At the 2006 census, its population was 52, in 11 families.
