= Baneh, Lorestan =

Baneh بانه
- Village
- Location within Iran
- Coordinates: 33°44′04″N 47°31′56″E
- Country: Iran
- Province: Lorestan
- County: Kuhdasht
- Bakhsh: Central
- Rural District: Kuhdasht-e Shomali

Population (2006)
  - Total: 21
- Time zone: UTC+3:30 (IRST)
  - Summer (DST): UTC+4:30 (IRDT)

Baneh (Persian: بانه, also Romanized as Bāneh; also known as Bāneh-ye Bālā) is a village in Kuhdasht-e Shomali Rural District, in the Central District of Kuhdasht County, Lorestan Province, Iran. At the 2006 census, its population was 21, in 4 families.
