= Chiabaleh Pain =

Chiabaleh Pain چيابله پائين
- Village
- Country: Iran
- Province: Lorestan
- County: Kuhdasht
- Bakhsh: Central
- Rural District: Kuhdasht-e Shomali

Population (2006)
  - Total: 59
- Time zone: UTC+3:30 (IRST)
  - Summer (DST): UTC+4:30 (IRDT)

Chiabaleh Pain (Persian: چيابله پائين, also Romanized as Chīābaleh Pā’īn) is a village in Kuhdasht-e Shomali Rural District, in the Central District of Kuhdasht County, Lorestan province, Iran. At the 2006 census, its population was 59, in 11 families.
