= Namju =

Village in Lorestan province, Iran

Namju Persian: نامجو
- Village
- Location within Iran
- Coordinates: 33°41′47″N 47°28′08″E
- Country: Iran
- Province: Lorestan
- County: Kuhdasht
- District: Central
- Rural District: Kuhdasht-e Shomali

Population (2016)
  - Total: 442
- Time zone: UTC+3:30 (IRST)

Namju (Persian: نامجو) (Note: Also romanized as Nāmjū) is a village in, and the capital of, Kuhdasht-e Shomali Rural District in the Central District of Kuhdasht County, Lorestan province, Iran. The previous capital of the rural district was the village of Horin Khalifeh.

== Demographics ==
=== Population ===
At the time of the 2006 National Census, the village's population was 350 in 57 households. The following census in 2011 counted 363 people in 73 households. The 2016 census measured the population of the village as 442 people in 101 households.
