= Haft Cheshmeh, Kuhdasht =

Village in Lorestan province, Iran

Haft Cheshmeh Persian: هفتچشمه
- Village
- Location within Iran
- Coordinates: 33°25′42″N 47°33′43″E
- Country: Iran
- Province: Lorestan
- County: Kuhdasht
- District: Central
- Rural District: Gol Gol

Population (2016)
  - Total: 584
- Time zone: UTC+3:30 (IRST)

Haft Cheshmeh (Persian: هفتچشمه) is a village in Gol Gol Rural District of the Central District in Kuhdasht County, Lorestan province, Iran.

== Demographics ==
=== Population ===
At the time of the 2006 National Census, the village's population was 669 in 141 households. The following census in 2011 counted 642 people in 148 households. The 2016 census measured the population of the village as 584 people in 149 households.
