= Mian Maleh Abbasabad =

Village in Lorestan province, Iran

Mian Maleh Abbasabad Persian: ميان مله عباس آباد
- Village
- Location within Iran
- Coordinates: 33°42′15″N 47°27′28″E
- Country: Iran
- Province: Lorestan
- County: Kuhdasht
- District: Central
- Rural District: Kuhdasht-e Shomali

Population (2016)
  - Total: 304
- Time zone: UTC+3:30 (IRST)

Mian Maleh Abbasabad (Persian: ميان مله عباس آباد) (Note: Also romanized as Mīān Maleh ʿAbbāsābād; also known as Mīānmaleh ʿAbbāsābād Oladqobad) is a village in Kuhdasht-e Shomali Rural District of the Central District in Kuhdasht County, Lorestan province, Iran.

== Demographics ==
=== Population ===
At the time of the 2006 National Census, the village's population was 162 in 31 households. The following census in 2011 counted 277 people in 56 households. The 2016 census measured the population of the village as 304 people in 68 households.
