= Takiyeh Owlad Qobad =

Village in Lorestan province, Iran

Takiyeh Owlad Qobad Persian: تکيه اولاد قباد
- Village
- Location within Iran
- Coordinates: 33°42′25″N 47°27′59″E
- Country: Iran
- Province: Lorestan
- County: Kuhdasht
- District: Central
- Rural District: Kuhdasht-e Shomali

Population (2016)
  - Total: 384
- Time zone: UTC+3:30 (IRST)

Takiyeh Owlad Qobad (Persian: تکيه اولاد قباد) (Note: Also romanized as Takīyeh Owlād Qobād; also known as Takīyeh Olādqobād) is a village in Kuhdasht-e Shomali Rural District of the Central District in Kuhdasht County, Lorestan province, Iran.

== Demographics ==
=== Population ===
At the time of the 2006 National Census, the village's population was 281 in 53 households. The following census in 2011 counted 431 people in 98 households. The 2016 census measured the population of the village as 384 people in 95 households.
