= Sorkh Dom-e Laki =

Sorkh Dom-e Laki سرخ دم لکي
- Village
- Location within Iran
- Coordinates: 33°33′42″N 47°33′08″E
- Country: Iran
- Province: Lorestan
- County: Kuhdasht
- Bakhsh: Central
- Rural District: Kuhdasht-e Shomali

Population (2006)
  - Total: 90
- Time zone: UTC+3:30 (IRST)
  - Summer (DST): UTC+4:30 (IRDT)

Sorkh Dom-e Laki (Persian: سرخ دم لکي, also Romanized as Sorkh Dom-e Lakī; also known as Dom Sorkh Lakī) is a village in Kuhdasht-e Shomali Rural District, in the Central District of Kuhdasht County, Lorestan Province, Iran. At the 2006 census, its population was 90, in 16 families.
