= Kurdasht-e Olya =

Kurdasht-e Olya کوردشت عليا
- Village
- Location within Iran
- Coordinates: 33°43′39″N 47°24′12″E
- Country: Iran
- Province: Lorestan
- County: Kuhdasht
- Bakhsh: Central
- Rural District: Kuhdasht-e Shomali

Population (2006)
  - Total: 74
- Time zone: UTC+3:30 (IRST)
  - Summer (DST): UTC+4:30 (IRDT)

Kurdasht-e Olya (Persian: کوردشت عليا, also Romanized as Kūrdasht-e ‘Olyā and Kūreh Dasht-e ‘Olyā; also known as Kūrdasht and Kanī Sardeh) is a village in Kuhdasht-e Shomali Rural District, in the Central District of Kuhdasht County, Lorestan Province, Iran. At the 2006 census, its population was 74, in 14 families.
