= Ab Bariki =

Village in Lorestan province, Iran

Ab Bariki Persian: آب باريکي
- Village
- Location within Iran
- Coordinates: 33°31′26″N 47°39′02″E
- Country: Iran
- Province: Lorestan
- County: Kuhdasht
- District: Central
- Rural District: Kuhdasht-e Jonubi

Population (2016)
  - Total: 1,726
- Time zone: UTC+3:30 (IRST)

Ab Bariki (Persian: آب باريکي) (Note: Also romanized as Āb Bārīkī, Āb-e Bārīkī, and Āb-i-Bārīkī) is a village in Kuhdasht-e Jonubi Rural District of the Central District in Kuhdasht County, Lorestan province, Iran.

== Demographics ==
=== Population ===
At the time of the 2006 National Census, the village's population was 1,648 in 358 households. The following census in 2011 counted 1,870 people in 474 households. The 2016 census measured the population of the village as 1,726 people in 467 households.
