= Badarah-ye Sofla =

Badarah-ye Sofla بادره سفلي
- Village
- Location within Iran
- Coordinates: 33°44′03″N 47°31′57″E
- Country: Iran
- Province: Lorestan
- County: Kuhdasht
- Bakhsh: Central
- Rural District: Kuhdasht-e Shomali

Population (2006)
  - Total: 21
- Time zone: UTC+3:30 (IRST)
  - Summer (DST): UTC+4:30 (IRDT)

Badarah-ye Sofla (Persian: بادره سفلي, also Romanized as Bādarah-ye Soflá; also known as Bādarah) is a village in Kuhdasht-e Shomali Rural District, in the Central District of Kuhdasht County, Lorestan Province, Iran. At the 2006 census, its population was 21, in 4 families.
