= Cham Kabud-e Vosta =

Cham Kabud-e Vosta چمكبودوسطي
- Village
- Location within Iran
- Coordinates: 33°28′21″N 47°37′11″E
- Country: Iran
- Province: Lorestan
- County: Kuhdasht
- Bakhsh: Central
- Rural District: Kuhdasht-e Jonubi

Population (2006)
  - Total: 33
- Time zone: UTC+3:30 (IRST)
  - Summer (DST): UTC+4:30 (IRDT)

Cham Kabud-e Vosta (Persian: چمكبودوسطي, also Romanized as Cham Kabūd-e Vosţá) is a village in Kuhdasht-e Jonubi Rural District, in the Central District of Kuhdasht County, Lorestan Province, Iran. At the 2006 census, its population was 33, in 5 families.
