= Kutuleh-ye Baba Karam =

Kutuleh-ye Baba Karam كوتوله باباكرم
- Village
- Location within Iran
- Coordinates: 33°27′44″N 47°32′05″E
- Country: Iran
- Province: Lorestan
- County: Kuhdasht
- Bakhsh: Central
- Rural District: Gol Gol

Population (2006)
  - Total: 231
- Time zone: UTC+3:30 (IRST)
  - Summer (DST): UTC+4:30 (IRDT)

Kutuleh-ye Baba Karam (Persian: كوتوله باباكرم, also Romanized as Kūtūleh-ye Bābā Karam) is a village in Gol Gol Rural District, in the Central District of Kuhdasht County, Lorestan Province, Iran. At the 2006 census, its population was 231, in 51 families.
