= Chenar-e Pain, Kuhdasht =

Village in Lorestan province, Iran

Chenar-e Pain Persian: چنارپايين
- Village
- Location within Iran
- Coordinates: 33°30′33″N 47°36′18″E
- Country: Iran
- Province: Lorestan
- County: Kuhdasht
- District: Central
- Rural District: Kuhdasht-e Jonubi

Population (2016)
  - Total: 595
- Time zone: UTC+3:30 (IRST)

Chenar-e Pain (Persian: چنارپايين) (Note: Also romanized as Chenār-e Pā’īn; also known as Chenār Soflá Do, Chenār-e Soflá, Chenār-e Soflá Āzādbakht (چنارسفلي آزادبخت), and Chenāreh) is a village in Kuhdasht-e Jonubi Rural District of the Central District in Kuhdasht County, Lorestan province, Iran.

== Demographics ==
=== Population ===
At the time of the 2006 National Census, the village's population was 496 in 81 households. The following census in 2011 counted 528 people in 101 households. The 2016 census measured the population of the village as 595 people in 146 households.
