= Horin Khalifeh =

Village in Lorestan province, Iran

Horin Khalifeh Persian: هرين خليفه
- Village
- Location within Iran
- Coordinates: 33°34′53″N 47°32′45″E
- Country: Iran
- Province: Lorestan
- County: Kuhdasht
- District: Central
- Rural District: Kuhdasht-e Shomali

Population (2016)
  - Total: 426
- Time zone: UTC+3:30 (IRST)

Horin Khalifeh (Persian: هرين خليفه) (Note: Also romanized as Horīn Khalīfeh; also known as Hornī Khalīfeh and Khalīfeh) is a village in, and the former capital of, Kuhdasht-e Shomali Rural District in the Central District of Kuhdasht County, Lorestan province, Iran. The capital of the rural district has been transferred to the village of Namju.

== Demographics ==
=== Population ===
At the time of the 2006 National Census, the village's population was 329 in 81 households. The following census in 2011 counted 465 people in 107 households. The 2016 census measured the population of the village as 426 people in 109 households.
