= Seyyed Ahmad Shah =

Seyyed Ahmad Shah سيد احمد شاه
- Village
- Country: Iran
- Province: Lorestan
- County: Kuhdasht
- Bakhsh: Central
- Rural District: Kuhdasht-e Shomali

Population (2006)
  - Total: 124
- Time zone: UTC+3:30 (IRST)
  - Summer (DST): UTC+4:30 (IRDT)

Seyyed Ahmad Shah (Persian: سيد احمد شاه, also Romanized as Seyyed Āḥmad Shāh; also known as Cheshmeh Kabūd) is a village in Kuhdasht-e Shomali Rural District, in the Central District of Kuhdasht County, Lorestan Province, Iran. At the 2006 census, its population was 124, in 22 families.
