= Qasem Beygi =

Qasem Beygi قاسم بيگي
- Village
- Location within Iran
- Coordinates: 33°41′37″N 47°27′06″E
- Country: Iran
- Province: Lorestan
- County: Kuhdasht
- Bakhsh: Central
- Rural District: Kuhdasht-e Shomali

Population (2006)
  - Total: 70
- Time zone: UTC+3:30 (IRST)
  - Summer (DST): UTC+4:30 (IRDT)

Qasem Beygi (Persian: قاسم بيگي, also Romanized as Qāsem Beygī and Qāsem Begī; also known as ʿAlīdād) is a village in Kuhdasht-e Shomali Rural District, in the Central District of Kuhdasht County, Lorestan Province, Iran. At the 2006 census, its population was 70, in 13 families.
