= Alidad =

Alidad may refer to:

- Alidade, a measuring device
- Alidad, Khuzestan, a village in Iran
- Alidad, Lorestan, a village in Iran
