= Kamir Malmir =

Village in Lorestan province, Iran

Kamir Malmir Persian: کمير مالمير
- Village
- Location within Iran
- Coordinates: 33°30′50″N 47°32′33″E
- Country: Iran
- Province: Lorestan
- County: Kuhdasht
- District: Central
- Rural District: Gol Gol

Population (2016)
  - Total: 588
- Time zone: UTC+3:30 (IRST)

Kamir Malmir (Persian: کمير مالمير) (Note: Also romanized as Kamīr Mālmīr; also known as Komeyr and Kūh Mīr) is a village in Gol Gol Rural District of the Central District in Kuhdasht County, Lorestan province, Iran.

== Demographics ==
=== Population ===
At the time of the 2006 National Census, the village's population was 593 in 125 households. The following census in 2011 counted 634 people in 146 households. The 2016 census measured the population of the village as 588 people in 161 households.
