= Badarah =

Badarah (Persian: بادره) may refer to:

- Badarah-ye Olya, a village in Kuhdasht-e Shomali Rural District, Iran
- Badarah-ye Sofla, a village in Kuhdasht-e Shomali Rural District, Iran
