= Sorkvareh =

Village in Lorestan province, Iran

Sorkvareh Persian: سرکوره
- Village
- Location within Iran
- Coordinates: 33°42′13″N 47°28′15″E
- Country: Iran
- Province: Lorestan
- County: Kuhdasht
- District: Central
- Rural District: Kuhdasht-e Shomali

Population (2016)
  - Total: 260
- Time zone: UTC+3:30 (IRST)

Sorkvareh (Persian: سرکوره) (Note: Formerly known as Sorkvareh Owlad Qobad (سرکوره اولاد قباد), also romanized as Sorkvareh Owlād Qobād; also known as Sorkvareh Nūrkhodā (سرکوره نورخدا)) is a village in Kuhdasht-e Shomali Rural District of the Central District in Kuhdasht County, Lorestan province, Iran.

== Demographics ==
=== Population ===
At the time of the 2006 National Census, the village's population, as Sorkvareh Owlad Qobad, was 255 in 48 households. The following census in 2011 counted 302 people in 68 households, by which time the village was listed as Sorkvareh. The 2016 census measured the population of the village as 260 people in 59 households.
