= Kurdasht =

Kurdasht (Persian: کوردشت) may refer to:

- Kurdasht-e Olya
- Kurdasht-e Sofla
