= Fathallahabad =

Fathallahabad فتح اله آباد
- Village
- Location within Iran
- Coordinates: 33°44′09″N 47°24′42″E
- Country: Iran
- Province: Lorestan
- County: Kuhdasht
- Bakhsh: Central
- Rural District: Kuhdasht-e Shomali

Population (2006)
  - Total: 444
- Time zone: UTC+3:30 (IRST)
  - Summer (DST): UTC+4:30 (IRDT)

Fathallahabad (Persian: فتح اله آباد, also Romanized as Fatḥāllahābād; also known as Kūreh Dasht-e Soflá and Kūrdasht-e Soflá) is a village in Kuhdasht-e Shomali Rural District, in the Central District of Kuhdasht County, Lorestan Province, Iran. At the 2006 census, its population was 444, in 76 families.
