= Qabr-e Musa =

Village in Lorestan province, Iran

Qabr-e Musa Persian: قبرموسي
- Village
- Location within Iran
- Coordinates: 33°31′48″N 47°46′36″E
- Country: Iran
- Province: Lorestan
- County: Kuhdasht
- District: Central
- Rural District: Kuhdasht-e Jonubi

Population (2016)
  - Total: 696
- Time zone: UTC+3:30 (IRST)

Qabr-e Musa (Persian: قبرموسي) (Note: Also romanized as Qabr-e Mūsá) is a village in Kuhdasht-e Jonubi Rural District of the Central District in Kuhdasht County, Lorestan province, Iran.

== Demographics ==
=== Population ===
At the time of the 2006 National Census, the village's population was 698 in 150 households. The following census in 2011 counted 749 people in 177 households. The 2016 census measured the population of the village as 696 people in 181 households.
