= Avareh =

Avareh (Persian: اواره) may refer to:

- Avareh, Ilam
- Avareh, Lorestan
