= Jafarabad, Kuhdasht =

Village in Lorestan province, Iran

Jafarabad Persian: جعفرآباد
- Village
- Location within Iran
- Coordinates: 33°42′04″N 47°27′21″E
- Country: Iran
- Province: Lorestan
- County: Kuhdasht
- District: Central
- Rural District: Kuhdasht-e Shomali

Population (2016)
  - Total: 522
- Time zone: UTC+3:30 (IRST)

Jafarabad (Persian: جعفرآباد) (Note: Also romanized as Ja‘farābād; also known as Jafarkhan (جافرخان), also romanized as Jāfarkhān) is a village in Kuhdasht-e Shomali Rural District of the Central District in Kuhdasht County, Lorestan province, Iran.

== Demographics ==
=== Population ===
At the time of the 2006 National Census, the village's population was 346 in 65 households. The following census in 2011 counted 478 people in 97 households. The 2016 census measured the population of the village as 522 people in 112 households, the most populous in its rural district.
