= Eshtareh-ye Gol Gol =

Village in Lorestan province, Iran

Eshtareh-ye Gol Gol Persian: اشتره گل گل
- Village
- Location within Iran
- Coordinates: 33°27′40″N 47°27′04″E
- Country: Iran
- Province: Lorestan
- County: Kuhdasht
- District: Central
- Rural District: Gol Gol

Population (2016)
  - Total: 1,047
- Time zone: UTC+3:30 (IRST)

Eshtareh-ye Gol Gol (Persian: اشتره گل گل) (Note: Also known as 'Eshtoreh and Oshtoreh) is a village in, and the capital of, Gol Gol Rural District in the Central District of Kuhdasht County, Lorestan province, Iran. The previous capital of the rural district was the village of Sepideh-ye Gol Gol. (Note: Also known as Gol Gol-e Garavandi)

== Demographics ==
=== Population ===
At the time of the 2006 National Census, the village's population was 1,349 in 269 households. The following census in 2011 counted 1,355 people in 298 households. The 2016 census measured the population of the village as 1,047 people in 277 households.
