= Seyyed Saleh, Lorestan =

Village in Lorestan province, Iran

Seyyed Saleh Persian: سيدصالح
- Village
- Country: Iran
- Province: Lorestan
- County: Kuhdasht
- District: Central
- Rural District: Kuhdasht-e Shomali

Population (2016)
  - Total: 212
- Time zone: UTC+3:30 (IRST)

Seyyed Saleh (Persian: سيدصالح) (Note: Also romanized as Seyyed Şāleḩ; formerly known as Dul Qabarstan (دول قبرستان), also romanized as Dūl Qabarstān) is a village in Kuhdasht-e Shomali Rural District of the Central District in Kuhdasht County, Lorestan province, Iran.

== Demographics ==
=== Population ===
At the time of the 2006 National Census, the village's population, as Dul Qabarstan, was 374 in 62 households. The following census in 2011 counted 373 people in 74 households, by which time the village was listed as Seyyed Saleh. The 2016 census measured the population of the village as 212 people in 50 households.
