= Avareh, Lorestan =

Avareh اواره
- Village
- Location within Iran
- Coordinates: 33°27′06″N 47°30′42″E
- Country: Iran
- Province: Lorestan
- County: Kuhdasht
- Bakhsh: Central
- Rural District: Gol Gol

Population (2006)
  - Total: 64
- Time zone: UTC+3:30 (IRST)
  - Summer (DST): UTC+4:30 (IRDT)

Avareh (Persian: اواره, also Romanized as Āvāreh) is a village in Gol Gol Rural District, in the Central District of Kuhdasht County, Lorestan Province, Iran. At the 2006 census, its population was 64, in 10 families.
