= Kareh-ye Mian Rud-e Zaruni =

Kareh-ye Mian Rud-e Zaruni كره ميان رودضروني
- Village
- Location within Iran
- Coordinates: 33°26′16″N 47°38′29″E
- Country: Iran
- Province: Lorestan
- County: Kuhdasht
- Bakhsh: Central
- Rural District: Kuhdasht-e Jonubi

Population (2006)
  - Total: 121
- Time zone: UTC+3:30 (IRST)
  - Summer (DST): UTC+4:30 (IRDT)

Kareh-ye Mian Rud-e Zaruni (Persian: كره ميان رودضروني, also Romanized as Kareh-ye Mīān Rūd-e Ẕarūnī; also known as Kareh-ye Ẕarūnī and Korreh) is a village in Kuhdasht-e Jonubi Rural District, in the Central District of Kuhdasht County, Lorestan Province, Iran. At the 2006 census, its population was 121, in 23 families.
