= Kabudeh-ye Abu ol Vafa =

Village in Lorestan province, Iran

Kabudeh-ye Abu ol Vafa Persian: كبوده ابوالوفا
- Village
- Location within Iran
- Coordinates: 33°30′19″N 47°23′28″E
- Country: Iran
- Province: Lorestan
- County: Kuhdasht
- District: Central
- Rural District: Gol Gol

Population (2016)
  - Total: 685
- Time zone: UTC+3:30 (IRST)

Kabudeh-ye Abu ol Vafa (Persian: كبوده ابوالوفا) (Note: Also romanized as Kabūdeh-ye Abū ol Vafā; also known as Kabūd-e Abū ol Vafā, Kabudeh-ye Abu ol Vafai, and Kabūdeh-ye Abū ol Vafā'ī) is a village in Gol Gol Rural District of the Central District in Kuhdasht County, Lorestan province, Iran.

== Demographics ==
=== Population ===
At the time of the 2006 National Census, the village's population was 1,184 in 253 households. The following census in 2011 counted 1,076 people in 271 households. The 2016 census measured the population of the village as 685 people in 180 households.
