= Sarab-e Humian =

Village in Lorestan province, Iran

Sarab-e Humian Persian: سراب هوميان
- Village
- Location within Iran
- Coordinates: 33°40′26″N 47°35′12″E
- Country: Iran
- Province: Lorestan
- County: Kuhdasht
- District: Central
- Rural District: Kuhdasht-e Shomali

Population (2016)
  - Total: 198
- Time zone: UTC+3:30 (IRST)

Sarab-e Humian (Persian: سراب هوميان) (Note: Also romanized as Sarāb-e Hūmīān and Sarab-e Humiyan; also known as Shahrak Sarāb-e Hūmīān (شهرک سراب هوميان)) is a village in Kuhdasht-e Shomali Rural District of the Central District in Kuhdasht County, Lorestan province, Iran.

== Demographics ==
=== Population ===
At the time of the 2006 National Census, the village's population was 177 in 30 households. The following census in 2011 counted 150 people in 29 households. The 2016 census measured the population of the village as 198 people in 43 households.
