= Qoralivand =

Village in Lorestan province, Iran

Qoralivand Persian: قرعليوند
- Village
- Location within Iran
- Coordinates: 33°26′01″N 47°46′00″E
- Country: Iran
- Province: Lorestan
- County: Kuhdasht
- District: Central
- Rural District: Kuhdasht-e Jonubi

Population (2016)
  - Total: 1,979
- Time zone: UTC+3:30 (IRST)

Qoralivand (Persian: قرعليوند) (Note: Also romanized as Qorʿalīvand; formerly known as Chenar-e Dom Chehr Qoralivand (چناردم چهرقرعليوند), also romanized as Chenār-e Dom Chehr Qorʿalīvand; also known as Chenār Dom Chehr, Chenār-e Dom Chehr, Chenār-e Domcheh, Dom Chehr, and Dūmchehr) is a village in Kuhdasht-e Jonubi Rural District of the Central District in Kuhdasht County, Lorestan province, Iran.

== Demographics ==
=== Population ===
At the time of the 2006 National Census, the village's population, as Chenar-e Dom Chehr Qoralivand, was 2,230 in 440 households. The following census in 2011 counted 1,878 people in 399 households, by which time the village was listed as Qoralivand. The 2016 census measured the population of the village as 1,979 people in 546 households.
