= Kutuleh-ye Aziz Khan =

Kutuleh-ye Aziz Khan كوتوله عزيزخان
- Village
- Location within Iran
- Coordinates: 33°29′35″N 47°34′07″E
- Country: Iran
- Province: Lorestan
- County: Kuhdasht
- Bakhsh: Central
- Rural District: Gol Gol

Population (2006)
  - Total: 169
- Time zone: UTC+3:30 (IRST)
  - Summer (DST): UTC+4:30 (IRDT)

Kutuleh-ye Aziz Khan (Persian: كوتوله عزيزخان, also Romanized as Kūtūleh-ye ‘Azīz Khān; also known as Kūtūleh and Kotūleh) is a village in Gol Gol Rural District, in the Central District of Kuhdasht County, Lorestan Province, Iran. At the 2006 census, its population was 169, in 34 families.
