= Cham Kabud-e Olya =

Cham Kabud-e Olya چمكبودعليا
- Village
- Location within Iran
- Coordinates: 33°28′37″N 47°37′25″E
- Country: Iran
- Province: Lorestan
- County: Kuhdasht
- Bakhsh: Central
- Rural District: Kuhdasht-e Jonubi

Population (2006)
  - Total: 89
- Time zone: UTC+3:30 (IRST)
  - Summer (DST): UTC+4:30 (IRDT)

Cham Kabud-e Olya (Persian: چمكبودعليا, also Romanized as Cham Kabūd-e ‘Olyā; also known as Cham Kabūd-e Bālā) is a village in Kuhdasht-e Jonubi Rural District, in the Central District of Kuhdasht County, Lorestan Province, Iran. At the 2006 census, its population was 89, in 20 families.
