= Akbarabad, Kuhdasht =

Village in Lorestan province, Iran

Akbarabad Persian: اكبراباد
- Village
- Location within Iran
- Coordinates: 33°31′15″N 47°34′21″E
- Country: Iran
- Province: Lorestan
- County: Kuhdasht
- District: Central
- Rural District: Gol Gol

Population (2016)
  - Total: 1,641
- Time zone: UTC+3:30 (IRST)

Akbarabad (Persian: اكبراباد) (Note: Also romanized as Akbarābād) is a village in Gol Gol Rural District of the Central District in Kuhdasht County, Lorestan province, Iran.

== Demographics ==
=== Population ===
At the time of the 2006 National Census, the village's population was 820 in 159 households. The following census in 2011 counted 1,357 people in 329 households. The 2016 census measured the population of the village as 1,641 people in 440 households, the most populous in its rural district.
