= Davud Rashid =

Village in Lorestan province, Iran

Davud Rashid Persian: داودرشيد
- Village
- Location within Iran
- Coordinates: 33°33′27″N 47°41′36″E
- Country: Iran
- Province: Lorestan
- County: Kuhdasht
- District: Central
- Rural District: Kuhdasht-e Jonubi

Population (2016)
  - Total: 507
- Time zone: UTC+3:30 (IRST)

Davud Rashid (Persian: داودرشيد) (Note: Also romanized as Dāvūd Rashīd; also known as Dāvodrash, Dāvūd Rashīd Mīrīān, Dāyūrāsh, and Dāyvrāsh) is a village in Kuhdasht-e Jonubi Rural District of the Central District in Kuhdasht County, Lorestan province, Iran.

== Demographics ==
=== Population ===
At the time of the 2006 National Census, the village's population was 721 in 153 households. The following census in 2011 counted 610 people in 136 households. The 2016 census measured the population of the village as 507 people in 138 households.
