= Dom Sorkh Laki =

Dom Sorkh Laki (Persian: سُرخ دُمِ لَكی) may refer to:

- Sorkh Dom-e Khushnamvand
- Sorkh Dom-e Laki
