= Sepideh-ye Gol Gol =

Village in Lorestan province, Iran

Sepideh-ye Gol Gol Persian: سپيده گل گل
- Village
- Location within Iran
- Coordinates: 33°28′34″N 47°27′59″E
- Country: Iran
- Province: Lorestan
- County: Kuhdasht
- District: Central
- Rural District: Gol Gol

Population (2016)
  - Total: 955
- Time zone: UTC+3:30 (IRST)

Sepideh-ye Gol Gol (Persian: سپيده گل گل) (Note: Also romanized as Sepīdeh-ye Gol Gol; also known as Gol Gol, Gol Gol-e Garāvandī, Gulgul, and Sefīdeh-ye Gol Gol) is a village in, and the former capital of, Gol Gol Rural District in the Central District of Kuhdasht County, Lorestan province, Iran. The capital of the rural district has been transferred to the village of Eshtareh-ye Gol Gol.

== Demographics ==
=== Population ===
At the time of the 2006 National Census, the village's population was 1,048 in 201 households. The following census in 2011 counted 1,041 people in 248 households. The 2016 census measured the population of the village as 955 people in 255 households.
