= Chahar Qaleh-ye Vosta =

Chahar Qaleh-ye Vosta چهارقلعه وسطي
- Village
- Location within Iran
- Coordinates: 33°24′00″N 47°48′00″E
- Country: Iran
- Province: Lorestan
- County: Kuhdasht
- Bakhsh: Central
- Rural District: Kuhdasht-e Jonubi

Population (2006)
  - Total: 27
- Time zone: UTC+3:30 (IRST)
  - Summer (DST): UTC+4:30 (IRDT)

Chahar Qaleh-ye Vosta (Persian: چهارقلعه وسطي, also Romanized as Chahār Qal‘eh-ye Vosţá) is a village in Kuhdasht-e Jonubi Rural District, in the Central District of Kuhdasht County, Lorestan Province, Iran. At the 2006 census, its population was 27, in 4 families.
