= Kileh =

Village in Lorestan province, Iran

Kileh Persian: كيله
- Village
- Location within Iran
- Coordinates: 33°27′18″N 47°41′34″E
- Country: Iran
- Province: Lorestan
- County: Kuhdasht
- District: Central
- Rural District: Kuhdasht-e Jonubi

Population (2016)
  - Total: 780
- Time zone: UTC+3:30 (IRST)

Kileh (Persian: كيله) (Note: Also romanized as Kīleh) is a village in Kuhdasht-e Jonubi Rural District of the Central District in Kuhdasht County, Lorestan province, Iran.

== Demographics ==
=== Population ===
At the time of the 2006 National Census, the village's population was 878 in 165 households. The following census in 2011 counted 953 people in 217 households. The 2016 census measured the population of the village as 780 people in 201 households.
