= Hashem Beg =

Village in Lorestan province, Iran

Hashem Beg Persian: هاشم بگ
- Village
- Location within Iran
- Coordinates: 33°25′53″N 47°29′45″E
- Country: Iran
- Province: Lorestan
- County: Kuhdasht
- District: Central
- Rural District: Gol Gol

Population (2016)
  - Total: 854
- Time zone: UTC+3:30 (IRST)

Hashem Beg (Persian: هاشم بگ) (Note: Also romanized as Hāshem Beg; also known as Hāshem Bak and Hashem Beygī) is a village in Gol Gol Rural District of the Central District in Kuhdasht County, Lorestan province, Iran.

== Demographics ==
=== Population ===
At the time of the 2006 National Census, the village's population was 1,213 in 225 households. The following census in 2011 counted 958 people in 215 households. The 2016 census measured the population of the village as 854 people in 228 households.
