= Nileh, Lorestan =

Village in Lorestan province, Iran

Nileh Persian: نيله
- Village
- Location within Iran
- Coordinates: 33°56′11″N 47°31′34″E
- Country: Iran
- Province: Lorestan
- County: Kuhdasht
- District: Central
- Rural District: Kuhdasht-e Shomali

Population (2016)
  - Total: 204
- Time zone: UTC+3:30 (IRST)

Nileh (Persian: نيله) (Note: Also romanized as Neyleh and Nīleh) is a village in Kuhdasht-e Shomali Rural District of the Central District in Kuhdasht County, Lorestan province, Iran.

== Demographics ==
=== Population ===
At the time of the 2006 National Census, the village's population was 239 in 52 households. The following census in 2011 counted 212 people in 46 households. The 2016 census measured the population of the village as 204 people in 49 households.
