= Shahrak Emam Khomeyni, Lorestan =

In Lorestan Province, Shahrak Emam Khomeyni and Shahrak-e Emam Khomeyni (Persian: شهرك امام خميني) may refer to:

- Shahrak-e Emam Khomeyni, Delfan
- Shahrak Emam Khomeyni, Kuhdasht
