= Khushnamvand =

Village in Lorestan province, Iran

Khushnamvand Persian: خوشناموند
- Village
- Location within Iran
- Coordinates: 33°30′24″N 47°42′25″E
- Country: Iran
- Province: Lorestan
- County: Kuhdasht
- District: Central
- Rural District: Kuhdasht-e Jonubi

Population (2016)
  - Total: 1,826
- Time zone: UTC+3:30 (IRST)

Khushnamvand (Persian: خوشناموند) (Note: Also romanized as Khūshnāmvand, Khvosh Nāmvand, and Khvoshnāmvand; formerly known as Sorkh Dom-e Khushnamvand (سرخ دم خوشناموند), also romanized as Sorkh Dom-e Khūshnāmvand; also known as Dom Sorkh, and Dom Sorkh Lakī) is a village in, and the capital of, Kuhdasht-e Jonubi Rural District in the Central District of Kuhdasht County, Lorestan province, Iran.

== Demographics ==
=== Population ===
At the time of the 2006 National Census, the village's population, as Sorkh Dom-e Khushnamvand, was 2,148 in 452 households. The following census in 2011 counted 1,863 people in 456 households, by which time the village was listed as Khushnamvand. The 2016 census measured the population of the village as 1,826 people in 498 households.
