= Wafai =

"Wafai" or "Wafa'i" may refer to:

- a Sufi order, offshoot of the Suhrawardiyya order
- a Muslim name
  - 'Abd al-'Aziz al-Wafa'i
  - Muhammad Wafai
- a place in Iran, Abu ol Vafai
