= Cheshmeh Kabud, Delfan =

Cheshmeh Kabud, Delfan may refer to:

- Cheshmeh Kabud, Itivand-e Shomali
- Cheshmeh Kabud, Kakavand-e Sharqi
- Cheshmeh Kabud, Mirbag-e Shomali
