= Shahrak-e Emam Khomeyni, Kuhdasht =

Village in Lorestan province, Iran

Shahrak-e Emam Khomeyni Persian: شهرك امام خميني
- Village
- Location within Iran
- Coordinates: 33°31′11″N 47°36′18″E
- Country: Iran
- Province: Lorestan
- County: Kuhdasht
- District: Central
- Rural District: Kuhdasht-e Jonubi

Population (2016)
  - Total: 2,908
- Time zone: UTC+3:30 (IRST)

Shahrak-e Emam Khomeyni (Persian: شهرك امام خميني) (Note: Also romanized as Shahraḵ-e Emām Khomeynī) is a village in Kuhdasht-e Jonubi Rural District of the Central District in Kuhdasht County, Lorestan province, Iran.

== Demographics ==
=== Population ===
At the time of the 2006 National Census, the village's population was 768 in 165 households. The following census in 2011 counted 1,344 people in 348 households. The 2016 census measured the population of the village as 2,908 people in 878 households, the most populous in its rural district.
