= Nileh =

Nileh may refer to:

- Nileh, Lorestan
- Nir, Yazd
- Nileh Safid
