= Abu ol Vafa =

Village in Lorestan province, Iran

Abu ol Vafa Persian: ابوالوفا
- Village
- Location within Iran
- Coordinates: 33°29′58″N 47°24′35″E
- Country: Iran
- Province: Lorestan
- County: Kuhdasht
- District: Central
- Rural District: Gol Gol

Population (2016)
  - Total: 382
- Time zone: UTC+3:30 (IRST)

Abu ol Vafa (Persian: ابوالوفا) (Note: Also romanized as Abū ol Vafā; also known as Abolvafa’ī, Abu ol Vafai, Abū ol Vafā’ī, Abūl Wafaī, Gonbad-e Abū ol Vafā, and Gonbad-e Abū ol Vafā'ī) is a village in Gol Gol Rural District of the Central District in Kuhdasht County, Lorestan province, Iran.

== Demographics ==
=== Population ===
At the time of the 2006 National Census, the village's population was 411 in 100 households. The following census in 2011 counted 458 people in 112 households. The 2016 census measured the population of the village as 382 people in 111 households.
