= Korreh =

Korreh (Persian: کرّه) may refer to:

- Kareh-ye Mian Rud-e Zaruni
- Korehi
- Sar Korreh
