= Kuhdasht =

City in Lorestan province, Iran

Kuhdasht Persian: كوهدشت
- City
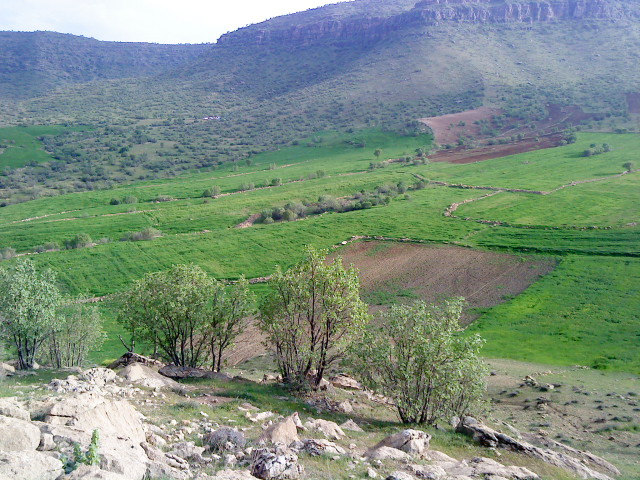
- Countryside near the city of Kuhdasht

- Location within Iran
- Coordinates: 33°31′46″N 47°36′33″E
- Country: Iran
- Province: Lorestan
- County: Kuhdasht
- District: Central

Population (2016)
  - Total: 89,091
- Time zone: UTC+3:30 (IRST)

Kuhdasht (Persian: كوهدشت) (Note: Also romanized as Kūhdasht and Kūh-ī-Dasht; Kurdish: کوێیەشت, romanized as Kwêyeşt) is a city in the Central District of Kuhdasht County, Lorestan province, Iran, serving as capital of both the county and the district.

== Demographics ==
=== Language and religion ===
The people of the city speak Laki Kurdish and are Shia Muslim.

=== Population ===
At the time of the 2006 National Census, the city's population was 85,519 in 58,087 households. The following census in 2011 counted 92,927 people in 22,819 households. The 2016 census measured the population of the city as 89,091 people in 24,347 households.

== Climate ==
Climate data for Kuhdasht
| Month | Jan | Feb | Mar | Apr | May | Jun | Jul | Aug | Sep | Oct | Nov | Dec | Year |
|---|---|---|---|---|---|---|---|---|---|---|---|---|---|
| Mean daily maximum °C (°F) | 8.2 (46.8) | 10.7 (51.3) | 15.6 (60.1) | 21.1 (70.0) | 27.4 (81.3) | 34.6 (94.3) | 38.5 (101.3) | 37.9 (100.2) | 33.8 (92.8) | 26.2 (79.2) | 17.8 (64.0) | 10.8 (51.4) | 23.6 (74.4) |
| Mean daily minimum °C (°F) | −3.0 (26.6) | −1.5 (29.3) | 2.4 (36.3) | 6.5 (43.7) | 10.1 (50.2) | 13.4 (56.1) | 17.6 (63.7) | 16.8 (62.2) | 12.1 (53.8) | 7.8 (46.0) | 3.0 (37.4) | −0.8 (30.6) | 7.0 (44.7) |
| Average precipitation mm (inches) | 73.8 (2.91) | 65.1 (2.56) | 81.6 (3.21) | 70 (2.8) | 35.7 (1.41) | 1.2 (0.05) | 0.7 (0.03) | 0.1 (0.00) | 0.4 (0.02) | 18.2 (0.72) | 48.6 (1.91) | 71.7 (2.82) | 467.1 (18.44) |
| Average snowfall cm (inches) | 15.6 (6.1) | 11.9 (4.7) | 5.7 (2.2) | 0.0 (0.0) | 0.0 (0.0) | 0.0 (0.0) | 0.0 (0.0) | 0.0 (0.0) | 0.0 (0.0) | 0.0 (0.0) | 0.1 (0.0) | 5.0 (2.0) | 38.3 (15) |
| Average rainy days | 8.9 | 7.9 | 11 | 11.1 | 5.3 | 0.4 | 0.6 | 0.1 | 0.5 | 5.1 | 7.5 | 7.7 | 66.1 |
| Average snowy days | 5.5 | 5.3 | 1.5 | 0 | 0 | 0 | 0 | 0 | 0 | 0 | 0.4 | 1.7 | 14.4 |
| Average relative humidity (%) | 71.8 | 66.9 | 58.7 | 53.1 | 43.4 | 25.6 | 21.4 | 21.8 | 24.1 | 37.7 | 56 | 68.5 | 45.8 |
| Average dew point °C (°F) | −2.0 (28.4) | −1.0 (30.2) | 1.3 (34.3) | 4.4 (39.9) | 6.0 (42.8) | 3.1 (37.6) | 3.9 (39.0) | 3.6 (38.5) | 1.3 (34.3) | 2.5 (36.5) | 2.0 (35.6) | −0.3 (31.5) | 2.1 (35.7) |
| Mean daily sunshine hours | 5.4 | 6.4 | 6.7 | 7.5 | 9.3 | 12.5 | 12.3 | 11.8 | 11.1 | 8.9 | 7 | 5.6 | 8.7 |
| Percentage possible sunshine | 49 | 53.9 | 52.2 | 54.4 | 63.2 | 81.7 | 81.4 | 82.4 | 84 | 72.9 | 61.6 | 51.5 | 65.7 |
| Average ultraviolet index | 2 | 3 | 3 | 5 | 6 | 7 | 7 | 7 | 5 | 4 | 3 | 2 | 5 |
Source: Weatherbase, Weather2visit(temperatures), Weather Atlas(snow-UV-rainy days)

== History ==
The oldest artifacts found in Kuhdasht by cultural heritage experts are from 15 to 17 thousand years ago in the Hamyan 2 Cave of Kuhdasht, which in some sources is more than 54,000 years old and is said to be 148,000 years old in oral history.

=== Mirmelas Cave ===
The second oldest monument in the city of Kuhdasht is the 17,000-year-old paintings of Mirmalas Cave. The signs obtained in the excavations and paleontological and archaeological studies of Mirmelas Cave indicate that 148,000 years of human habitation in this cave. These motifs are located in the north of Kuhdasht city. These paintings had a magical and magical role, and people usually created these motifs on the walls of caves and engraved their desires and aspirations, which were hunting, on the walls so that they might be able to access them better in the real world. In addition, by creating these motifs, which were important in their lives, they facilitated the hope of their abundance in the real world, the rock motifs of Mirmalas and Homian are among the unique works in the country, which shows the antiquity and antiquity of this region, the motifs of the Mirmalas valley begin with the role of an anchor ship, then the motifs of the fields are deer hunting individually and collectively. The number of them is 18 in the Mirmelas valley and 10 in Homian are designed and executed mainly in black and yellow. In Homion, there has been a deer and a hunter riding a horse with a bow and arrow in a beautiful and perfect way, and the passage of time has ruined a part of the rider and the hunting horse. These artifacts belong to the Paleolithic period.

=== Red-tailed Lucky Temple ===
The Paleolithic Red Tail Temple is located in the northern part of the Kuhdasht plain, 6 km from the city center, at the foot of Changari Mountain. The works in it show that the condition of the mountain has played a fundamental role in the selection of the place. So that the exposed fence is built according to the condition of the mountain and next to the precipices of the mountain, its defensive function is more clear. In addition to the fence, this area consists of the throne of the king and the residential houses, where the king dominates all parts of the fence. In this area, carved stones with the motif of a winged lion and the tree of life, as well as pieces of glazed pottery with a carving pattern under glaze belonging to the 7th and 8th centuries AH and pottery from the first millennium have been obtained. Archaeological excavations in this site began in 1998 and continue until now. In addition to a few pieces of stone with the motif of a winged lion, the objects are a piece of a clay coffin and a stone mortar, two small clay jars and a bronze brooch that have been recovered in archaeological excavations.

=== The Red Tail Temple ===
At a distance of 30 kilometers from the Surkh Dam Lakki area, on the slopes of Kor Shurab Mountain, there is a village called Sorkh Dam Lori, which was excavated during the years before the revolution. This ancient site (probably related to the 7th to 5th centuries BC) is related to the Bronze Age, which is registered in the list of national monuments of Iran with the number 3638.

=== Manijeh Kouhdasht Castle ===
On top of a peak of the Sarkhan mountain of Kuhdasht, the remains of a fortress remain. The length of the rampart of the castle of Manijeh Kuhdasht exceeds 100 meters, and in the northern part of it, the works of several rooms can be seen. The general level of the castle is close to 2,500 square meters. In the southern part of the rooms, there are traces of a large water tank whose wall has been painted. The way to enter the castle is only from the side of the valley that extends towards it. The importance of this castle lies in its dominance over the surrounding valleys and its striking range of view, which amazes viewers and tourists. Inside the castle, there is a strange and interesting cave whose opening has a steep slope of up to 10 meters to the east and south and is 15 meters deep. The roof of this hole is molded and arched with a kind of saruj, and at the end of the corridor is a well with a diameter of one meter, around which stone has been carved and its depth is 22 meters. But it does not have water. The coins obtained from this place date back to the Parthian period.

=== Aliabad Cave of Kuhdasht ===
This cave is located in the Kuhdasht region and was one of the settlements of prehistoric humans. The cave continues to a depth of 420 meters after a 6-meter descent. To fully visit this cave, complete technical equipment is required.

=== Kuhdasht Batkhaneh Cave ===
Bat Khaneh Cave is located on the western slope of Gardal Kuh located in the village of Chenar Dam Chehr Gharalivand.

=== The Thirty Steps Bridge of Kuhdasht ===
Si Peleh Bridge is located in the Sar Tarhan area of Kuhdasht city on the Seymareh River, between Lorestan and Ilam provinces. The bridge is located in the narrowest bed of the Seymareh River, in a place called Si Pelah, this bridge is located on the path of one of the ancient roads that connected Kermanshah, Ilam and Lorestan (Sartarhan). The mentioned bridge had 4 arch springs, but now only two of its arch springs remain. Each base is 5.6 meters wide and 17 meters long. The stones used in the foundation are 60× 60× 100 centimeters, and some are larger. A specific mark is carved on each of these stones. The materials of the building are made of plaster and stone. There is no mention of this bridge in the works of historians of the Islamic period. This bridge is one of the works of the Sassanid period and has been registered in the list of national monuments of Iran with the number 4511.

Hamdullah Mostofi, in his book Selected History, mentions Kuhdasht and Tahran that were destroyed centuries before the arrival of the Arabs.
