= Cheshmeh Kabud, Firuzabad =

Village in Kermanshah, Iran

Cheshmeh Kabud چشمه كبود
- Village
- Location within Iran
- Coordinates: 34°11′50″N 47°04′36″E
- Country: Iran
- Province: Kermanshah
- County: Kermanshah
- Bakhsh: Firuzabad
- Rural District: Sar Firuzabad

Population (2006)
  - Total: 23
- Time zone: UTC+3:30 (IRST)
  - Summer (DST): UTC+4:30 (IRDT)

Cheshmeh Kabud (Persian: چشمه كبود, also Romanized as Cheshmeh Kabūd) is a village in Sar Firuzabad Rural District, Firuzabad District, Kermanshah County, Kermanshah Province, Iran. At the 2006 census, its population was 23, in 6 families.
