= Cheshmeh Kabud, Gilan-e Gharb =

Village in Kermanshah, Iran

Cheshmeh Kabud چشمه کبود
- Village
- Location within Iran
- Coordinates: 33°59′12″N 46°14′36″E
- Country: Iran
- Province: Kermanshah
- County: Gilan-e Gharb
- Bakhsh: Central
- Rural District: Cheleh

Population (2006)
  - Total: 89
- Time zone: UTC+3:30 (IRST)
  - Summer (DST): UTC+4:30 (IRDT)

Cheshmeh Kabud (Persian: چشمه کبود, also Romanized as Cheshmeh Kabūd; also known as Cheshmeh Kabūd-e Rūtvand, Kānī Kabūd-e Rūtvand, and Rūtvand-e Ardeshīr) is a village in Cheleh Rural District, in the Central District of Gilan-e Gharb County, Kermanshah Province, Iran. At the 2006 census, its population was 89, in 18 families.
