= Cheshmeh Kabud, Kurdistan =

Cheshmeh Kabud چشمه كبود
- Village
- Location within Iran
- Coordinates: 34°48′24″N 47°05′39″E
- Country: Iran
- Province: Kurdistan
- County: Kamyaran
- Bakhsh: Central
- Rural District: Bilavar

Population (2006)
  - Total: 188
- Time zone: UTC+3:30 (IRST)
  - Summer (DST): UTC+4:30 (IRDT)

Cheshmeh Kabud (Persian: چشمه كبود, also Romanized as Cheshmeh Kabūd) is a village in Bilavar Rural District, in the Central District of Kamyaran County, Kurdistan Province, Iran. At the 2006 census, its population was 188, in 45 families. The village is populated by Kurds.
