= Avareh, Ilam =

Avareh اواره
- Village
- Location within Iran
- Coordinates: 33°46′53″N 46°10′15″E
- Country: Iran
- Province: Ilam
- County: Ilam
- Bakhsh: Chavar
- Rural District: Arkavazi

Population (2006)
  - Total: 23
- Time zone: UTC+3:30 (IRST)
  - Summer (DST): UTC+4:30 (IRDT)
- Climate: Csa

Avareh (Persian: اواره, also Romanized as Āvāreh) is a village in Arkavazi Rural District, Chavar District, Ilam County, Ilam Province, Iran. At the 2006 census, its population was 23, in 5 families. The village is populated by Kurds.
