= Cheshmeh Kabud-e Olya =

Village in Kermanshah, Iran

Cheshmeh Kabud-e Olya چشمه كبودعليا
- Village
- Location within Iran
- Coordinates: 33°53′23″N 47°03′59″E
- Country: Iran
- Province: Kermanshah
- County: Kermanshah
- Bakhsh: Firuzabad
- Rural District: Jalalvand

Population (2006)
  - Total: 42
- Time zone: UTC+3:30 (IRST)
  - Summer (DST): UTC+4:30 (IRDT)

Cheshmeh Kabud-e Olya (Persian: چشمه كبودعليا, also Romanized as Cheshmeh Kabūd-e 'Olyā; also known as Cheshmeh Kabūd-e Bālā) is a village in Jalalvand Rural District, Firuzabad District, Kermanshah County, Kermanshah province, Iran. At the 2006 census, its population was 42, in 11 families.
