= Cheshmeh Kabud, Bisotun =

Village in Kermanshah, Iran

Cheshmeh Kabud چشمه كبود
- Village
- Location within Iran
- Coordinates: 34°33′20″N 47°19′43″E
- Country: Iran
- Province: Kermanshah
- County: Harsin
- Bakhsh: Bisotun
- Rural District: Cham Chamal

Population (2006)
  - Total: 49
- Time zone: UTC+3:30 (IRST)
  - Summer (DST): UTC+4:30 (IRDT)

Cheshmeh Kabud (Persian: چشمه كبود, also Romanized as Cheshmeh Kabūd) is a village in Cham Chamal Rural District, Bisotun District, Harsin County, Kermanshah Province, Iran. At the 2006 census, its population was 49, in 8 families.
