= Cham Kabud, Hamadan =

Cham Kabud چمكبود
- Village
- Location within Iran
- Coordinates: 34°20′32″N 48°05′44″E
- Country: Iran
- Province: Hamadan
- County: Nahavand
- Bakhsh: Khezel
- Rural District: Khezel-e Sharqi

Population (2006)
  - Total: 195
- Time zone: UTC+3:30 (IRST)
  - Summer (DST): UTC+4:30 (IRDT)

Cham Kabud (Persian: چمكبود, also Romanized as Cham Kabūd) is a village in Khezel-e Sharqi Rural District, Khezel District, Nahavand County, Hamadan Province, Iran. At the 2006 census, its population was 195, in 54 families.
