= Cham Kabud, Sonqor =

Cham Kabud چم كبود
- Village
- Location within Iran
- Coordinates: 34°55′59″N 47°35′46″E
- Country: Iran
- Province: Kermanshah
- County: Sonqor
- Bakhsh: Central
- Rural District: Gavrud

Population (2006)
  - Total: 486
- Time zone: UTC+3:30 (IRST)
  - Summer (DST): UTC+4:30 (IRDT)

Cham Kabud (Persian: چم كبود, also Romanized as Cham Kabūd) is a village in Gavrud Rural District, in the Central District of Sonqor County, Kermanshah Province, Iran. At the 2006 census, its population was 486, in 119 families.
