= Cheshmeh Kabud-e Sofla =

Village in Kermanshah, Iran

Cheshmeh Kabud-e Sofla چشمه كبودسفلي
- Village
- Location within Iran
- Coordinates: 33°53′16″N 47°05′28″E
- Country: Iran
- Province: Kermanshah
- County: Kermanshah
- Bakhsh: Firuzabad
- Rural District: Jalalvand

Population (2006)
  - Total: 56
- Time zone: UTC+3:30 (IRST)
  - Summer (DST): UTC+4:30 (IRDT)

Cheshmeh Kabud-e Sofla (Persian: چشمه كبودسفلي, also Romanized as Cheshmeh Kabūd-e Soflá) is a village in Jalalvand Rural District, Firuzabad District, Kermanshah County, Kermanshah Province, Iran. At the 2006 census, its population was 56, in 7 families.
