= Cheshmeh Kabud, Kermanshah =

Village in Kermanshah, Iran

Cheshmeh Kabud چشمه كبود
- Village
- Location within Iran
- Coordinates: 34°42′58″N 46°58′04″E
- Country: Iran
- Province: Kermanshah
- County: Kermanshah
- Bakhsh: Central
- Rural District: Razavar

Population (2006)
  - Total: 657
- Time zone: UTC+3:30 (IRST)
  - Summer (DST): UTC+4:30 (IRDT)

Cheshmeh Kabud (Persian: چشمه كبود, also Romanized as Cheshmeh Kabūd) is a village in Razavar Rural District, in the Central District of Kermanshah County, Kermanshah Province, Iran. At the 2006 census, its population was 657, in 148 families.
