= Cheshmeh Kabud, Eslamabad-e Gharb =

Village in Kermanshah, Iran

Cheshmeh Kabud چشمه كبود
- Village
- Location within Iran
- Coordinates: 33°48′04″N 46°47′52″E
- Country: Iran
- Province: Kermanshah
- County: Eslamabad-e Gharb
- Bakhsh: Homeyl
- Rural District: Mansuri

Population (2006)
  - Total: 257
- Time zone: UTC+3:30 (IRST)
  - Summer (DST): UTC+4:30 (IRDT)

Cheshmeh Kabud (Persian: چشمه كبود, also Romanized as Cheshmeh Kabūd) is a village in Mansuri Rural District, Homeyl District, Eslamabad-e Gharb County, Kermanshah Province, Iran. At the 2006 census, its population was 257, in 61 families.
