= Cheshmeh Kabud, Ilam =

Village in Ilam, Iran

Cheshmeh Kabud چشمه كبود
- Village
- Location within Iran
- Coordinates: 33°34′24″N 46°24′18″E
- Country: Iran
- Province: Ilam
- County: Ilam
- Bakhsh: Central
- Rural District: Keshvari

Population (2006)
  - Total: 941
- Time zone: UTC+3:30 (IRST)
  - Summer (DST): UTC+4:30 (IRDT)

Cheshmeh Kabud (Persian: چشمه كبود, also Romanized as Cheshmeh Kabūd) is a village in Keshvari Rural District, in the Central District of Ilam County, Ilam Province, Iran. At the 2006 census, its population was 941, in 213 families. The village is populated by Kurds.
