= Cheshmeh Kabud, Nahavand =

Village in Hamadan, Iran

Cheshmeh Kabud چشمه كبود
- Village
- Location within Iran
- Coordinates: 34°11′53″N 48°24′03″E
- Country: Iran
- Province: Hamadan
- County: Nahavand
- Bakhsh: Central
- Rural District: Shaban

Population (2006)
  - Total: 25
- Time zone: UTC+3:30 (IRST)
  - Summer (DST): UTC+4:30 (IRDT)

Cheshmeh Kabud (Persian: چشمه كبود, also Romanized as Cheshmeh Kabūd; also known as Sahbāzābād, Shahbāzābād, and Shahvarābād) is a village in Shaban Rural District, in the Central District of Nahavand County, Hamadan Province, Iran. At the 2006 census, its population was 25, in 7 families.
