= Cheshmeh Kabud, Kakavand =

Cheshmeh Kabud چشمه كبود
- Village
- Location within Iran
- Coordinates: 34°15′46″N 47°49′00″E
- Country: Iran
- Province: Lorestan
- County: Delfan
- Bakhsh: Kakavand
- Rural District: Kakavand-e Sharqi

Population (2006)
  - Total: 82
- Time zone: UTC+3:30 (IRST)
  - Summer (DST): UTC+4:30 (IRDT)

Cheshmeh Kabud (Persian: چشمه كبود, also Romanized as Cheshmeh Kabūd) is a village in Kakavand-e Sharqi Rural District, Kakavand District, Delfan County, Lorestan Province, Iran. At the 2006 census, its population was 82, in 17 families.
