= Cheshmeh Kabud, Itivand =

Village in Lorestan province, Iran

Cheshmeh Kabud Persian: چشمه كبود
- Village
- Location within Iran
- Coordinates: 34°11′33″N 47°50′54″E
- Country: Iran
- Province: Lorestan
- County: Delfan
- District: Itivand
- Rural District: Itivand-e Shomali

Population (2016)
  - Total: 214
- Time zone: UTC+3:30 (IRST)

Cheshmeh Kabud (Persian: چشمه كبود) (Note: Also romanized as Chashmeh Kabūd and Cheshmeh Kabūd; also known as Chashma Kabud) is a village in Itivand-e Shomali Rural District of Itivand District in Delfan County, Lorestan province, Iran.

== Demographics ==
=== Population ===
At the time of the 2006 National Census, the village's population was 251 in 61 households, when it was in Kakavand District. The following census in 2011 counted 251 people in 63 households. The 2016 census measured the population of the village as 214 people in 65 households.

In 2022, the rural district was separated from the district in the formation of Itivand District.
