= Chenar-e Sofla, Kermanshah =

Village in Kermanshah, Iran

Kir Abad چنارسفلي
- Village
- Location within Iran
- Coordinates: 33°55′43″N 47°07′12″E
- Country: Iran
- Province: Kermanshah
- County: Kermanshah
- Bakhsh: Firuzabad
- Rural District: Jalalvand

Population (2006)
  - Total: 52
- Time zone: UTC+3:30 (IRST)
  - Summer (DST): UTC+4:30 (IRDT)

Chenar-e Sofla (Persian: چنارسفلي, also Romanized as Chenār-e Soflá; also known as Cham Kabūd-e Chenār, Chenār, Cheshmeh Kabūd Chenār, and Cheshmeh Kabūd-e Chenār) is a village in Jalalvand Rural District, Firuzabad District, Kermanshah County, Kermanshah Province, Iran. At the 2006 census, its population was 52, in 11 families.
