= Gol Gol Rural District =

Rural district in Lorestan province, Iran

Gol Gol Rural District Persian: دهستان گل گل
- Rural District
- Location within Iran
- Coordinates: 33°28′N 47°29′E
- Country: Iran
- Province: Lorestan
- County: Kuhdasht
- District: Central
- Established: 1987
- Capital: Eshtareh-ye Gol Gol

Population (2016)
  - Total: 11,235
- Time zone: UTC+3:30 (IRST)

Gol Gol Rural District (Persian: دهستان گل گل) is in the Central District of Kuhdasht County, Lorestan province, Iran. Its capital is the village of Eshtareh-ye Gol Gol. The previous capital of the rural district was the village of Sepideh-ye Gol Gol. (Note: Also known as Gol Gol-e Garavandi)

== Demographics ==
=== Population ===
At the time of the 2006 National Census, the rural district's population was 12,150 in 2,455 households. There were 12,704 inhabitants in 3,033 households at the following census of 2011. The 2016 census measured the population of the rural district as 11,235 in 3,033 households. The most populous of its 48 villages was Akbarabad, with 1,641 people.

=== Other villages in the rural district ===
- Abu ol Vafa
- Haft Cheshmeh
- Hashem Beg
- Kabudeh-ye Abu ol Vafa
- Kamir Malmir
- Shiravand Gandabeh
- Shiravand Naveh
