= Kuhdasht-e Jonubi Rural District =

Rural district in Lorestan province, Iran

Kuhdasht-e Jonubi Rural District Persian: دهستان کوهدشت جنوبی
- Rural District
- Location within Iran
- Coordinates: 33°29′N 47°42′E
- Country: Iran
- Province: Lorestan
- County: Kuhdasht
- District: Central
- Established: 1987
- Capital: Khushnamvand

Population (2016)
  - Total: 16,907
- Time zone: UTC+3:30 (IRST)

Kuhdasht-e Jonubi Rural District (Persian: دهستان کوهدشت جنوبی) is in the Central District of Kuhdasht County, Lorestan province, Iran. Its capital is the village of Khushnamvand.

== Demographics ==
=== Population ===
At the time of the 2006 National Census, the rural district's population was 16,923 in 3,445 households. There were 16,981 inhabitants in 3,989 households at the following census of 2011. The 2016 census measured the population of the rural district as 16,907 in 4,623 households. The most populous of its 56 villages was Shahrak-e Emam Khomeyni, with 2,908 people.

=== Other villages in the rural district ===
- Ab Bariki
- Chenar-e Pain
- Davud Rashid
- Kileh
- Qabr-e Musa
- Qoralivand
