= Kuhdasht-e Shomali Rural District =

Rural district in Lorestan province, Iran

Kuhdasht-e Shomali Rural District Persian: دهستان کوهدشت شمالی
- Rural District
- Location within Iran
- Coordinates: 33°44′N 47°31′E
- Country: Iran
- Province: Lorestan
- County: Kuhdasht
- District: Central
- Established: 1987
- Capital: Namju

Population (2016)
  - Total: 6,782
- Time zone: UTC+3:30 (IRST)

Kuhdasht-e Shomali Rural District (Persian: دهستان کوهدشت شمالی) is in the Central District of Kuhdasht County, Lorestan province, Iran. Its capital is the village of Namju. The previous capital of the rural district was the village of Horin Khalifeh.

== Demographics ==
=== Population ===
At the time of the 2006 National Census, the rural district's population was 7,183 in 1,377 households. There were 7,287 inhabitants in 1,519 households at the following census of 2011. The 2016 census measured the population of the rural district as 6,782 in 1,569 households. The most populous of its 81 villages was Jafarabad, with 522 people.

=== Other villages in the rural district ===
- Mian Maleh Abbasabad
- Nileh
- Sarab-e Humian
- Seyyed Saleh
- Sorkvareh
- Takiyeh Owlad Qobad
