= Kuhdasht County =

County in Lorestan province, Iran

Kuhdasht County Persian: شهرستان کوهدشت
- County
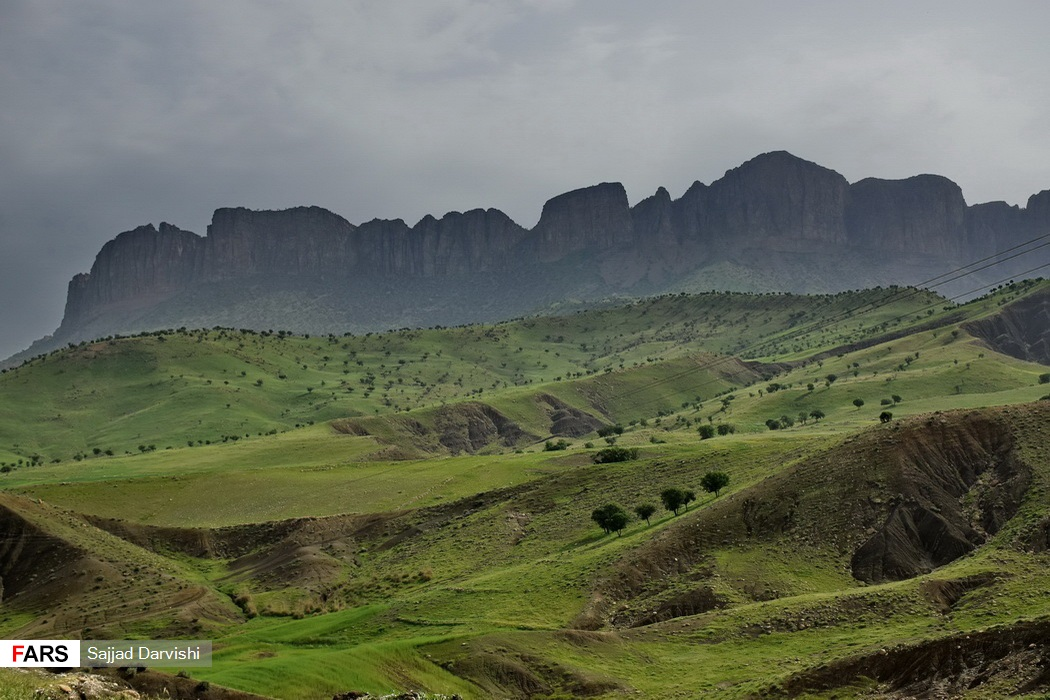
- Shiraz Valley in Kuhdasht County

- Location of Kuhdasht County in Lorestan province (left, pink)

- Location of Lorestan province in Iran
- Coordinates: 33°38′N 47°21′E
- Country: Iran
- Province: Lorestan
- Established: 1989
- Capital: Kuhdasht
- Districts: Central, Darb-e Gonbad, Kuhnani, Tarhan

Population (2016)
  - Total: 166,658
- Time zone: UTC+3:30 (IRST)

Kuhdasht County (Persian: شهرستان کوهدشت) is in Lorestan province, Iran. Its capital is the city of Kuhdasht.

== History ==
In 2013, Rumeshkan District was separated from the county in the establishment of Rumeshkan County.

== Demographics ==
=== Population ===
At the time of the 2006 National Census, the county's population was 209,821 in 43,159 households. The following census in 2011 counted 218,921 people in 52,799 households. The 2016 census measured the population of the county as 166,658 in 45,155 households.

=== Administrative divisions ===
Kuhdasht County's population history and administrative structure over three consecutive censuses are shown in the following table.

Kuhdasht County Population
Administrative Divisions	2006	2011	2016
Central District	121,775	129,899	124,015
Gol Gol RD	12,150	12,704	11,235
Kuhdasht-e Jonubi RD	16,923	16,981	16,907
Kuhdasht-e Shomali RD	7,183	7,287	6,782
Kuhdasht (city)	85,519	92,927	89,091
Darb-e Gonbad District	13,017	12,662	10,621
Boluran RD	5,012	4,650	3,082
Darb-e Gonbad RD	5,886	5,821	5,408
Darb-e Gonbad (city)	2,119	2,191	2,131
Kuhnani District (Note: Formerly Kunani District)	21,786	21,433	19,292
Kuhnani RD (Note: Formerly Kunani Rural District)	11,596	7,160	6,665
Zirtang RD (Note: Formerly Rumeshkan-e Gharbi Rural District)	6,444	6,031	4,859
Kuhnani (city) (Note: Formerly Kunani)	3,746	8,242	7,768
Rumeshkan District (Note: Transferred to Rumeshkan County)	35,595	38,701	
Rumeshkan-e Gharbi RD (Note: Renamed Suri Rural District)	11,376	11,938	
Rumeshkan-e Sharqi RD (Note: Renamed Rumeshkan Rural District)	19,418	21,587	
Chaqabol (city)	4,801	5,176	
Tarhan District	17,648	16,101	12,730
Tarhan-e Gharbi RD	8,847	7,807	5,526
Tarhan-e Sharqi RD (Note: Formerly Tarhan Rural District)	5,531	5,094	3,909
Garab (city)	3,270	3,200	3,295
Total	209,821	218,921	166,658
RD = Rural District

== See also ==
Media related to Kuhdasht County at Wikimedia Commons
