= Central District (Kuhdasht County) =

District in Lorestan province, Iran

Central District (Kuhdasht County) Persian: بخش مرکزی شهرستان کوهدشت
- District
- Location within Iran
- Coordinates: 33°38′N 47°34′E
- Country: Iran
- Province: Lorestan
- County: Kuhdasht
- Established: 1989
- Capital: Kuhdasht

Population (2016)
  - Total: 124,015
- Time zone: UTC+3:30 (IRST)

The Central District of Kuhdasht County (Persian: بخش مرکزی شهرستان کوهدشت) is in Lorestan province, Iran. Its capital is the city of Kuhdasht.

== Demographics ==
=== Population ===
At the time of the 2006 National Census, the district's population was 121,775 in 25,364 households. The following census in 2011 counted 129,899 people in 31,360 households. The 2016 census measured the population of the district as 124,015 inhabitants in 33,572 households.

=== Administrative divisions ===
Central District (Kuhdasht County) Population
Administrative Divisions	2006	2011	2016
Gol Gol RD	12,150	12,704	11,235
Kuhdasht-e Jonubi RD	16,923	16,981	16,907
Kuhdasht-e Shomali RD	7,183	7,287	6,782
Kuhdasht (city)	85,519	92,927	89,091
Total	121,775	129,899	124,015
RD = Rural District
