= Sukhur =

Sukhur (Persian: سوخور) may refer to:

- Sukhur-e Ali Mohammad-e Gol Mohammadi
- Sukhur-e Allahi
- Sukhur-e Hajji Morad
- Sukhur-e Karmi
- Sukhur-e Khush Aqbal
- Sukhur-e Kohzad
- Sukhur-e Morovvati
- Sukhur-e Namdar-e Abdi
- Sukhur-e Namdar-e Mirzapur
- Sukhur-e Rashid-e Olya
- Sukhur-e Rashid-e Sofla
- Sukhur-e Shahbaz-e Najafi
- Sukhur-e Shahbaz-e Shiri

== See also ==
- Sukkur
