= Shurabeh =

Shurabeh (Persian: شورابه) may refer to:

== Ilam Province ==
- Shurabeh-ye Malek, Ilam Province
- Shurabeh-ye Marate, Ilam Province

== Isfahan Province ==
- Shurabeh, Isfahan, a village in Ardestan County

== Kermanshah Province ==
- Shurabeh, Kuzaran, a village in Kermahshah County

== Lorestan Province ==
- Shurabad, Lorestan
- Shurabeh-ye Karim Khan, Lorestan Province
- Shurabeh-ye Sofla Do, Lorestan Province
- Shurabeh-ye Sofla Yek, Lorestan Province
- Shurabeh-ye Vosta, Lorestan Province
- Shurabeh-ye Vosta Shahmorad, Lorestan Province
