= Baskeleh =

Baskeleh (Persian: باسكله) may refer to:

- Baskeleh-ye Boruvim
- Baskeleh-ye Cheshmeh Sefid
- Baskeleh-ye Dar Anbar
- Baskeleh-ye Garmeh
- Baskeleh-ye Khan Mirza
- Baskeleh-ye Vasat
