= Chal-e Siyah =

Chal-e Siyah or Chal Siah (Persian: چال سياه) may refer to:

- Chal Siah, Kermanshah Province
- Chal-e Siyah Gelal, Kohgiluyeh and Boyer-Ahmad Province
- Chal Siah Manchatun Jowkar, Kohgiluyeh and Boyer-Ahmad Province
- Chal Siah, Mazandaran

== See also ==
- Chaleh Siah (disambiguation)
