= Qoli Qoli =

Qoli Qoli قلي قلي
- Village
- Location within Iran
- Coordinates: 34°12′56″N 46°03′24″E
- Country: Iran
- Province: Kermanshah
- County: Gilan-e Gharb
- Bakhsh: Govar
- Rural District: Heydariyeh

Population (2006)
  - Total: 728
- Time zone: UTC+3:30 (IRST)
  - Summer (DST): UTC+4:30 (IRDT)

Qoli Qoli (Persian: قلي قلي, also Romanized as Qolī Qolī) is a village in Heydariyeh Rural District, Govar District, Gilan-e Gharb County, Kermanshah Province, Iran. At the 2006 census, its population was 728, in 147 families.
