= Dar Badam =

Dar Badam داربادام
- Village
- Location within Iran
- Coordinates: 34°01′42″N 46°24′00″E
- Country: Iran
- Province: Kermanshah
- County: Gilan-e Gharb
- Bakhsh: Govar
- Rural District: Gowavar

Population (2006)
  - Total: 342
- Time zone: UTC+3:30 (IRST)
  - Summer (DST): UTC+4:30 (IRDT)

Dar Badam (Persian: داربادام, also Romanized as Dār Bādām; also known as Dār Bādām-e 'Olyā) is a village in Gowavar Rural District, Govar District, Gilan-e Gharb County, Kermanshah province, Iran. At the 2006 census, its population was 342, in 73 families.
