= Cheshmeh Isa =

Cheshmeh Isa چشمه عيسي
- Village
- Location within Iran
- Coordinates: 33°53′45″N 46°32′50″E
- Country: Iran
- Province: Kermanshah
- County: Gilan-e Gharb
- Bakhsh: Govar
- Rural District: Gowavar

Population (2006)
  - Total: 88
- Time zone: UTC+3:30 (IRST)
  - Summer (DST): UTC+4:30 (IRDT)

Cheshmeh Isa (Persian: چشمه عيسي, also Romanized as Cheshmeh 'Īsá) is a village in Gowavar Rural District, Govar District, Gilan-e Gharb County, Kermanshah province, Iran. At the 2006 census, its population was 88, in 19 families.
