= Karkul-e Kasan =

Karkul-e Kasan كركول كسان
- Village
- Location within Iran
- Coordinates: 33°59′09″N 46°25′12″E
- Country: Iran
- Province: Kermanshah
- County: Gilan-e Gharb
- Bakhsh: Govar
- Rural District: Gowavar

Population (2006)
  - Total: 291
- Time zone: UTC+3:30 (IRST)
  - Summer (DST): UTC+4:30 (IRDT)

Karkul-e Kasan (Persian: كركول كسان, also Romanized as Karkūl-e Kasān; also known as Karkūl and Korkūl) is a village in Gowavar Rural District, Govar District, Gilan-e Gharb County, Kermanshah Province, Iran. At the 2006 census, its population was 291, in 60 families.
