= Garmab-e Mohammad Rezavandi =

Coordinates: 34°05′58″N 46°15′06″E

Garmab-e Mohammad Rezavandi گرماب محمدرضاوندي
- Village
- Interactive map of Garmab-e Mohammad Rezavandi
- Country: Iran
- Province: Kermanshah
- County: Gilan-e Gharb
- Bakhsh: Govar
- Rural District: Gowavar

Population (2006)
  - Total: 210
- Time zone: UTC+3:30 (IRST)
  - Summer (DST): UTC+4:30 (IRDT)

Garmab-e Mohammad Rezavandi (Persian: گرماب محمدرضاوندي, also Romanized as Garmāb-e Moḩammad Rez̤āvandī) is a village in Gowavar Rural District, Govar District, Gilan-e Gharb County, Kermanshah Province, Iran. At the 2006 census, its population was 210, in 48 families.
