= Bapir-e Sofla =

Bapir-e Sofla باپيرسفلي
- Village
- Country: Iran
- Province: Kermanshah
- County: Gilan-e Gharb
- Bakhsh: Govar
- Rural District: Gowavar

Population (2006)
  - Total: 34
- Time zone: UTC+3:30 (IRST)
  - Summer (DST): UTC+4:30 (IRDT)

Bapir-e Sofla (Persian: باپيرسفلي, also Romanized as Bāpīr-e Soflá) is a village in Gowavar Rural District, Govar District, Gilan-e Gharb County, Kermanshah Province, Iran. At the 2006 census, its population was 34, in 9 families.
