= Beyg Rezai =

Beyg Rezai بيگ رضائي
- Village
- Location within Iran
- Coordinates: 34°02′39″N 46°25′21″E
- Country: Iran
- Province: Kermanshah
- County: Gilan-e Gharb
- Bakhsh: Govar
- Rural District: Gowavar

Population (2006)
  - Total: 643
- Time zone: UTC+3:30 (IRST)
  - Summer (DST): UTC+4:30 (IRDT)

Beyg Rezai (Persian: بيگ رضائي, also Romanized as Beyg Reẕā’ī; also known as Şeyed Ayāz-e Beyg Reẕā'ī) is a village in Gowavar Rural District, Govar District, Gilan-e Gharb County, Kermanshah Province, Iran. At the 2006 census, its population was 643, in 143 families.
