= Bahram Vand =

Bahram Vand بهرام وند
- Village
- Location within Iran
- Coordinates: 34°11′49″N 46°05′12″E
- Country: Iran
- Province: Kermanshah
- County: Gilan-e Gharb
- Bakhsh: Govar
- Rural District: Heydariyeh

Population (2006)
  - Total: 322
- Time zone: UTC+3:30 (IRST)
  - Summer (DST): UTC+4:30 (IRDT)

Bahram Vand (Persian: بهرام وند, also Romanized as Bahrām Vand; also known as Bahrāmvandī and Bahrām Vandī) is a village in Heydariyeh Rural District, Govar District, Gilan-e Gharb County, Kermanshah Province, Iran. At the 2006 census, its population was 322, in 66 families.
