= Haft Cheshmeh-ye Jahanshah =

Haft Cheshmeh-ye Jahanshah هفت چشمه جهانشاه
- Village
- Location within Iran
- Coordinates: 33°59′20″N 46°23′59″E
- Country: Iran
- Province: Kermanshah
- County: Gilan-e Gharb
- Bakhsh: Govar
- Rural District: Gowavar

Population (2006)
  - Total: 170
- Time zone: UTC+3:30 (IRST)
  - Summer (DST): UTC+4:30 (IRDT)

Haft Cheshmeh-ye Jahanshah (Persian: هفت چشمه جهانشاه, also Romanized as Haft Cheshmeh-ye Jahānshāh; also known as Jahānshāh) is a village in Gowavar Rural District, Govar District, Gilan-e Gharb County, Kermanshah Province, Iran. At the 2006 census, its population was 170, in 38 families.

The terrain surrounding Jahānshāh is generally hilly, though the immediate vicinity is flat. The highest point in the area has an elevation of 2,007 meters and is located 3.2 km northeast of Jahānshāh. With a population density of approximately 39 people per square kilometer, the area around Jahānshāh is relatively sparsely populated.
