= Cheshmeh Gholami =

Cheshmeh Gholami چشمه غلامي
- Village
- Location within Iran
- Coordinates: 34°00′20″N 46°21′35″E
- Country: Iran
- Province: Kermanshah
- County: Gilan-e Gharb
- Bakhsh: Govar
- Rural District: Gowavar

Population (2006)
  - Total: 474
- Time zone: UTC+3:30 (IRST)
  - Summer (DST): UTC+4:30 (IRDT)

Cheshmeh Gholami (Persian: چشمه غلامي, also Romanized as Cheshmeh Gholāmī) is a village in Gowavar Rural District, Govar District, Gilan-e Gharb County, Kermanshah Province, Iran. At the 2006 census, its population was 474, in 109 families.
