= Sheykh Jabrail =

Sheykh Jabrail شيخ جبرئيل
- Village
- Location within Iran
- Coordinates: 33°52′48″N 46°35′58″E
- Country: Iran
- Province: Kermanshah
- County: Gilan-e Gharb
- Bakhsh: Govar
- Rural District: Gowavar

Population (2006)
  - Total: 106
- Time zone: UTC+3:30 (IRST)
  - Summer (DST): UTC+4:30 (IRDT)

Sheykh Jabrail (Persian: شيخ جبرئيل, also Romanized as Sheykh Jabra’īl and Sheykh Jabr’īl; also known as Chekān-e Mansūrī, Shaikh Jarwāil, and Sheykh Jarvā’īl) is a village in Gowavar Rural District, Govar District, Gilan-e Gharb County, Kermanshah Province, Iran. At the 2006 census, its population was 106, in 24 families.
