= Cheshmeh Jadar =

Cheshmeh Jadar چشمه جادر
- Village
- Location within Iran
- Coordinates: 33°59′48″N 46°22′41″E
- Country: Iran
- Province: Kermanshah
- County: Gilan-e Gharb
- Bakhsh: Govar
- Rural District: Gowavar

Population (2006)
  - Total: 172
- Time zone: UTC+3:30 (IRST)
  - Summer (DST): UTC+4:30 (IRDT)

Cheshmeh Jadar (Persian: چشمه جادر, also Romanized as Cheshmeh Jādar; also known as Cheshmeh Jādar Rūtah) is a village in Gowavar Rural District, Govar District, Gilan-e Gharb County, Kermanshah Province, Iran. At the 2006 census, its population was 172, in 36 families.
