= Cheshmeh Betal =

Cheshmeh Betal چشمه بطال
- Village
- Location within Iran
- Coordinates: 33°54′47″N 46°30′53″E
- Country: Iran
- Province: Kermanshah
- County: Gilan-e Gharb
- Bakhsh: Govar
- Rural District: Gowavar

Population (2006)
  - Total: 53
- Time zone: UTC+3:30 (IRST)
  - Summer (DST): UTC+4:30 (IRDT)

Cheshmeh Betal (Persian: چشمه بطال, also Romanized as Cheshmeh Beţāl) is a village in Gowavar Rural District, Govar District, Gilan-e Gharb County, Kermanshah Province, Iran. At the 2006 census, its population was 53, in 8 families.
