= Zerrover =

Zerrover زرور
- Village
- Location within Iran
- Coordinates: 33°52′07″N 46°37′07″E
- Country: Iran
- Province: Kermanshah
- County: Gilan-e Gharb
- Bakhsh: Govar
- Rural District: Gowavar

Population (2006)
  - Total: 66
- Time zone: UTC+3:30 (IRST)
  - Summer (DST): UTC+4:30 (IRDT)

Zerrover (Persian: زرور, also Romanized as Zorūr; also known as Zarūd) is a village in Gowavar Rural District, Govar District, Gilan-e Gharb County, Kermanshah Province, Iran.

== Demographics ==
At the 2006 census, its population was 66, in 16 families.
