= Peykulah =

Peykulah پيكوله
- Village
- Location within Iran
- Coordinates: 33°53′08″N 46°34′36″E
- Country: Iran
- Province: Kermanshah
- County: Gilan-e Gharb
- Bakhsh: Govar
- Rural District: Gowavar

Population (2006)
  - Total: 73
- Time zone: UTC+3:30 (IRST)
  - Summer (DST): UTC+4:30 (IRDT)

Peykulah (Persian: پيكوله, also Romanized as Peykūlah; also known as Pey Kolā, Peykolah, and Pey Koleh) is a village in Gowavar Rural District, Govar District, Gilan-e Gharb County, Kermanshah Province, Iran. At the 2006 census, its population was 73, in 18 families.
