= Qeytul, Gilan-e Gharb =

Qeytul قيطول
- Village
- Location within Iran
- Coordinates: 34°11′48″N 46°05′26″E
- Country: Iran
- Province: Kermanshah
- County: Gilan-e Gharb
- Bakhsh: Govar
- Rural District: Heydariyeh

Population (2006)
  - Total: 591
- Time zone: UTC+3:30 (IRST)
  - Summer (DST): UTC+4:30 (IRDT)

Qeytul (Persian: قيطول, also Romanized as Qeyţūl; also known as Qeyţūr) is a village in Heydariyeh Rural District, Govar District, Gilan-e Gharb County, Kermanshah Province, Iran. At the 2006 census, its population was 591, in 129 families.
