= Sukhur-e Rashid =

Sukhur-e Rashid (Persian: سوخور رشید) may refer to:

- Sukhur-e Rashid-e Olya
- Sukhur-e Rashid-e Sofla
