= Alirezavandi, Govar =

Alirezavandi عليرضاوندي
- Village
- Location within Iran
- Coordinates: 34°04′14″N 46°22′33″E
- Country: Iran
- Province: Kermanshah
- County: Gilan-e Gharb
- Bakhsh: Govar
- Rural District: Gowavar

Population (2006)
  - Total: 36
- Time zone: UTC+3:30 (IRST)
  - Summer (DST): UTC+4:30 (IRDT)

Alirezavandi (Persian: عليرضاوندي, also Romanized as ‘Alīreẕāvandī; also known as Şeyd Ayāz-e ‘Alīreẕā Vandī) is a village in Gowavar Rural District, Govar District, Gilan-e Gharb County, Kermanshah Province, Iran. At the 2006 census, its population was 36, in 6 families.
