= Baskeleh-ye Khan Mirza =

Baskeleh-ye Khan Mirza باسكله خان ميرزا
- Village
- Location within Iran
- Coordinates: 33°55′21″N 46°29′17″E
- Country: Iran
- Province: Kermanshah
- County: Gilan-e Gharb
- Bakhsh: Govar
- Rural District: Gowavar

Population (2006)
  - Total: 96
- Time zone: UTC+3:30 (IRST)
  - Summer (DST): UTC+4:30 (IRDT)

Baskeleh-ye Khan Mirza (Persian: باسكله خان ميرزا, also Romanized as Bāskeleh-ye Khān Mīrzā) is a village in Gowavar Rural District, Govar District, Gilan-e Gharb County, Kermanshah Province, Iran. At the 2006 census, its population was 96, in 16 families.
