= Qaleh Remen =

Qaleh Remen قلعه رمن
- village
- Location within Iran
- Coordinates: 33°59′01″N 46°25′02″E
- Country: Iran
- Province: Kermanshah
- County: Gilan-e Gharb
- Bakhsh: Govar
- Rural District: Gowavar
- Elevation: 1,499 m (4,918 ft)

Population (2006)
  - Total: 313
- Time zone: UTC+3:30 (IRST)
  - Summer (DST): UTC+4:30 (IRDT)

Qaleh Remen (Persian: قلعه رمن, also Romanized as Qal‘eh Remen; also known as Qalārmen) is a village in Gowavar Rural District, Govar District, Gilan-e Gharb County, Kermanshah Province, Iran. At the 2006 census, its population was 313, in 53 families.
