= Sukhur-e Namdar =

Sukhur-e Namdar (Persian: سوخورنامدار) may refer to:

- Sukhur-e Namdar-e Abdi
- Sukhur-e Namdar-e Mirzapur
