= Kalkash =

Kalkash or Kalkesh (Persian: كلكش) may refer to:

- Kal Kash, a village in Gilan-e Gharb County, Kermanshah province, Iran
- Kalkesh, East Azerbaijan
- Kalkash, Kermanshah
- Kalkash, Zanjan
