= Baskeleh-ye Boruvim =

Baskeleh-ye Boruvim باسكله بورويم
- Village
- Location within Iran
- Coordinates: 33°56′09″N 46°28′49″E
- Country: Iran
- Province: Kermanshah
- County: Gilan-e Gharb
- Bakhsh: Govar
- Rural District: Gowavar

Population (2006)
  - Total: 209
- Time zone: UTC+3:30 (IRST)
  - Summer (DST): UTC+4:30 (IRDT)

Baskeleh-ye Boruvim (Persian: باسكله بورويم, also Romanized as Baskeleh-ye Borūvīm; also known as Baskeleh, Baskeleh-ye Būrīm, and Borūvīm Bāskeleh-ye Amīn) is a village in Gowavar Rural District, Govar District, Gilan-e Gharb County, Kermanshah Province, Iran. At the 2006 census, its population was 209, in 38 families.
