= Cheshmeh Hajegah =

Cheshmeh Hajegah (Persian: چشمه حاجگه) may refer to:

- Cheshmeh Hajegah Jafari
- Cheshmeh Hajegah Shirzadi
