= Kakavand, Lorestan =

Kakavand كاكاوند
- Village
- Location within Iran
- Coordinates: 33°31′28″N 46°51′49″E
- Country: Iran
- Province: Lorestan
- County: Kuhdasht
- Bakhsh: Kunani
- Rural District: Zirtang

Population (2006)
  - Total: 101
- Time zone: UTC+3:30 (IRST)
  - Summer (DST): UTC+4:30 (IRDT)

Kakavand (Persian: كاكاوند, also Romanized as Kākāvand; also known as Kākāvand Rāh) is a village in Zirtang Rural District, Kunani District, Kuhdasht County, Lorestan Province, Iran. At the 2006 census, its population was 101, in 18 families.
