= Mirmangan =

Mirmangan (Persian: ميرمنگان) may refer to:

- Mirmangan-e Olya
- Mirmangan-e Sofla
