= Dehmennatali =

Dehmennatali ده منتعلي
- Village
- Location within Iran
- Coordinates: 33°23′57″N 47°11′28″E
- Country: Iran
- Province: Lorestan
- County: Kuhdasht
- Bakhsh: Kunani
- Rural District: Zirtang

Population (2006)
  - Total: 196
- Time zone: UTC+3:30 (IRST)
  - Summer (DST): UTC+4:30 (IRDT)

Dehmennatali (Persian: ده منتعلي, also Romanized as Dehmennatʿalī) is a village in Zirtang Rural District, Kunani District, Kuhdasht County, Lorestan Province, Iran. At the 2006 census, its population was 196, in 35 families.
