= Bahram Beyg =

Bahram Beyg or Bahram Bayg (Persian: بهرام بيگ) may refer to:

- Bahram Bayg, Kermanshah
- Bahram Beyg, Lorestan
- Bahram Beyg, Zanjan
