= Rudbar Hoseyn Beyg =

Rudbar Hoseyn Beyg رودبارحسين بيگ
- Village
- Location within Iran
- Coordinates: 33°18′18″N 47°11′12″E
- Country: Iran
- Province: Lorestan
- County: Kuhdasht
- Bakhsh: Kunani
- Rural District: Zirtang

Population (2006)
  - Total: 161
- Time zone: UTC+3:30 (IRST)
  - Summer (DST): UTC+4:30 (IRDT)

Rudbar Hoseyn Beyg (Persian: رودبارحسين بيگ, also Romanized as Rūdbar Ḩoseyn Beyg; also known as Rūdbarreh) is a village in Zirtang Rural District, Kunani District, Kuhdasht County, Lorestan Province, Iran. At the 2006 census, its population was 161, in 25 families.
