= Siah Kamareh Zali =

Siah Kamareh Zali سياه كمره زالي
- Village
- Location within Iran
- Coordinates: 33°30′40″N 46°53′02″E
- Country: Iran
- Province: Lorestan
- County: Kuhdasht
- Bakhsh: Kunani
- Rural District: Zirtang

Population (2006)
  - Total: 207
- Time zone: UTC+3:30 (IRST)
  - Summer (DST): UTC+4:30 (IRDT)

Siah Kamareh Zali (Persian: سياه كمره زالي, also Romanized as Sīāh Kamareh Zālī and Sīāh Kamar-e Zālī) is a village in Zirtang Rural District, Kunani District, Kuhdasht County, Lorestan Province, Iran. At the 2006 census, its population was 207, in 38 families.
