= Sogand Sayyadi =

- Born: 17 November 2010; Alirezavandi, Gilan-e Gharb County, Kermanshah Province, Iran
- Died: 14 November 2026 (aged 15); Kermanshah, Kermanshah Province, Iran
- Cause of death: Death following a fall from the fifth floor of her residential building (according to reports, after allegedly being thrown by her father)
- Occupation: Student

Sogand Sayyadi (Persian: سوگند صیادی; 2010–2026) was a schoolgirl from the village of Alirezavandi, in Gilan-e Gharb County, who lived in the city of Kermanshah. Her name came to public attention in November 2026, following reports concerning her suspicious death and allegations of family violence, which were covered by media outlets and human rights organizations.

== Reports of death ==
The human rights organization Hengaw reported on 16 November 2026 that Sayyadi had died in Kermanshah on 15 November. Citing its sources, the organization alleged that her father had assaulted her at the Rezvan girls' school in front of her classmates shortly before her death. Despite Sayyadi's warnings that she feared returning home, she left the school with her father.

The Hana Human Rights Organization also published a report on her suspicious death, providing a similar account of the alleged violence preceding her death and the response of school officials. However, Hana stated that the exact cause of death and the circumstances surrounding it had not yet been independently verified.

The reports by Hengaw and Hana differ in certain details, including Sayyadi's age and the floor on which the incident reportedly occurred. Hengaw identified Sayyadi as 16 years old and stated that the incident took place on the fifth floor, whereas Hana reported her age as 15 and placed the incident on the third floor of the building.

The reports also differ regarding the date of the incident. Hengaw stated that Sayyadi died on 15 November 2026, whereas the Human Rights Activists News Agency (HRANA), citing Rokna, reported the date as 14 November.

Sayyadi was buried on 16 November 2026 in the village of Dartut Sayyadi, in Gilan-e Gharb County.

== Investigation ==
The Hana Human Rights Organization reported that the Kermanshah Department of Education had launched an administrative investigation into the case. The organization called for an independent and transparent investigation into the cause of Sayyadi's death and an examination of the possible responsibility of school officials.

On 16 November 2026, Hamidreza Karimi, the public and revolutionary prosecutor of Kermanshah Province, announced that a judicial case had been opened into Sayyadi's death and that arrest warrants had been issued for individuals connected to the case. According to Karimi, judicial investigations and expert examinations were underway to establish the cause of death and the circumstances of the incident. Both murder and suicide were among the hypotheses under investigation. The prosecutor stated that no definitive conclusion could be reached regarding the cause of death until the investigation had been completed and expert findings had been announced.

The BBC also reported on 16 November 2026 on the Kermanshah prosecutor's statements regarding the opening of a judicial case and the issuance of arrest warrants for individuals connected to Sayyadi's death. The report also referred to an earlier Rokna article concerning Sayyadi's father visiting the school and requesting her academic records.

Tasnim News Agency published a further report on 17 November 2026, containing an account by the Kermanshah Provincial Department of Education regarding Sayyadi's last attendance at school. According to a statement quoted in the report, Sayyadi's father visited the school at 8:30 a.m. on Saturday, 14 November, and requested her academic records for the purpose of transferring her to Gilan-e Gharb County. The statement said that, following the completion of administrative procedures, the records were handed over to her father at 9:00 a.m., and he and Sogand left the school at 9:05 a.m. The Department of Education also stated that Sayyadi died that afternoon at her father's home, outside the school premises, and that the cause of the incident remained under investigation.

This account differs from earlier statements by the director of public relations of the Kermanshah Department of Education, published in an interview with Rokna. In that interview, it was stated that Sogand's father had visited the school one day before the incident to request her academic records, but the records had not been handed over to the family. The account published by Tasnim also differs from Hengaw's report regarding the date of the incident, as Hengaw identified 15 November as the date of her death.

== Media coverage ==
Iran International published a report on Sogand Sayyadi's death on 16 November 2026. In its coverage, the outlet attributed details about Sayyadi's life and accounts of the events at school and the circumstances of her death to a report by the human rights organization Hengaw.

IranWire also published a report on 16 November covering the case. It recounted details from Hengaw's report concerning the alleged assault of Sogand at school, her return home with her father, and the allegation that she had been thrown from the fifth floor.
