= Ramavand Piruz Ali =

Ramavand Piruz Ali رماوند پيروز علي
- Village
- Location within Iran
- Coordinates: 33°19′27″N 47°10′01″E
- Country: Iran
- Province: Lorestan
- County: Kuhdasht
- Bakhsh: Kunani
- Rural District: Zirtang

Population (2006)
  - Total: 40
- Time zone: UTC+3:30 (IRST)
  - Summer (DST): UTC+4:30 (IRDT)

Ramavand Piruz Ali (Persian: رماوند پيروز علي, also Romanized as Ramāvand Pīrūz ʿAlī; also known as Ramāvand and Cham Charāgh) is a village in Zirtang Rural District, Kunani District, Kuhdasht County, Lorestan Province, Iran. At the 2006 census, its population was 40, in 5 families.
