= Choqa Sabz =

Choqa Sabz (Persian: چقاسبز) may refer to:

- Chaqa Sabz
- Choqa Sabz-e Naqd-e Ali
- Choqa-ye Sabz
