= Cham-e Mir Beyg =

Cham-e Mir Beyg چم ميربيگ
- Village
- Location within Iran
- Coordinates: 33°28′42″N 46°55′52″E
- Country: Iran
- Province: Lorestan
- County: Kuhdasht
- Bakhsh: Kunani
- Rural District: Zirtang

Population (2006)
  - Total: 212
- Time zone: UTC+3:30 (IRST)
  - Summer (DST): UTC+4:30 (IRDT)

Cham-e Mir Beyg (Persian: چم ميربيگ, also Romanized as Cham-e Mīr Beyg and Cham-e Mīr Bak) is a village in Zirtang Rural District, Kunani District, Kuhdasht County, Lorestan Province, Iran. At the 2006 census, its population was 212, in 35 families.
