= Chah Qazi =

Chah Qazi چاه قاضي
- Village
- Location within Iran
- Coordinates: 33°32′45″N 46°56′12″E
- Country: Iran
- Province: Lorestan
- County: Kuhdasht
- Bakhsh: Kunani
- Rural District: Zirtang

Population (2006)
  - Total: 186
- Time zone: UTC+3:30 (IRST)
  - Summer (DST): UTC+4:30 (IRDT)

Chah Qazi (Persian: چاه قاضي, also Romanized as Chāh Qāz̤ī; also known as Chāh Qāsemī, Chāh Qāsī, and Hājjī ʿAlī) is a village in Zirtang Rural District, Kunani District, Kuhdasht County, Lorestan Province, Iran. At the 2006 census, its population was 186, in 36 families.
