= Sukhur-e Ali Mohammad-e Gol Mohammadi =

Sukhvor-e Ali Mohammad-e Gol Mohammadi سوخورعلي محمدگل محمدي
- Village
- Location within Iran
- Coordinates: 34°10′04″N 46°06′38″E
- Country: Iran
- Province: Kermanshah
- County: Gilan-e Gharb
- Bakhsh: Govar
- Rural District: Heydariyeh

Population (2006)
  - Total: 229
- Time zone: UTC+3:30 (IRST)
  - Summer (DST): UTC+4:30 (IRDT)

Sukhvor-e Ali Mohammad-e Gol Mohammadi (Persian: سوخورعلي محمدگل محمدي, also Romanized as Sūkhvor-e ‘Alī Moḩammad-e Gol Moḩammadī and Sūkhūr-e ‘Alī Moḩammad-e Gol Moḩammadī; also known as Sūkhar-e Moḩammadī and Sūkhvor Gol Moḩammadī) is a village in Heydariyeh Rural District, Govar District, Gilan-e Gharb County, Kermanshah Province, Iran. During the 2006 census, its population was 229, in 48 families.
