= Mirmangan-e Sofla =

Mirmangan-e Sofla ميرمنگان سفلي
- Village
- Country: Iran
- Province: Kermanshah
- County: Gilan-e Gharb
- Bakhsh: Govar
- Rural District: Gowavar

Population (2006)
  - Total: 174
- Time zone: UTC+3:30 (IRST)
  - Summer (DST): UTC+4:30 (IRDT)

Mirmangan-e Sofla (Persian: ميرمنگان سفلي, also Romanized as Mīrmangān-e Soflá) is a village in Gowavar Rural District, Govar District, Gilan-e Gharb County, Kermanshah Province, Iran. At the 2006 census, its population was 174, in 37 families.
