= Alirezavandi =

Alirezavandi or Ali Rezavandi (Persian: عليرضاوندي) may refer to:

- Alirezavandi, Gilan-e Gharb
- Alirezavandi, Govar
