= Kul Nabi Sahara =

Kul Nabi Sahara كول نبي صحرا
- Village
- Country: Iran
- Province: Lorestan
- County: Kuhdasht
- Bakhsh: Kunani
- Rural District: Zirtang

Population (2006)
  - Total: 73
- Time zone: UTC+3:30 (IRST)
  - Summer (DST): UTC+4:30 (IRDT)

Kul Nabi Sahara (Persian: كول نبي صحرا, also Romanized as Kūl Nabī Saḥarā) is a village in Zirtang Rural District, Kunani District, Kuhdasht County, Lorestan Province, Iran. At the 2006 census, its population was 73, in 12 families.
