= Mirmangan-e Olya =

Mirmangan-e Olya ميرمنگان عليا
- Village
- Country: Iran
- Province: Kermanshah
- County: Gilan-e Gharb
- Bakhsh: Govar
- Rural District: Gowavar

Population (2006)
  - Total: 431
- Time zone: UTC+3:30 (IRST)
  - Summer (DST): UTC+4:30 (IRDT)

Mirmangan-e Olya (Persian: ميرمنگان عليا, also Romanized as Mīrmangān-e ‘Olyā) is a village in Gowavar Rural District, Govar District, Gilan-e Gharb County, Kermanshah Province, Iran. At the 2006 census, its population was 431, in 96 families.
