= Shurabeh-ye Sofla =

Shurabeh-ye Sofla (Persian: شورابه سفلي) may refer to:

- Shurabeh-ye Sofla 1
- Shurabeh-ye Sofla 2
