= Cham-e Borzu =

Cham-e Borzu چم برزو
- Village
- Location within Iran
- Coordinates: 33°26′04″N 47°00′49″E
- Country: Iran
- Province: Lorestan
- County: Kuhdasht
- Bakhsh: Kunani
- Rural District: Zirtang

Population (2006)
  - Total: 410
- Time zone: UTC+3:30 (IRST)
  - Summer (DST): UTC+4:30 (IRDT)

Cham-e Borzu (Persian: چم برزو, also Romanized as Cham-e Borzū and Cham Borzū) is a village in Zirtang Rural District, Kunani District, Kuhdasht County, Lorestan Province, Iran. At the 2006 census, its population was 410, in 71 families.
