= Kazem Khani-ye Olya =

Village in Kermanshah, Iran

Kazem Khani-ye Olya كاظم خاني عليا
- Village
- Location within Iran
- Coordinates: 34°12′37″N 46°03′49″E
- Country: Iran
- Province: Kermanshah
- County: Gilan-e Gharb
- Bakhsh: Govar
- Rural District: Heydariyeh

Population (2006)
  - Total: 351
- Time zone: UTC+3:30 (IRST)
  - Summer (DST): UTC+4:30 (IRDT)

Kazem Khani-ye Olya (Persian: كاظم خاني عليا, also Romanized as Kāz̧em Khānī-ye ‘Olyā; also known as Kāz̧em Khānī) is a village in Heydariyeh Rural District, Govar District, Gilan-e Gharb County, Kermanshah Province, Iran. At the 2006 census, its population was 351, in 77 families.
