= Cheshmeh Mirza =

Cheshmeh Mirza چشمه ميرزا
- Village
- Location within Iran
- Coordinates: 33°27′14″N 47°21′16″E
- Country: Iran
- Province: Lorestan
- County: Kuhdasht
- Bakhsh: Kunani
- Rural District: Kunani

Population (2006)
  - Total: 151
- Time zone: UTC+3:30 (IRST)
  - Summer (DST): UTC+4:30 (IRDT)

Cheshmeh Mirza (Persian: چشمه ميرزا, also Romanized as Cheshmeh Mīrzā; also known as Roshnow) is a village in Kunani Rural District, Kunani District, Kuhdasht County, Lorestan Province, Iran. At the 2006 census, its population was 151, in 29 families.
