= Kazem Khani =

Kazem Khani (Persian: كاظم خاني) may refer to:

- Kazem Khani-ye Olya
- Kazem Khani-ye Sofla
