= Qabr-e Mohammad =

Qabr-e Mohammad قبرمحمدمراد
- Village
- Location within Iran
- Coordinates: 33°27′56″N 46°57′57″E
- Country: Iran
- Province: Lorestan
- County: Kuhdasht
- Bakhsh: Kunani
- Rural District: Zirtang

Population (2006)
  - Total: 152
- Time zone: UTC+3:30 (IRST)
  - Summer (DST): UTC+4:30 (IRDT)

Qabr-e Mohammad (Persian: قبرمحمدمراد, also Romanized as Qabr-e Moḩammad; also known as Qabr-e Moḩammad Morād) is a village in Zirtang Rural District, Kunani District, Kuhdasht County, Lorestan Province, Iran. At the 2006 census, its population was 152, in 24 families.
