= Sukhur-e Kohzad =

Village in Iran

Sukhvor-e Kohzad سوخوركهزاد
- Village
- Location within Iran
- Coordinates: 34°10′30″N 46°06′09″E
- Country: Iran
- Province: Kermanshah
- County: Gilan-e Gharb
- Bakhsh: Govar
- Rural District: Heydariyeh

Population (2006)
  - Total: 355
- Time zone: UTC+3:30 (IRST)
  - Summer (DST): UTC+4:30 (IRDT)

Sukhvor-e Kohzad (Persian: سوخوركهزاد, also Romanized as Sūkhvor-e Kohzād and Sūkhūr-e Kohzād; also known as Sūkhvor Gahzād) is a village in Heydariyeh Rural District, Govar District, Gilan-e Gharb County, Kermanshah Province, Iran. At the 2006 census, its population was 355, in 80 families.
