= Kazem Khani-ye Sofla =

Kazem Khani-ye Sofla كاظم خاني سفلي
- Village
- Location within Iran
- Coordinates: 34°13′14″N 46°02′04″E
- Country: Iran
- Province: Kermanshah
- County: Gilan-e Gharb
- Bakhsh: Govar
- Rural District: Heydariyeh

Population (2006)
  - Total: 277
- Time zone: UTC+3:30 (IRST)
  - Summer (DST): UTC+4:30 (IRDT)

Kazem Khani-ye Sofla (Persian: كاظم خاني سفلي, also Romanized as Kāz̧em Khānī-ye Soflá; also known as Hārbar) is a village in Heydariyeh Rural District, Govar District, Gilan-e Gharb County, Kermanshah Province, Iran. At the 2006 census, its population was 277, in 56 families.
