= Meleh Chah Shureh =

Meleh Chah Shureh مله چه شوره
- Village
- Location within Iran
- Coordinates: 33°29′11″N 47°00′53″E
- Country: Iran
- Province: Lorestan
- County: Kuhdasht
- Bakhsh: Kunani
- Rural District: Zirtang

Population (2006)
  - Total: 83
- Time zone: UTC+3:30 (IRST)
  - Summer (DST): UTC+4:30 (IRDT)

Meleh Chah Shureh (Persian: مله چه شوره, also Romanized as Meleh Chah Shūreh; also known as Melechah) is a village in Zirtang Rural District, Kunani District, Kuhdasht County, Lorestan Province, Iran. At the 2006 census, its population was 83, in 17 families.
