= Cheshmeh Sefid-e Usin =

Cheshmeh Sefid-e Usin چشمه سفيدوسين
- Village
- Location within Iran
- Coordinates: 34°00′08″N 46°22′26″E
- Country: Iran
- Province: Kermanshah
- County: Gilan-e Gharb
- Bakhsh: Govar
- Rural District: Gowavar

Population (2006)
  - Total: 198
- Time zone: UTC+3:30 (IRST)
  - Summer (DST): UTC+4:30 (IRDT)

Cheshmeh Sefid-e Usin (Persian: چشمه سفيدوسين, also Romanized as Cheshmeh Sefīd-e Ūsīn; also known as Cheshmeh Sefīd-e Ardeshīrī and Cheshmeh-ye Sefīd-e Ardeshīrī) is a village in Gowavar Rural District, Govar District, Gilan-e Gharb County, Kermanshah Province, Iran. At the 2006 census, its population was 198, in 34 families.
