= Tulak, Iran =

Tulak تولك
- Village
- Location within Iran
- Coordinates: 33°52′32″N 46°36′31″E
- Country: Iran
- Province: Kermanshah
- County: Gilan-e Gharb
- Bakhsh: Govar
- Rural District: Gowavar

Population (2006)
  - Total: 154
- Time zone: UTC+3:30 (IRST)
  - Summer (DST): UTC+4:30 (IRDT)

Tulak (Persian: تولك, also Romanized as Tūlak) is a village in Gowavar Rural District, Govar District, Gilan-e Gharb County, Kermanshah Province, Iran. At the 2006 census, its population was 154, in 33 families.
