= Baskeleh-ye Cheshmeh Sefid =

Baskeleh-ye Cheshmeh Sefid باسكله چشمه سفيد
- Village
- Location within Iran
- Coordinates: 33°55′50″N 46°29′02″E
- Country: Iran
- Province: Kermanshah
- County: Gilan-e Gharb
- Bakhsh: Govar
- Rural District: Gowavar

Population (2006)
  - Total: 215
- Time zone: UTC+3:30 (IRST)
  - Summer (DST): UTC+4:30 (IRDT)

Baskeleh-ye Cheshmeh Sefid (Persian: باسكله چشمه سفيد, also Romanized as Bāskeleh-ye Cheshmeh Sefīd; also known as Cheshmeh Sefīd) is a village in Gowavar Rural District, Govar District, Gilan-e Gharb County, Kermanshah Province, Iran. At the 2006 census, its population was 215, in 45 families.
