= Cheshmeh Hajegah Jafari =

Cheshmeh Hajegah Jafari چشمه حاجگه جعفري
- Village
- Location within Iran
- Coordinates: 33°59′07″N 46°24′10″E
- Country: Iran
- Province: Kermanshah
- County: Gilan-e Gharb
- Bakhsh: Govar
- Rural District: Gowavar

Population (2006)
  - Total: 483
- Time zone: UTC+3:30 (IRST)
  - Summer (DST): UTC+4:30 (IRDT)

Cheshmeh Hajegah Jafari (Persian: چشمه حاجگه جعفري, also Romanized as Cheshmeh Ḩājegah Jaʿfarī; also known as Cheshmeh Ḩājegah and Cheshmeh Jājgah) is a village in Gowavar Rural District, Govar District, Gilan-e Gharb County, Kermanshah Province, Iran. At the 2006 census, its population was 483, in 100 families.
