= Kalarcheh Shureh =

Kalarcheh Shureh كلارچه شوره
- Village
- Location within Iran
- Coordinates: 33°29′41″N 47°00′18″E
- Country: Iran
- Province: Lorestan
- County: Kuhdasht
- Bakhsh: Kunani
- Rural District: Zirtang

Population (2006)
  - Total: 121
- Time zone: UTC+3:30 (IRST)
  - Summer (DST): UTC+4:30 (IRDT)

Kalarcheh Shureh (Persian: كلارچه شوره, also Romanized as Kalārcheh Shūreh; also known as Kalehchah Shūreh) is a village in Zirtang Rural District, Kunani District, Kuhdasht County, Lorestan Province, Iran. At the 2006 census, its population was 121, in 27 families.
