= Bahram Bayg, Kermanshah =

Bahram Bayg بهرام بيگ
- Village
- Location within Iran
- Coordinates: 33°59′00″N 46°24′27″E
- Country: Iran
- Province: Kermanshah
- County: Gilan-e Gharb
- Bakhsh: Govar
- Rural District: Gowavar

Population (2006)
  - Total: 131
- Time zone: UTC+3:30 (IRST)
  - Summer (DST): UTC+4:30 (IRDT)

Bahram Bayg (Persian: بهرام بيگ, also Romanized as Bahrām Bayg; also known as Bahrām Beg) is a village in Gowavar Rural District, Govar District, Gilan-e Gharb County, Kermanshah Province, Iran. At the 2006 census, its population was 131, in 26 families.
