= Baskeleh-ye Vasat =

Baskeleh-ye Vasat باسكله وسط
- Village
- Location within Iran
- Coordinates: 33°56′20″N 46°28′25″E
- Country: Iran
- Province: Kermanshah
- County: Gilan-e Gharb
- Bakhsh: Govar
- Rural District: Gowavar

Population (2006)
  - Total: 232
- Time zone: UTC+3:30 (IRST)
  - Summer (DST): UTC+4:30 (IRDT)

Baskeleh-ye Vasat (Persian: باسكله وسط, also Romanized as Bāskeleh-ye Vasaţ) is a village in Gowavar Rural District, Govar District, Gilan-e Gharb County, Kermanshah Province, Iran. At the 2006 census, its population was 232, in 48 families.
