= Parcheh Sorkheh =

Parcheh Sorkheh پرچه سرخه
- Village
- Location within Iran
- Coordinates: 33°31′09″N 46°58′15″E
- Country: Iran
- Province: Lorestan
- County: Kuhdasht
- Bakhsh: Kunani
- Rural District: Zirtang

Population (2006)
  - Total: 88
- Time zone: UTC+3:30 (IRST)
  - Summer (DST): UTC+4:30 (IRDT)

Parcheh Sorkheh (Persian: پرچه سرخه; also known as Pacheh Sorkheh and Pachī Shorkheh) is a village in Zirtang Rural District, Kunani District, Kuhdasht County, Lorestan Province, Iran. At the 2006 census, its population was 88, in 15 families.
