= Basat Beygi =

Basat Beygi بساط بيگي
- Village
- Location within Iran
- Coordinates: 33°24′08″N 47°18′26″E
- Country: Iran
- Province: Lorestan
- County: Kuhdasht
- Bakhsh: Kunani
- Rural District: Kunani

Population (2006)
  - Total: 2,676
- Time zone: UTC+3:30 (IRST)
  - Summer (DST): UTC+4:30 (IRDT)

Basat Beygi (Persian: بساط بيگي, also Romanized as Basāţ Beygī; also known as Qal‘eh-ye Basāţ Beygī and Qal’eh Basāt) is a village in Kunani Rural District, Kunani District, Kuhdasht County, Lorestan Province, Iran. At the 2006 census, its population was 2,676, in 546 families.
