= Lateh Choqa Sayyadan =

Village in Kermanshah province, Iran

Lateh Choqa Sayyadan Persian: لته چقا صياديان
- Village
- Location within Iran
- Coordinates: 33°58′14″N 46°26′16″E
- Country: Iran
- Province: Kermanshah
- County: Gilan-e Gharb
- District: Gowavar
- Rural District: Gowavar

Population (2016)
  - Total: 620
- Time zone: UTC+3:30 (IRST)

Lateh Choqa Sayyadan (Persian: لته چقاصياديان) (Note: Also romanized as Lateh Choqā Şayyādān; also known as Lāneh Chīā, Lāneh Jīā, Lateh Choqā, and Şayyādān) is a village in Gowavar Rural District of Gowavar District, Gilan-e Gharb County, Kermanshah province, Iran.

== Demographics ==
=== Population ===
At the time of the 2006 National Census, the village's population was 737 in 134 households. The following census in 2011 counted 684 people in 258165households. The 2016 census measured the population of the village as 620 people in 163 households. It was the most populous village in its rural district.
