= Chaleh Siah =

Chaleh Siah (Persian: چاله سياه) may refer to:

- Chaleh Siah, Ilam
- Chaleh Siah, Kermanshah
- Chaleh Siah, Mazandaran

== See also ==
- Chal Siah (disambiguation)
