= Cheshmeh Hajegah Shirzadi =

Cheshmeh Hajegah Shirzadi چشمه حاجگه شيرزادي
- Village
- Country: Iran
- Province: Kermanshah
- County: Gilan-e Gharb
- Bakhsh: Govar
- Rural District: Gowavar

Population (2006)
  - Total: 84
- Time zone: UTC+3:30 (IRST)
  - Summer (DST): UTC+4:30 (IRDT)

Cheshmeh Hajegah Shirzadi (Persian: چشمه حاجگه شيرزادي, also Romanized as Cheshmeh Ḩājegah Shīrzādī) is a village in Gowavar Rural District, Govar District, Gilan-e Gharb County, Kermanshah Province, Iran. At the 2006 census, its population was 84, in 15 families.
