= Sukhur-e Hajji Morad =

Sukhvor-e Hajji Morad سوخورحاجي مراد
- Village
- Country: Iran
- Province: Kermanshah
- County: Gilan-e Gharb
- Bakhsh: Govar
- Rural District: Heydariyeh

Population (2006)
  - Total: 108
- Time zone: UTC+3:30 (IRST)
  - Summer (DST): UTC+4:30 (IRDT)

Sukhvor-e Hajji Morad (Persian: سوخورحاجي مراد, also Romanized as Sūkhvor-e Ḩājjī Morād) is a village in Heydariyeh Rural District, Govar District, Gilan-e Gharb County, Kermanshah Province, Iran. At the 2006 census, its population was 108, in 26 families.
