= Sukhur-e Shahbaz-e Najafi =

Sukhvor-e Shahbaz-e Najafi سوخورشهبازنجفي
- Village
- Location within Iran
- Coordinates: 34°09′50″N 46°07′04″E
- Country: Iran
- Province: Kermanshah
- County: Gilan-e Gharb
- Bakhsh: Govar
- Rural District: Heydariyeh

Population (2006)
  - Total: 95
- Time zone: UTC+3:30 (IRST)
  - Summer (DST): UTC+4:30 (IRDT)

Sukhvor-e Shahbaz-e Najafi (Persian: سوخورشهبازنجفي, also Romanized as Sūkhvor-e Shahbāz-e Najafī, Sūkhūr-e Shahbāz-e Najafī, and Sūkhvor Shahbāz Najafī) is a village in Heydariyeh Rural District, Govar District, Gilan-e Gharb County, Kermanshah Province, Iran. At the 2006 census, its population was 95, in 15 families.
