= Ab Barik, Kuhdasht =

Village in Lorestan, Iran

Ab Barik آب باريک
- Village
- Country: Iran
- Province: Lorestan
- County: Kuhdasht
- Bakhsh: Kunani
- Rural District: Zirtang

Population (2006)
  - Total: 40
- Time zone: UTC+3:30 (IRST)
  - Summer (DST): UTC+4:30 (IRDT)

Ab Barik (Persian: آب باريک, also Romanized as Āb Bārīk; also known as Meyr and Mīr) is a village in Zirtang Rural District, Kunani District, Kuhdasht County, Lorestan province, Iran. At the 2006 census, its population was 40, in 6 families.
