= Sar Gandab-e Sofla =

Sar Gandab-e Sofla سرگنداب سفلي
- Village
- Location within Iran
- Coordinates: 33°30′19″N 46°53′45″E
- Country: Iran
- Province: Lorestan
- County: Kuhdasht
- Bakhsh: Kunani
- Rural District: Zirtang

Population (2006)
  - Total: 115
- Time zone: UTC+3:30 (IRST)
  - Summer (DST): UTC+4:30 (IRDT)

Sar Gandab-e Sofla (Persian: سرگنداب سفلي, also Romanized as Sar Gandāb-e Soflá; also known as Sar Gandāb) is a village in Zirtang Rural District, Kunani District, Kuhdasht County, Lorestan Province, Iran. At the 2006 census, its population was 115, in 20 families.
