= Pa-ye Astan =

Pa-ye Astan پاي استان
- Village
- Location within Iran
- Coordinates: 33°26′15″N 47°23′02″E
- Country: Iran
- Province: Lorestan
- County: Kuhdasht
- Bakhsh: Kunani
- Rural District: Kunani

Population (2006)
  - Total: 259
- Time zone: UTC+3:30 (IRST)
  - Summer (DST): UTC+4:30 (IRDT)

Pa-ye Astan (Persian: پاي استان, also Romanized as Pā-ye Āstān, Pā Āsetān, Pāy Āsetān, and Pa yi Āstān) is a village in Kunani Rural District, Kunani District, Kuhdasht County, Lorestan Province, Iran. At the 2006 census, its population was 259, in 53 families.
