= Bagh Pay Astan =

Bagh Pay Astan باغ پاي استان
- Village
- Country: Iran
- Province: Lorestan
- County: Kuhdasht
- Bakhsh: Kunani
- Rural District: Kunani

Population (2006)
  - Total: 79
- Time zone: UTC+3:30 (IRST)
  - Summer (DST): UTC+4:30 (IRDT)

Bagh Pay Astan (Persian: باغ پاي استان, also Romanized as Bāgh Pāy Āstān) is a village in Kunani Rural District, Kunani District, Kuhdasht County, Lorestan Province, Iran. At the 2006 census, its population was 79, in 17 families.
