= Sukhur-e Shahbaz-e Shiri =

Sukhvor-e Shahbaz-e Shiri سوخورشهبازشيري
- Village
- Location within Iran
- Coordinates: 34°09′30″N 46°07′31″E
- Country: Iran
- Province: Kermanshah
- County: Gilan-e Gharb
- Bakhsh: Govar
- Rural District: Heydariyeh

Population (2006)
  - Total: 400
- Time zone: UTC+3:30 (IRST)
  - Summer (DST): UTC+4:30 (IRDT)

Sukhvor-e Shahbaz-e Shiri (Persian: سوخورشهبازشيري, also Romanized as Sūkhvor -e Shahbāz-e Shīrī and Sūkhvor Shahbāz Shīrī; also known as Sūkhūr-e Shahbāz-e Shīrī-ye Soflá) is a village in Heydariyeh Rural District, Govar District, Gilan-e Gharb County, Kermanshah Province, Iran. At the 2006 census, its population was 400, in 81 families.
