= Heydarkhani =

Heydarkhani (Persian: حیدرخانی) may refer to:

- Heydarkhani, Kerman
- Heydarkhani, Lorestan
