= Sukhur-e Morovvati =

Sukhvor-e Morovvati سوخورمروتي
- Village
- Location within Iran
- Coordinates: 34°09′04″N 46°07′56″E
- Country: Iran
- Province: Kermanshah
- County: Gilan-e Gharb
- Bakhsh: Govar
- Rural District: Heydariyeh

Population (2006)
  - Total: 388
- Time zone: UTC+3:30 (IRST)
  - Summer (DST): UTC+4:30 (IRDT)

Sukhvor-e Morovvati (Persian: سوخورمروتي, also Romanized as Sūkhvor-e Morovvatī, Sūkhūr-e Morovvatī, and Sūkhvor Morovvatī) is a village in Heydariyeh Rural District, Govar District, Gilan-e Gharb County, Kermanshah Province, Iran. At the 2006 census, its population was 388, in 86 families.
