= Qitul =

Qitul or Kuitul or Qaitol or Qeytul or Qeytur (Persian: قيطول) may refer to:

- Qeytul, Gilan-e Gharb, Kermanshah Province
- Qeytul, Harsin, Kermanshah Province
- Qitul, Qazvin
- Qeytul, Zanjan
- Qeytur, Zanjan
