= Sukhur-e Khush Aqbal =

Sukhvor-e Khush Aqbal سوخورخوش اقبال
- Village
- Country: Iran
- Province: Kermanshah
- County: Gilan-e Gharb
- Bakhsh: Govar
- Rural District: Heydariyeh

Population (2006)
  - Total: 110
- Time zone: UTC+3:30 (IRST)
  - Summer (DST): UTC+4:30 (IRDT)

Sukhvor-e Khush Aqbal (Persian: سوخورخوش اقبال, also Romanized as Sūkhvor-e Khūsh Āqbāl) is a village in Heydariyeh Rural District, Govar District, Gilan-e Gharb County, Kermanshah Province, Iran. At the 2006 census, its population was 110, in 24 families.
