= Sukhur-e Namdar-e Mirzapur =

Sukhvor-e Namdar-e Mirzapur سوخورنامدارميرزاپور
- Village
- Location within Iran
- Coordinates: 34°09′55″N 46°06′51″E
- Country: Iran
- Province: Kermanshah
- County: Gilan-e Gharb
- Bakhsh: Govar
- Rural District: Heydariyeh

Population (2006)
  - Total: 225
- Time zone: UTC+3:30 (IRST)
  - Summer (DST): UTC+4:30 (IRDT)

Sukhvor-e Namdar-e Mirzapur (Persian: سوخورنامدارميرزاپور, also Romanized as Sūkhvor-e Nāmdār-e Mīrzāpūr, Sūkhūr-e Nāmdār-e Mīrzāpūr, and Sūkhvor Nāmdār Mīrzāpūr) is a village in Heydariyeh Rural District, Govar District, Gilan-e Gharb County, Kermanshah Province, Iran. At the 2006 census, its population was 225, in 40 families.
