= Kal Kash =

Village in Kermanshah province, Iran

Kal Kash Persian: كل كش
- Village
- Location within Iran
- Coordinates: 34°07′38″N 46°10′36″E
- Country: Iran
- Province: Kermanshah
- County: Gilan-e Gharb
- District: Gowavar
- Rural District: Heydariyeh

Population (2016)
  - Total: 1,622
- Time zone: UTC+3:30 (IRST)

Kal Kash (Persian: كل كش) (Note: Also romanized as Kal Kesh, Kal Kosh, and Kalkosh; also known as Kal Kūsh, Kalkosh Kāseh, and Kelkuş (Kurdish: کەڵکوش)) is a village in Heydariyeh Rural District of Gowavar District, Gilan-e Gharb County, Kermanshah province, Iran.

== Demographics ==
=== Population ===
At the time of the 2006 National Census, the village's population was 1,864 in 417 households. The following census in 2011 counted 1,843 people in 472 households. The 2016 census measured the population of the village as 1,622 people in 508 households. It was the most populous village in its rural district.
