= Nam Kul =

Village in Lorestan province, Iran

Nam Kul Persian: نام کول
- Village
- Location within Iran
- Coordinates: 33°22′57″N 47°12′31″E
- Country: Iran
- Province: Lorestan
- County: Kuhdasht
- District: Kuhnani
- Rural District: Zirtang

Population (2016)
  - Total: 638
- Time zone: UTC+3:30 (IRST)

Nam Kul (Persian: نام کول) (Note: Also romanized as Nām Kūl; also known as ʿAbdāl ʿAlī Karīmī (عبدالعلي کريم), Nām Kūl-e ‘Olyā, and Nūn Kūl) is a village in Zirtang Rural District (Note: Formerly Rumeshkan-e Gharbi Rural District) of Kuhnani District (Note: Formerly Kunani District) in Kuhdasht County, Lorestan province, Iran.

== Demographics ==
=== Population ===
At the time of the 2006 National Census, the village's population was 724 in 151 households. The following census in 2011 counted 737 people in 182 households. The 2016 census measured the population of the village as 638 people in 187 households, the most populous in its rural district.
