= Shurabeh-ye Vosta =

Shurabeh-ye Vosta شورابه وسطي
- Village
- Location within Iran
- Coordinates: 33°22′00″N 47°35′00″E
- Country: Iran
- Province: Lorestan
- County: Kuhdasht
- Bakhsh: Kunani
- Rural District: Kunani

Population (2006)
  - Total: 181
- Time zone: UTC+3:30 (IRST)
  - Summer (DST): UTC+4:30 (IRDT)

Shurabeh-ye Vosta (Persian: شورابه وسطي, also Romanized as Shūrābeh-ye Vosţá; also known as Shūrābeh) is a village in Kunani Rural District, Kunani District, Kuhdasht County, Lorestan Province, Iran. At the 2006 census, its population was 181, in 35 families.
