= Khosrowabad, Kuhdasht =

Village in Lorestan province, Iran

Khosrowabad Persian: خسرواباد
- Village
- Location within Iran
- Coordinates: 33°24′27″N 47°21′53″E
- Country: Iran
- Province: Lorestan
- County: Kuhdasht
- District: Kuhnani
- Rural District: Kuhnani

Population (2016)
  - Total: 612
- Time zone: UTC+3:30 (IRST)

Khosrowabad (Persian: خسرواباد) (Note: Also romanized as Khosrowābād; also known as Tang-e Khosrowābād and Tang-i-Khusrauābād) is a village in Kuhnani Rural District (Note: Formerly Kunani Rural District) of Kuhnani District (Note: Formerly Kunani District) in Kuhdasht County, Lorestan province, Iran.

== Demographics ==
=== Population ===
At the time of the 2006 National Census, the village's population was 672 in 130 households. The following census in 2011 counted 650 people in 148 households. The 2016 census measured the population of the village as 612 people in 166 households.
