= Ghalajeh tunnel =

Tunnel in Kermanshah province, Iran

Ghalajeh tunnel (Persian: تونل قلاجه) or Arba'een tunnel is a tunnel half of which is located in Eyvan County in Ilam province and the other half in Gwawar District of Gilan-e Gharb County in Kermanshah province of Iran. It connects Ilam Province northward to Kermanshah Province. Inaugurated in 2017 with a length of 2.500 meters, it was the third-longest tunnel in Iran. By eliminating Ghalajeh Mountain Pass, the tunnel has made the route 15 km shorter. It is part of road 17 (Iran).

== See also ==
- Eyvan
- Eslamabad-e Gharb
- Gilan-e Gharb
- Road 48
