= Heydarkhani, Lorestan =

Heydarkhani حیدرخانی
- Village
- Location within Iran
- Coordinates: 33°23′59″N 47°20′17″E
- Country: Iran
- Province: Lorestan
- County: Kuhdasht
- Bakhsh: Kunani
- Rural District: Kunani

Population (2006)
  - Total: 1,315
- Time zone: UTC+3:30 (IRST)
  - Summer (DST): UTC+4:30 (IRDT)

Heydarkhani (Persian: حیدرخانی, also Romanized as Ḩeydarkhānī) is a village in Kunani Rural District, Kunani District, Kuhdasht County, Lorestan Province, Iran. At the 2006 census, its population was 1,315, in 278 families.
