= Sarmast =

City in Kermanshah province, Iran

Sarmast Persian: سرمست
- City
- Location within Iran
- Coordinates: 34°01′35″N 46°19′51″E
- Country: Iran
- Province: Kermanshah
- County: Gilan-e Gharb
- District: Gowavar
- Elevation: 1,550 m (5,090 ft)

Population (2016)
  - Total: 2,913
- Time zone: UTC+3:30 (IRST)

Sarmast (Persian: سرمست) is a city in, and the capital of, Gowavar District of Gilan-e Gharb County, Kermanshah province, Iran. It also serves as the administrative center for Gowavar Rural District. The city is close to the Ghalajeh tunnel.

== Demographics ==
=== Ethnicity ===
Sarmast is populated by Kurds.

=== Population ===
At the time of the 2006 National Census, the city's population was 2,434 in 515 households. The following census in 2011 counted 2,858 people in 702 households. The 2016 census measured the population of the city as 2,913 people in 811 households.

== See also ==
- Kalhor
- Ghalajeh Protected Area
