= Deh Ali Qoli =

Village in Lorestan province, Iran

Deh Ali Qoli Persian: ده علي قلي
- Village
- Location within Iran
- Coordinates: 33°23′21″N 47°12′20″E
- Country: Iran
- Province: Lorestan
- County: Kuhdasht
- District: Kuhnani
- Rural District: Zirtang

Population (2016)
  - Total: 189
- Time zone: UTC+3:30 (IRST)

Deh Ali Qoli (Persian: ده علي قلي) (Note: Also romanized as Deh ‘Alī Qolī; also known as ‘Alī Qolī, Alīqoīi, and ‘Alīqolī Kholeh) is a village in Zirtang Rural District (Note: Formerly Rumeshkan-e Gharbi Rural District) of Kuhnani District (Note: Formerly Kunani District) in Kuhdasht County, Lorestan province, Iran.

== Demographics ==
=== Population ===
At the time of the 2006 National Census, the village's population was 183 in 35 households. The following census in 2011 counted 206 people in 53 households. The 2016 census measured the population of the village as 189 people in 52 households.
