= Garkhashab =

Village in Lorestan province, Iran

Garkhashab Persian: گرخشاب
- Village
- Location within Iran
- Coordinates: 33°24′35″N 47°09′44″E
- Country: Iran
- Province: Lorestan
- County: Kuhdasht
- District: Kuhnani
- Rural District: Zirtang

Population (2016)
  - Total: 364
- Time zone: UTC+3:30 (IRST)

Garkhashab (Persian: گرخشاب) (Note: Also romanized as Garkhashāb; also known as Garkhashāb-e ‘Abdī and Garkhashāb-e Soflá) is a village in, and the capital of, Zirtang Rural District (Note: Formerly Rumeshkan-e Gharbi Rural District) in Kuhnani District (Note: Formerly Kunani District) of Kuhdasht County, Lorestan province, Iran.

== Demographics ==
=== Population ===
At the time of the 2006 National Census, the village's population was 690 in 127 households. The following census in 2011 counted 554 people in 123 households. The 2016 census measured the population of the village as 364 people in 90 households.
