= Sukhur-e Rashid-e Sofla =

Sukhvor-e Rashid-e Sofla سوخور رشيد سفلي
- Village
- Location within Iran
- Coordinates: 34°09′16″N 46°07′52″E
- Country: Iran
- Province: Kermanshah
- County: Gilan-e Gharb
- Bakhsh: Govar
- Rural District: Heydariyeh

Population (2006)
  - Total: 196
- Time zone: UTC+3:30 (IRST)
  - Summer (DST): UTC+4:30 (IRDT)

Sukhvor-e Rashid-e Sofla (Persian: سوخور رشيد سفلي, also Romanized as Sūkhvor-e Rashīd-e Soflá, Sūkhvor Rashīd-e Soflá, and Sūkhūr-e Rashīd-e Soflá) is a village in Heydariyeh Rural District, Govar District, Gilan-e Gharb County, Kermanshah Province, Iran. At the 2006 census, its population was 196, in 42 families.
