= Owlad-e Darbandkabud =

Village in Lorestan province, Iran

Owlad-e Darbandkabud Persian: اولاد دربندکبود
- Village
- Location within Iran
- Coordinates: 33°22′47″N 47°10′17″E
- Country: Iran
- Province: Lorestan
- County: Kuhdasht
- District: Kuhnani
- Rural District: Zirtang

Population (2016)
  - Total: 294
- Time zone: UTC+3:30 (IRST)

Owlad-e Darbandkabud (Persian: اولاد دربندکبود) (Note: Also romanized as Owlād-e Darbandkabūd; also known as Owlād) is a village in Zirtang Rural District (Note: Formerly Rumeshkan-e Gharbi Rural District) of Kuhnani District (Note: Formerly Kunani District) in Kuhdasht County, Lorestan province, Iran.

== Demographics ==
=== Population ===
At the time of the 2006 National Census, the village's population was 254 in 48 households. The following census in 2011 counted 270 people in 70 households. The 2016 census measured the population of the village as 294 people in 84 households.
