= Remen =

Remen may refer to:

- Remen, an Ancient Egyptian unit of length
- Remen (surname)
- Remen Shaonian Top, former weekly Chinese-language version of Weekly Shōnen Jump
- Qaleh Remen, Iranian village

== See also ==
- Ramen, a noodle soup dish
