= Shurabeh-ye Vosta Shahmorad =

Shurabeh-ye Vosta Shahmorad شورابه وسطي شاهمراد
- Village
- Location within Iran
- Coordinates: 33°23′00″N 47°27′00″E
- Country: Iran
- Province: Lorestan
- County: Kuhdasht
- Bakhsh: Kunani
- Rural District: Kunani

Population (2006)
  - Total: 76
- Time zone: UTC+3:30 (IRST)
  - Summer (DST): UTC+4:30 (IRDT)

Shurabeh-ye Vosta Shahmorad (Persian: شورابه وسطي شاهمراد, also Romanized as Shūrābeh-ye Vosţá Shāhmorād; also known as Shūrābeh) is a village in Kunani Rural District, Kunani District, Kuhdasht County, Lorestan Province, Iran. At the 2006 census, its population was 76, in 16 families.
