= Sorkheh Lizheh Karam Ali =

Village in Lorestan province, Iran

Sorkheh Lizheh Karam Ali Persian: سرخه ليژه کرمعلي
- Village
- Location within Iran
- Coordinates: 33°24′19″N 47°10′19″E
- Country: Iran
- Province: Lorestan
- County: Kuhdasht
- District: Kuhnani
- Rural District: Zirtang

Population (2016)
  - Total: 469
- Time zone: UTC+3:30 (IRST)

Sorkheh Lizheh Karam Ali (Persian: سرخه ليژه کرمعلي) (Note: Also romanized as Sorkheh Līzheh Karam ʿAlī; also known as Deh Karim ʿAlī, Deh-e Karam Ali (ده کرمعلي), Sorkheh Lizheh Karim Ali, and Sorkheh Līzheh Karim ʿAlī) is a village in Zirtang Rural District (Note: Formerly Rumeshkan-e Gharbi Rural District) of Kuhnani District (Note: Formerly Kunani District) in Kuhdasht County, Lorestan province, Iran.

== Demographics ==
=== Population ===
At the time of the 2006 National Census, the village's population was 418 in 77 households. The following census in 2011 counted 387 people in 87 households. The 2016 census measured the population of the village as 469 people in 122 households.
