= Chal Siah =

Chal Siah چال سياه
- Village
- Location within Iran
- Coordinates: 33°53′22″N 46°33′36″E
- Country: Iran
- Province: Kermanshah
- County: Gilan-e Gharb
- Bakhsh: Govar
- Rural District: Gowavar

Population (2006)
  - Total: 45
- Time zone: UTC+3:30 (IRST)
  - Summer (DST): UTC+4:30 (IRDT)

Chal Siah (Persian: چال سياه, also Romanized as Chāl Sīāh; also known as Chāleh Sīāh) is a village in Gowavar Rural District, Govar District, Gilan-e Gharb County, Kermanshah Province, Iran. At the 2006 census, its population was 45, in 10 families.
