= Tovah Khoshkeh, Lorestan =

Village in Lorestan province, Iran

Tovah Khoshkeh Persian: توه خشكه
- Village
- Location within Iran
- Coordinates: 33°19′45″N 47°30′37″E
- Country: Iran
- Province: Lorestan
- County: Kuhdasht
- District: Kuhnani
- Rural District: Kuhnani

Population (2016)
  - Total: 827
- Time zone: UTC+3:30 (IRST)

Tovah Khoshkeh (Persian: توه خشكه) (Note: Also known as Tovah Khoshkeh-ye Shekar, Tūvah Khoshkeh, Tūveh Khoshkeh, and Tūy Khoshkeh) is a village in Kuhnani Rural District (Note: Formerly Kunani Rural District) of Kuhnani District (Note: Formerly Kunani District) in Kuhdasht County, Lorestan province, Iran.

== Demographics ==
=== Population ===
At the time of the 2006 National Census, the village's population was 1,153 in 222 households. The following census in 2011 counted 1,011 people in 243 households. The 2016 census measured the population of the village as 827 people in 209 households.
