= Deh-e Baradar =

Village in Lorestan province, Iran

Deh-e Baradar Persian: ده برادر
- Village
- Location within Iran
- Coordinates: 33°23′18″N 47°12′15″E
- Country: Iran
- Province: Lorestan
- County: Kuhdasht
- District: Kuhnani
- Rural District: Zirtang

Population (2016)
  - Total: 310
- Time zone: UTC+3:30 (IRST)

Deh-e Baradar (Persian: ده برادر) (Note: Also romanized as Dah Baradar, Dah Barādar, and Deh-e Barādar) is a village in Zirtang Rural District (Note: Formerly Rumeshkan-e Gharbi Rural District) of Kuhnani District (Note: Formerly Kunani District) in Kuhdasht County, Lorestan province, Iran.

== Demographics ==
=== Population ===
At the time of the 2006 National Census, the village's population was 249 in 54 households. The following census in 2011 counted 291 people in 70 households. The 2016 census measured the population of the village as 310 people in 82 households.
