= Cham-e Latur =

ئەراو ڕودبار ئەراو ڕودبار
- village
- Araw Roudbar ئەراو ڕودبار
- Location within Iran
- Coordinates: 33°27′53″N 46°56′55″E
- Country: Iran
- Ilam: Ilam province
- Sherwan - سیروان: Syrwan county
- Rural District: Syrwan

Population (2006)
  - Total: 172
- Time zone: UTC+3:30 (IRST)
  - Summer (DST): UTC+4:30 (IRDT)

Araw Roudbar (Persian: ئەڕو ڕودبار, also Romanized as Araw Roudbar ) is a village in Syrvan Rural District, Syrvan County, Ilam Province, Iran. At the 2006 census, its population was 172, in 31 families.
