= Usin =

Usin may refer to:

== People ==
- Usin Kerim (1929–1983), Bulgarian Romani poet
- Jaan Usin (1887–1941), Estonian Navy commander
- Rafael Usín Guisado (born 1987), Spanish futsal player

== Other uses ==
- Cheshmeh Sefid-e Usin, village in Iran
