= Baba Gerd Ali =

Village in Lorestan province, Iran

Baba Gerd Ali Persian: باباگردعلي
- Village
- Location within Iran
- Coordinates: 33°26′25″N 47°15′35″E
- Country: Iran
- Province: Lorestan
- County: Kuhdasht
- District: Kuhnani
- Rural District: Kuhnani

Population (2016)
  - Total: 1,265
- Time zone: UTC+3:30 (IRST)

Baba Gerd Ali (Persian: باباگردعلي) (Note: Also romanized as Bābā Gerd ‘Alī; also known as Bābā Kord ‘Alī) is a village in Kuhnani Rural District (Note: Formerly Kunani Rural District) of Kuhnani District (Note: Formerly Kunani District) in Kuhdasht County, Lorestan province, Iran.

== Demographics ==
=== Population ===
At the time of the 2006 National Census, the village's population was 1,394 in 304 households. The following census in 2011 counted 1,380 people in 351 households. The 2016 census measured the population of the village as 1,265 people in 365 households, the most populous in its rural district.
