= Chelehban =

Village in Lorestan province, Iran

Chelehban Persian: چله بان
- Village
- Location within Iran
- Coordinates: 33°24′55″N 47°08′22″E
- Country: Iran
- Province: Lorestan
- County: Kuhdasht
- District: Kuhnani
- Rural District: Zirtang

Population (2016)
  - Total: 532
- Time zone: UTC+3:30 (IRST)

Chelehban (Persian: چله بان) (Note: Also romanized as Chelehbān; also known as Nūr‘alī Chelehbān) is a village in Zirtang Rural District (Note: Formerly Rumeshkan-e Gharbi Rural District) of Kuhnani District (Note: Formerly Kunani District) in Kuhdasht County, Lorestan province, Iran.

== Demographics ==
=== Population ===
At the time of the 2006 National Census, the village's population was 675 in 130 households. The following census in 2011 counted 689 people in 147 households. The 2016 census measured the population of the village as 532 people in 136 households.
