= Sukhur-e Rashid-e Olya =

Sukhvor-e Rashid-e Olya سوخوررشيد عليا
- Village
- Location within Iran
- Coordinates: 34°08′56″N 46°08′21″E
- Country: Iran
- Province: Kermanshah
- County: Gilan-e Gharb
- Bakhsh: Govar
- Rural District: Heydariyeh

Population (2006)
  - Total: 194
- Time zone: UTC+3:30 (IRST)
  - Summer (DST): UTC+4:30 (IRDT)

Sukhvor-e Rashid-e Olya (Persian: سوخوررشيد عليا, also Romanized as Sūkhvor-e Rashīd-e ‘Olyā, Sūkhūr-e Rashīd-e ‘Olyā, and Sūkhvor Rashīd-e ‘Olyā) is a village in Heydariyeh Rural District, Govar District, Gilan-e Gharb County, Kermanshah Province, Iran. At the 2006 census, its population was 194, in 40 families.
