= Tulak =

Tulak (Persian: تولك) may refer to:

- Tulak, Afghanistan
- Tulak, Iran
- Tulak District, in Afghanistan
- Let-Mont Tulak, a Czech microlight aircraft design
