= Katkan =

Village in Lorestan province, Iran

Katkan Persian: كتكن
- Village
- Location within Iran
- Coordinates: 33°26′33″N 47°22′23″E
- Country: Iran
- Province: Lorestan
- County: Kuhdasht
- District: Kuhnani
- Rural District: Kuhnani

Population (2016)
  - Total: 583
- Time zone: UTC+3:30 (IRST)

Katkan (Persian: كتكن) (Note: Also known as Kat Kenār) is a village in Kuhnani Rural District (Note: Formerly Kunani Rural District) of Kuhnani District (Note: Formerly Kunani District) in Kuhdasht County, Lorestan province, Iran.

== Demographics ==
=== Population ===
At the time of the 2006 National Census, the village's population was 638 in 126 households. The following census in 2011 counted 709 people in 170 households. The 2016 census measured the population of the village as 583 people in 153 households.
