= Choqa Sabz-e Naqd-e Ali =

Village in Lorestan province, Iran

Choqa Sabz-e Naqd-e Ali Persian: چقاسبزنقدعلي
- Village
- Location within Iran
- Coordinates: 33°27′19″N 46°58′32″E
- Country: Iran
- Province: Lorestan
- County: Kuhdasht
- District: Kuhnani
- Rural District: Zirtang

Population (2016)
  - Total: 199
- Time zone: UTC+3:30 (IRST)

Choqa Sabz-e Naqd-e Ali (Persian: چقاسبزنقدعلي) (Note: Also romanized as Choqā Sabz-e Naqd-e 'Alī; also known as Chokhā Sabz) is a village in Zirtang Rural District (Note: Formerly Rumeshkan-e Gharbi Rural District) of Kuhnani District (Note: Formerly Kunani District) in Kuhdasht County, Lorestan province, Iran.

== Demographics ==
=== Population ===
At the time of the 2006 National Census, the village's population was 278 in 45 households. The following census in 2011 counted 289 people in 67 households. The 2016 census measured the population of the village as 199 people in 49 households.
