= Shurabeh-ye Karim Khan =

Village in Lorestan province, Iran

Shurabeh-ye Karim Khan Persian: شورابه كريم خان
- Village
- Country: Iran
- Province: Lorestan
- County: Kuhdasht
- District: Kuhnani
- Rural District: Kuhnani

Population (2016)
  - Total: 827
  - Density: 512/km^{2} (1,330/sq mi)
- Time zone: UTC+3:30 (IRST)

Shurabeh-ye Karim Khan (Persian: شورابه كريم خان) (Note: Also romanized as Shūrābeh-ye Karīm Khān) is a village in Kuhnani Rural District (Note: Formerly Kunani Rural District) of Kuhnani District (Note: Formerly Kunani District) in Kuhdasht County, Lorestan province, Iran.

== Demographics ==
=== Population ===
At the time of the 2006 National Census, the village's population was 501 in 108 households. The following census in 2011 counted 544 people in 137 households. The 2016 census measured the population of the village as 512 people in 145 households.
