= Shurabeh-ye Bahram Beyg =

Village in Lorestan province, Iran

Shurabeh-ye Bahram Beyg Persian: شورابه بهرام بيگ
- Village
- Location within Iran
- Coordinates: 33°23′04″N 47°28′21″E
- Country: Iran
- Province: Lorestan
- County: Kuhdasht
- District: Kuhnani
- Rural District: Kuhnani

Population (2016)
  - Total: 840
- Time zone: UTC+3:30 (IRST)

Shurabeh-ye Bahram Beyg (Persian: شورابه بهرام بيگ) (Note: Also romanized as Shūrābeh-ye Bahrām Beyg; formerly known as Bahram Beyg (بهرام بيگ), also romanized as Bahrām Beyg) is a village in Kuhnani Rural District (Note: Formerly Kunani Rural District) of Kuhnani District (Note: Formerly Kunani District) in Kuhdasht County, Lorestan province, Iran.

== Demographics ==
=== Population ===
At the time of the 2006 National Census, the village's population, as Bahram Beyg, was 703 in 139 households. The following census in 2011 counted 794 people in 209 households, by which time the village was listed as Shurabeh-ye Bahram Beyg. The 2016 census measured the population of the village as 840 people in 236 households.
