= Sukhur-e Namdar-e Abdi =

Village in Kermanshah province, Iran

Sukhur-e Namdar-e Abdi Persian: سوخور نامدار عبدي
- Village
- Location within Iran
- Coordinates: 34°11′08″N 46°06′19″E
- Country: Iran
- Province: Kermanshah
- County: Gilan-e Gharb
- District: Gowavar
- Rural District: Heydariyeh

Population (2016)
  - Total: 265
- Time zone: UTC+3:30 (IRST)

Sukhvor-e Namdar-e Abdi (Persian: سوخورنامدارعبدي) (Note: Also romanized as Sūkhvor Nāmdār-e ‘Abdī, Sūkhvor-e Nāmdār ‘Abdī, and Sūkhūr-e Nāmdār-e ‘Ebadī; also known as Sūkhar-e Nāmdār, Sūkhūr-e ‘Abdī, and Sūkhūr-e Nāmdār-e Elāhī) is a village in, and the capital of, Heydariyeh Rural District of Gowavar District, Gilan-e Gharb County, Kermanshah province, Iran.

== Demographics ==
=== Population ===
At the time of the 2006 National Census, the village's population was 315 in 66 households. The following census in 2011 counted 288 people in 69 households. The 2016 census measured the population of the village as 265 people in 80 households.
