= Kuhnani =

City in Lorestan province, Iran

Kuhnani Persian: کوهناني
- City
- Location within Iran
- Coordinates: 33°24′10″N 47°19′15″E
- Country: Iran
- Province: Lorestan
- County: Kuhdasht
- District: Kuhnani
- Established as a city: 1998

Population (2016)
  - Total: 7,768
- Time zone: UTC+3:30 (IRST)

Kuhnani (Persian: کوهناني) (Note: Formerly Kunani (كوناني)) is a city in, and the capital of, Kuhnani District (Note: Formerly Kunani District) in Kuhdasht County, Lorestan province, Iran. It also serves as the administrative center for Kuhnani Rural District. (Note: Formerly Kunani Rural District) The village of Kunani was converted to a city in 1998 and was renamed Kuhnani in 2013.

== Demographics ==
=== Population ===
At the time of the 2006 National Census, the city's population was 3,746 in 734 households. The following census in 2011 counted 8,242 people in 1,937 households. The 2016 census measured the population of the city as 7,768 people in 2,057 households.
