= Remen (surname) =

Remen is a surname. Notable people with the surname include:

- Alfred Remen Mele, American philosopher
- Johan Remen Evensen (born 1985), Norwegian former ski jumper
- Julie Remen Midtgarden (born 1984), Norwegian politician for the Conservative Party
- Rachel Naomi Remen (born 1938) American author, teacher, and alternative medicine practitioner

== See also ==
- Remen (disambiguation)
