= Shurabeh-ye Malek =

Shurabeh-ye Malek شورابه ملك
- Village
- Location within Iran
- Coordinates: 33°52′29″N 46°12′50″E
- Country: Iran
- Province: Ilam
- County: Eyvan
- Bakhsh: Central
- Rural District: Nabovat

Population (2006)
  - Total: 197
- Time zone: UTC+3:30 (IRST)
  - Summer (DST): UTC+4:30 (IRDT)

Shurabeh-ye Malek (Persian: شورابه ملك, also Romanized as Shūrābeh-ye Malek and Shūrābeh Malek; also known as Sūrāvā) is a village in Nabovat Rural District, in the Central District of Eyvan County, Ilam Province, Iran. At the 2006 census, its population was 197, in 39 families. The village is populated by Kurds.
