= Qeytul, Harsin =

Qeytul قيطول
- Village
- Location within Iran
- Coordinates: 34°22′07″N 47°29′38″E
- Country: Iran
- Province: Kermanshah
- County: Harsin
- Bakhsh: Bisotun
- Rural District: Cham Chamal

Population (2006)
  - Total: 172
- Time zone: UTC+3:30 (IRST)
  - Summer (DST): UTC+4:30 (IRDT)

Qeytul (Persian: قيطول, also Romanized as Qeyţūl) is a village in Cham Chamal Rural District, Bisotun District, Harsin County, Kermanshah Province, Iran. At the 2006 census, its population was 172, in 37 families.
