= Shurabeh-ye Pain-e Do =

Village in Lorestan province, Iran

Shurabeh-ye Pain-e Do Persian: شورابه پايين دو
- Village
- Location within Iran
- Coordinates: 33°23′47″N 47°25′02″E
- Country: Iran
- Province: Lorestan
- County: Kuhdasht
- District: Kuhnani
- Rural District: Kuhnani

Population (2016)
  - Total: 174
- Time zone: UTC+3:30 (IRST)

Shurabeh-ye Pain-e Do (Persian: شورابه پايين دو) (Note: Also romanized as Shūrābeh-ye Pā’īn-e Do; formerly known as Shurabeh-ye Sofla Do (شورابه سفلي دُو), also romanized as Shūrābeh-ye Soflá Do; also known as Shūrābeh-ye Soflá and Sūlābeh-ye Pā’īn) is a village in Kuhnani Rural District (Note: Formerly Kunani Rural District) of Kuhnani District (Note: Formerly Kunani District) in Kuhdasht County, Lorestan province, Iran.

== Demographics ==
=== Population ===
At the time of the 2006 National Census, the village's population, as Shurabeh-ye Sofla Do, was 192 in 40 households. The following census in 2011 counted 188 people in 44 households, by which time the village was listed as Shurabeh-ye Pain-e Do. The 2016 census measured the population of the village as 174 people in 48 households.
