= Gilan-e Gharb =

City in Kermanshah province, Iran

Gilan-e Gharb Persian: گیلانغرب
- City
- Location within Iran
- Coordinates: 34°08′26″N 45°55′06″E
- Country: Iran
- Province: Kermanshah
- County: Gilan-e Gharb
- District: Central
- Elevation: 810 m (2,660 ft)

Population (2016)
  - Total: 22,331
- Time zone: UTC+3:30 (IRST)
- Area code: 0834

Gilan-e Gharb (Persian: گیلانغرب) (Note: Also romanized as Gīlān-e Gharb; also known as Gharb and Giyelan (Kurdish: گیەڵان)) is a city in the Central District of Gilan-e Gharb County, Kermanshah province, Iran, serving as capital of both the county and the district.

== Climate ==
Gilan-e Gharb has a Mediterranean climate (Csa), according to the Köppen climate classification.

Climate data for Gilan-e Gharb (normals and extremes for 1998-2021)
Month	Jan	Feb	Mar	Apr	May	Jun	Jul	Aug	Sep	Oct	Nov	Dec	Year
Record high °C (°F)	23.0 (73.4)	24.4 (75.9)	30.4 (86.7)	35.8 (96.4)	40.0 (104.0)	46.0 (114.8)	46.0 (114.8)	47.6 (117.7)	44.3 (111.7)	38.6 (101.5)	34.0 (93.2)	29.4 (84.9)	47.6 (117.7)
Mean daily maximum °C (°F)	13.6 (56.5)	13.8 (56.8)	17.7 (63.9)	21.9 (71.4)	28.8 (83.8)	36.0 (96.8)	39.6 (103.3)	40.4 (104.7)	37.4 (99.3)	31.6 (88.9)	23.1 (73.6)	16.7 (62.1)	26.7 (80.1)
Daily mean °C (°F)	9.2 (48.6)	9.1 (48.4)	12.5 (54.5)	16.0 (60.8)	22.4 (72.3)	28.6 (83.5)	32.1 (89.8)	33.0 (91.4)	30.4 (86.7)	24.9 (76.8)	17.9 (64.2)	11.8 (53.2)	20.7 (69.2)
Mean daily minimum °C (°F)	4.3 (39.7)	4.2 (39.6)	6.7 (44.1)	10.5 (50.9)	15.2 (59.4)	20.7 (69.3)	23.8 (74.8)	25.3 (77.5)	22.2 (72.0)	18.2 (64.8)	12.2 (54.0)	6.6 (43.9)	14.2 (57.5)
Record low °C (°F)	−10.2 (13.6)	−7.2 (19.0)	−3.4 (25.9)	−3.0 (26.6)	4.0 (39.2)	12.0 (53.6)	16.0 (60.8)	18.8 (65.8)	10.0 (50.0)	5.6 (42.1)	0.8 (33.4)	−6.2 (20.8)	−10.2 (13.6)
Average precipitation mm (inches)	57.3 (2.26)	88.8 (3.50)	61.8 (2.43)	71.6 (2.82)	29.6 (1.17)	2.0 (0.08)	2.2 (0.09)	2.1 (0.08)	2.6 (0.10)	4.5 (0.18)	62.2 (2.45)	60.4 (2.38)	445.1 (17.54)
Average rainy days	7.35	9.65	6.9	8.25	5.2	0.35	0.05	0.05	0.25	1.3	5.95	8.4	53.7
Average relative humidity (%)	63.3	60.2	55.5	52.2	43	27.2	23.4	23	23.3	29.1	47.2	56.9	42.0
Mean monthly sunshine hours	175.8	174.3	189.3	220.5	247.8	324.9	349.5	335.9	327.3	267.2	204.6	176.8	2,993.9
Source: Kermanshah Meteorological Office (rainy days 2000-2021, daily mean 2004-2021, sun 2002-2017)

== Demographics ==
=== Ethnicity ===
The city is populated by Kurds from the Kalhor tribe.

=== Population ===
At the time of the 2006 National Census, the city's population was 19,431 in 4,620 households. The following census in 2011 counted 20,922 people in 5,504 households. The 2016 census measured the population of the city as 22,331 people in 6,652 households.

== Infrastructure ==
=== Roads ===
The main access road is the Gilan-e Gharb-Eslamabad-e Gharb route connecting it to Kermanshah. It is also located on the Qasr-e Shirin-Ilam road which has become a shorter route after the paving of the nawdar rural road in 2015. Other routes include the Gilan-e Gharb-Sarpol-e Zahab and Gilan-e Gharb-Sumar roads.
