= Chal Siah Manchatun Jowkar =

Chal Siah Manchatun Jowkar چال سياه من چاتون جوكار
- Village
- Country: Iran
- Province: Kohgiluyeh and Boyer-Ahmad
- County: Boyer-Ahmad
- Bakhsh: Margown
- Rural District: Margown

Population (2006)
  - Total: 46
- Time zone: UTC+3:30 (IRST)
  - Summer (DST): UTC+4:30 (IRDT)

Chal Siah Manchatun Jowkar (Persian: چال سياه من چاتون جوكار, also Romanized as Chāl Sīāh Manchātūn Jowkār) is a village in Margown Rural District, Margown District, Boyer-Ahmad County, Kohgiluyeh and Boyer-Ahmad Province, Iran. At the 2006 census, its population was 46, in 9 families.
