= Shurabeh-ye Marate =

Shurabeh-ye Marate شورابه مراتع
- Village
- Location within Iran
- Coordinates: 33°40′45″N 46°45′47″E
- Country: Iran
- Province: Ilam
- County: Chardavol
- Bakhsh: Zagros
- Rural District: Bijnavand

Population (2006)
  - Total: 272
- Time zone: UTC+3:30 (IRST)
  - Summer (DST): UTC+4:30 (IRDT)

Shurabeh-ye Marate (Persian: شورابه مراتع, also Romanized as Shūrābeh-ye Marāteʿ) is a village in Bijnavand Rural District, in the Zagros District of Chardavol County, Ilam Province, Iran. At the 2006 census, its population was 272, in 46 families. The village is populated by Kurds.
