= Shurabeh-ye Pain-e Yek =

Village in Lorestan province, Iran

Shurabeh-ye Pain-e Yek Persian: شورابه پايين يک
- Village
- Location within Iran
- Coordinates: 33°23′48″N 47°25′00″E
- Country: Iran
- Province: Lorestan
- County: Kuhdasht
- District: Kuhnani
- Rural District: Kuhnani

Population (2016)
  - Total: 577
- Time zone: UTC+3:30 (IRST)

Shurabeh-ye Pain-e Yek (Persian: شورابه پايين يک) (Note: Also romanized as Shūrābeh-ye Pā’īn-e Yek; formerly known as Shurabeh-ye Sofla Yek (شورابه سفلي يِك), also romanized as Shūrābeh-ye Soflá Yek; also known as Shūrābeh-ye Soflá) is a village in Kuhnani Rural District (Note: Formerly Kunani Rural District) of Kuhnani District (Note: Formerly Kunani District) in Kuhdasht County, Lorestan province, Iran.

== Demographics ==
=== Population ===
At the time of the 2006 National Census, the village's population, as Shurabeh-ye Sofla Yek, was 567 in 117 households. The following census in 2011 counted 558 people in 135 households, by which time the village was listed as Shurabeh-ye Pain-e Yek. The 2016 census measured the population of the village as 577 people in 157 households.
