= Chal-e Siyah Gelal =

Chal-e Siyah Gelal چال سياه گلال
- Village
- Location within Iran
- Coordinates: 31°06′01″N 50°42′39″E
- Country: Iran
- Province: Kohgiluyeh and Boyer-Ahmad
- County: Boyer-Ahmad
- Bakhsh: Ludab
- Rural District: Chin

Population (2006)
  - Total: 15
- Time zone: UTC+3:30 (IRST)
  - Summer (DST): UTC+4:30 (IRDT)

Chal-e Siyah Gelal (Persian: چال سياه گلال, also Romanized as Chāl-e Sīyāh Gelāl; also known as Chāl-e Sīyāh) is a village in Chin Rural District, Ludab District, Boyer-Ahmad County, Kohgiluyeh and Boyer-Ahmad Province, Iran. At the 2006 census, its population was 15, in 4 families.
