= Chaqa Sabz =

Chaqa Sabz چقاسبز
- Village
- Location within Iran
- Coordinates: 33°40′06″N 46°45′48″E
- Country: Iran
- Province: Ilam
- County: Chardavol
- Bakhsh: Zagros
- Rural District: Bijnavand

Population (2006)
  - Total: 163
- Time zone: UTC+3:30 (IRST)
  - Summer (DST): UTC+4:30 (IRDT)

Chaqa Sabz (Persian: چقاسبز, also Romanized as Chaqā Sabz and Choqā Sabz) is a village in Bijnavand Rural District, in the Zagros District of Chardavol County, Ilam Province, Iran. At the 2006 census, its population was 163, in 34 families. The village is populated by Kurds.
