= Chaleh Siah, Mazandaran =

Chaleh Siah چاله سياه
- Village
- Location within Iran
- Coordinates: 36°24′31″N 51°55′17″E
- Country: Iran
- Province: Mazandaran
- County: Nur
- Bakhsh: Central
- Rural District: Mian Band

Population (2006)
  - Total: 92
- Time zone: UTC+3:30 (IRST)
  - Summer (DST): UTC+4:30 (IRDT)

Chaleh Siah (Persian: چاله سياه, also Romanized as Chāleh Sīāh; also known as Chāl Sīāh) is a village in Mian Band Rural District, in the Central District of Nur County, Mazandaran Province, Iran. At the 2006 census, its population was 92, in 21 families.
