= Kuhnani Rural District =

Rural district in Lorestan province, Iran

Kuhnani Rural District Persian: دهستان کوهناني
- Rural District
- Location within Iran
- Coordinates: 33°23′N 47°24′E
- Country: Iran
- Province: Lorestan
- County: Kuhdasht
- District: Kuhnani
- Established: 1990
- Capital: Kuhnani

Population (2016)
  - Total: 6,665
- Time zone: UTC+3:30 (IRST)

Kuhnani Rural District (Persian: دهستان کوهناني) (Note: Formerly Kunani Rural District (دهستان کونانی)) is in Kuhnani District (Note: Formerly Kunani District) of Kuhdasht County, Lorestan province, Iran. It is administered from the city of Kuhnani. (Note: Formerly Kunani)

== Demographics ==
=== Population ===
At the time of the 2006 National Census, the rural district's population was 11,596 in 2,364 households. There were 7,160 inhabitants in 1,765 households at the following census of 2011. The 2016 census measured the population of the rural district as 6,665 in 1,827 households. The most populous of its 23 villages was Baba Gerd Ali, with 1,265 people.

=== Other villages in the rural district ===
- Katkan
- Khosrowabad
- Shurabeh-ye Bahram Beyg
- Shurabeh-ye Karim Khan
- Shurabeh-ye Pain-e Do
- Shurabeh-ye Pain-e Yek
- Tovah Khoshkeh
