= Zirtang Rural District =

Rural district in Lorestan province, Iran

Zirtang Rural District Persian: دهستان زيرتنگ
- Rural District
- Location within Iran
- Coordinates: 33°26′N 47°05′E
- Country: Iran
- Province: Lorestan
- County: Kuhdasht
- District: Kuhnani
- Established: 1987
- Capital: Garkhashab

Population (2016)
  - Total: 4,859
- Time zone: UTC+3:30 (IRST)

Zirtang Rural District (Persian: دهستان زيرتنگ) (Note: Formerly Rumeshkan-e Gharbi Rural District (دهستان رومشكان غربي)) is in Kuhnani District (Note: Formerly Kunani District) of Kuhdasht County, Lorestan province, Iran. Its capital is the village of Garkhashab.

== Demographics ==
=== Population ===
At the time of the 2006 National Census, the rural district's population was 6,444 in 1,207 households. There were 6,031 inhabitants in 1,376 households at the following census of 2011. The 2016 census measured the population of the rural district as 4,859 in 1,315 households. The most populous of its 39 villages was Nam Kul, with 638 people.

=== Other villages in the rural district ===
- Chelehban
- Choqa Sabz-e Naqd-e Ali
- Deh Ali Qoli
- Deh-e Baradar
- Owlad-e Darbandkabud
- Sorkheh Lizheh Karam Ali
