= Heydariyeh Rural District =

Rural district in Kermanshah province, Iran

Heydariyeh Rural District Persian: دهستان حيدريه
- Rural District
- Location within Iran
- Coordinates: 34°09′42″N 46°05′50″E
- Country: Iran
- Province: Kermanshah
- County: Gilan-e Gharb
- District: Gowavar
- Capital: Sukhur-e Namdar-e Abdi

Population (2016)
  - Total: 6,619
- Time zone: UTC+3:30 (IRST)

Heydariyeh Rural District (Persian: دهستان حيدريه) is in Gowavar District of Gilan-e Gharb County, Kermanshah province, Iran. Its capital is the village of Sukhur-e Namdar-e Abdi.

== Demographics ==
=== Population ===
At the time of the 2006 National Census, the rural district's population was 7,890 in 1,696 households. There were 7,395 inhabitants in 1,814 households at the following census of 2011. The 2016 census measured the population of the rural district as 6,619 in 1,915 households. The most populous of its 23 villages was Kal Kash, with 1,622 people.
