= Gowavar Rural District =

Rural district in Kermanshah province, Iran

Gowavar Rural District Persian: دهستان گوآور
- Rural District
- Location within Iran
- Coordinates: 33°59′10″N 46°26′14″E
- Country: Iran
- Province: Kermanshah
- County: Gilan-e Gharb
- District: Gowavar
- Capital: Sarmast

Population (2016)
  - Total: 6,801
- Time zone: UTC+3:30 (IRST)

Gowavar Rural District (Persian: دهستان گوآور) is in Gowavar District of Gilan-e Gharb County, Kermanshah province, Iran. It is administered from the city of Sarmast.

== Demographics ==
=== Population ===
At the time of the 2006 National Census, the rural district's population was 8,699 in 1,782 households. There were 7,917 inhabitants in 1,860 households at the following census of 2011. The 2016 census measured the population of the rural district as 6,801 in 1,921 households. The most populous of its 53 villages was Lateh Choqa Sayyadan, with 620 people.
