= Kuhnani District =

District in Lorestan province, Iran

Kuhnani District Persian: بخش کوهناني
- District
- Location within Iran
- Coordinates: 33°23′N 47°13′E
- Country: Iran
- Province: Lorestan
- County: Kuhdasht
- Established: 1995
- Capital: Kuhnani

Population (2016)
  - Total: 19,292
- Time zone: UTC+3:30 (IRST)

Kuhnani District (Persian: بخش کوهناني) (Note: Formerly Kunani District (بخش کونانی)) is in Kuhdasht County, Lorestan province, Iran. Its capital is the city of Kuhnani. (Note: Formerly Kunani)

== Demographics ==
=== Population ===
At the time of the 2006 National Census, the district's population was 21,786 in 4,305 households. The following census in 2011 counted 21,433 people in 5,078 households. The 2016 census measured the population of the district as 19,292 inhabitants in 5,199 households.

=== Administrative divisions ===
Kuhnani District Population
Administrative Divisions	2006	2011	2016
Kuhnani RD (Note: Formerly Kunani Rural District)	11,596	7,160	6,665
Zirtang RD (Note: Formerly Rumeshkan-e Gharbi Rural District)	6,444	6,031	4,859
Kuhnani (city)	3,746	8,242	7,768
Total	21,786	21,433	19,292
RD = Rural District
