= Gowavar District =

District in Kermanshah province, Iran

Gowavar District Persian: بخش گواوەر
- District
- Location within Iran
- Coordinates: 34°02′50″N 46°20′28″E
- Country: Iran
- Province: Kermanshah
- County: Gilan-e Gharb
- Capital: Sarmast

Population (2016)
  - Total: 16,333
- Time zone: UTC+3:30 (IRST)

Gowavar District (Persian: بخش گواوەر) is in Gilan-e Gharb County, Kermanshah province, Iran. Its capital is the city of Sarmast.

== Demographics ==
=== Population ===
At the time of the 2006 National Census, the district's population was 19,023 in 3,993 households. The following census in 2011 counted 18,170 people in 4,376 households. The 2016 census measured the population of the district as 16,333 inhabitants in 4,647 households.

=== Administrative divisions ===
Gowavar District Population
Administrative Divisions	2006	2011	2016
Gowavar RD	8,699	7,917	6,801
Heydariyeh RD	7,890	7,395	6,619
Sarmast (city)	2,434	2,858	2,913
Total	19,023	18,170	16,333
RD = Rural District

== See also ==
- Ghalajeh tunnel
- Eyvan County
