= Gilan-e Gharb County =

County in Kermanshah province, Iran

Gilan-e Gharb County Persian: شهرستان گیلان غرب
- County
- Location of Gilan-e Gharb County in Kermanshah province (left, purple)

- Location of Kermanshah province in Iran
- Coordinates: 34°08′N 46°10′E
- Country: Iran
- Province: Kermanshah
- Capital: Gilan-e Gharb
- Districts: Central, Gowavar

Population (2016)
  - Total: 57,007
- Time zone: UTC+3:30 (IRST)

Gilan-e Gharb County (Persian: شهرستان گیلان غرب) (Note: Also romanized as Gellan (Kurdish: گێڵان and گیەڵان)) is in Kermanshah province, Iran. Its capital is the city of Gilan-e Gharb.

== Demographics ==
=== Language ===
People in Gilan-e Gharb speak Kurdish (Kalhori).

=== Population ===
At the time of the 2006 National Census, the county's population was 60,671 in 13,452 households. The following census in 2011 counted 62,858 people in 15,619 households. The 2016 census measured the population of the county as 57,007 in 16,570 households.

=== Administrative divisions ===
Gilan-e Gharb County's population history and administrative structure over three consecutive censuses are shown in the following table.

Gilan-e Gharb County Population
Administrative Divisions	2006	2011	2016
Central District	41,648	43,424	40,122
Cheleh RD	8,488	9,745	6,361
Direh RD	4,530	4,180	3,600
Howmeh RD	6,684	6,111	5,030
Vizhenan RD	2,515	2,466	2,800
Gilan-e Gharb (city)	19,431	20,922	22,331
Gowavar District	19,023	18,170	16,333
Gowavar RD	8,699	7,917	6,801
Heydariyeh RD	7,890	7,395	6,619
Sarmast (city)	2,434	2,858	2,913
Total	60,671	62,858	57,007
RD = Rural District

== See also ==
- Eslamabad-e Gharb County
- Eyvan County
- Qasr-e Shirin County
- Sarpol-e Zahab County

Media related to Gilan-e Gharb County at Wikimedia Commons
